= Tom Anderson Jr. =

Scottish-American golfer (c. 1885–1915)

Personal information
- Full name: Thomas Anderson Jr.
- Nationality: Scotland; United States
- Born: c. 1885 North Berwick, Scotland
- Died: August 13, 1915 (aged 30) West Orange, New Jersey

Career
- Sport: Golf
- Status: Professional
- Professional wins: 2

Best results in major championships
- PGA Championship: DNP
- U.S. Open: T7: 1909
- The Open Championship: DNP

Thomas Anderson Jr. (c. 1885 – August 13, 1915) was a Scottish-American professional golfer who played in the early 20th century. Anderson's best performance came in the 1909 U.S. Open when he tied for seventh place. He finished tied for eighth in the same tournament the following year and was tied for tenth place in 1912.

Anderson won the Pennsylvania Open Championship twice, in 1912 and 1915. He held positions as professional at Inwood Country Club on Long Island and Oakmont Country Club near Pittsburgh. Immediately prior to his death he had been posted as professional at the Montclair Golf Club, where his father had also worked. Anderson was killed in an automobile crash on August 13, 1915, in West Orange, New Jersey.

== Early life ==
Anderson was born in North Berwick, Scotland, c. 1885. He was the son of professional golfer Tom Anderson Sr. When he was 10 or 11 years old, Anderson emigrated from Scotland to the United States in March 1896—sailing aboard the S.S. Pomeranian from Glasgow—along with his father and his brother Willie, landing at Ellis Island in New York City.

== Golf career ==
=== 1909 U.S. Open ===
The 1909 U.S. Open was the 15th U.S. Open, held June 24–25 at Englewood Golf Club in Englewood, New Jersey, north of downtown New York City (Manhattan). George Sargent established a new tournament scoring record to win his only major title, four strokes ahead of runner-up Tom McNamara. Anderson played excellent golf, finishing in a tie for seventh place. He scored with rounds of 78-74-75-73=300 and took home $35 in prize money.

=== 1910 U.S. Open ===
The 1910 U.S. Open was the 16th U.S. Open, held June 18–20 at Philadelphia Cricket Club in Chestnut Hill, Pennsylvania, a suburb north of Philadelphia. Alex Smith prevailed in an 18-hole playoff over his brother Macdonald Smith and 18-year-old American John McDermott to win his second U.S. Open title. Anderson, who had played well in 1909, did so again in this event when he tied for eighth place by carding rounds of 72-76-81-73=302 and won $30 in prize money.

=== 1912 U.S. Open ===
The 1912 U.S. Open was the 18th U.S. Open, held August 1–2 at the Country Club of Buffalo in Amherst, New York, a suburb east of Buffalo. The course is now Grover Cleveland Golf Course, owned by Erie County. The Country Club of Buffalo relocated several miles east in 1926 to Williamsville. Twenty-year-old John McDermott successfully defended his U.S. Open title, two strokes ahead of runner-up Tom McNamara. Anderson, while playing his normal steady game, was not able to stay with the leaders. He did, however, shoot rounds of 75-76-81-75=307 and still managed to tie for tenth place and won $25 in the process.

== Death and legacy ==
Anderson's promising career as a professional golfer was cut short when he was killed instantly in an automobile crash on August 13, 1915. Driving at night, his high-powered vehicle struck a rut on an unlit portion of Prospect Avenue in West Orange, New Jersey, rolled over, and landed in a 10-foot-deep gully beside the road, pinning Anderson underneath. Two passengers riding with him were injured—one, Thomas Ward, the Montclair Golf Club steward, received lacerations and the other passenger suffered a broken leg—but both survived. He was survived by his mother and three sisters living in Scotland and a fourth sister, Mrs. John Watson, living in the U.S. Anderson died unmarried and without issue, extinguishing the male line of the Anderson family forever.

Anderson is best known for posting three top-10 finishes in the U.S. Open and for winning the Pennsylvania Open Championship twice.

== Family ==
Anderson was the brother of Willie Anderson, a member of the World Golf Hall of Fame. Willie also died young, at age 31, from epilepsy.

== Tournament wins (2) ==
Note: This list may be incomplete.

- 1912 Pennsylvania Open Championship
- 1915 Pennsylvania Open Championship

== Results in major championships ==
Tournament	1909	1910	1911	1912	1913	1914	1915
U.S. Open	T7	T8	?	T10	T36	?	T37

Note: Anderson played only in the U.S. Open.

? = Unknown
"T" = Tied for a place
Yellow background for top-10
