= 1909 U.S. Open (golf) =

Coordinates: 40°52′20″N 73°58′30″W

Tournament information
- Dates: June 24–25, 1909
- Location: Englewood, New Jersey
- Course: Englewood Golf Club
- Organized by: USGA
- Format: Stroke play − 72 holes

Statistics
- Par: 72
- Field: 79, 66 after cut
- Cut: 165 (+21)
- Winner's share: $300

Champion
- (England) George Sargent
- 290 (+2)

Location in the United States
Location in New Jersey
Location near New York City

The 1909 U.S. Open was the fifteenth U.S. Open, held June 24–25 at Englewood Golf Club in Englewood, New Jersey, north of downtown New York City (Manhattan). George Sargent established a new U.S. Open scoring record to win his only major title, four strokes ahead of runner-up Tom McNamara.

In the opening round on Thursday morning, David Hunter made U.S. Open history as the first player to break 70, but he had some problems in the second round when he hit his ball into a brook and subsequently used four niblick shots in getting out. After reaching the turn in 47 he made a nice recovery on the back nine and came home in 37 for 84 (he had another 84 in the third round and finished thirtieth). McNamara also had a sub-70 score with 69 in the second round and led by four strokes midway at 142.

McNamara carried a two-stroke lead over Sargent into the final round on Friday afternoon. Sargent birdied the final hole for 71 and his third consecutive round of 72 or better. McNamara struggled over the final 18 holes with 77 and finished four back of Sargent. Sargent's winning total of 290 broke the U.S. Open scoring record by five shots. Bob Peebles was well positioned after three rounds on 222 but struggled and fell back into the pack with a final round 78.

John McDermott made his U.S. Open debut at age 17 and was 49th. He placed in the top-ten in each of the next five, with consecutive wins in 1911 and 1912, the first American-born champion. Four-time champion Willie Anderson tied for fourth in his penultimate U.S. Open. Horace Rawlins, the inaugural champion fourteen years earlier in 1895, made his last cut in the championship and finished sixtieth.

Due to financial problems, Englewood closed in 1977, making it one of two U.S. Open courses that no longer exist, the others being the original site at Fresh Meadow Country Club which hosted in 1932. The Philadelphia Cricket Club's St. Martins course, which hosted both the 1907 and 1910 editions now plays as a nine-hole course.

== Round summaries ==
=== First round ===
Thursday, June 24, 1909 (morning)

Place	Player	Score	To par
1	David Hunter	68	−4
2	(Scotland) Andrew Campbell	71	−1
T3	(United States) Walter Travis (a)	72	E
T3	F.R. Upton (a)	72	E
T5	(United States) Tom McNamara	73	+1
T5	(England) Gilbert Nicholls	73	+1
T7	John Campbell	74	+2
T7	Charles Rowe	74	+2
T7	(England) Herbert Barker	75	+3
T7	(United States) Jack Burke Sr.	75	+3
T7	(Scotland) Alex Campbell	75	+3
T7	(England) George Sargent	75	+3
T7	(England) Herbert Strong	75	+3

=== Second round ===
Thursday, June 24, 1909 (afternoon)

Place	Player	Score	To par
1	(United States) Tom McNamara	73-69=142	−2
2	(Scotland) Andrew Campbell	71-75=146	+2
3	(England) George Sargent	75-72=147	+3
T4	(Scotland) Alex Campbell	75-73=148	+4
T4	(England) Gilbert Nicholls	73-75=148	+4
T6	(Scotland) Bob Peebles	76-73=149	+5
T6	(Scotland) Alex Smith	76-73=149	+5
8	(United States) Walter Travis (a)	72-78=150	+6
T9	(Scotland) Peter Robertson	79-72=151	+7
T9	Charles Rowe	74-77=151	+7
T9	F.R. Upton (a)	72-79=151	+7

=== Third round ===
Friday, June 25, 1909 (morning)

Place	Player	Score	To par
1	(United States) Tom McNamara	73-69-75=217	+1
2	(England) George Sargent	75-72-72=219	+3
3	(Scotland) Bob Peebles	76-73-73=222	+6
T4	(Scotland) Andrew Campbell	71-75-77=223	+7
T4	(Scotland) Alex Smith	76-73-74=223	+7
6	(Scotland) Jack Hobens	75-78-72=225	+9
7	(Scotland) Isaac Mackie	77-75-74=226	+10
T8	(Scotland) Tom Anderson, Jr.	78-74-75=227	+11
T8	(England) Herbert Barker	75-79-73=227	+11
T8	(United States) Mike Brady	76-77-74=227	+11
T8	(Scotland) George Low	78-75-74=227	+11
T8	(England) Gilbert Nicholls	73-75-79=227	+11
T8	Charles Rowe	74-77-76=227	+11

=== Final round ===
Friday, June 25, 1909 (afternoon)

Place	Player	Score	To par	Money ($)
1	(England) George Sargent	75-72-72-71=290	+2	300
2	(United States) Tom McNamara	73-69-75-77=294	+6	150
3	(Scotland) Alex Smith	76-73-74-72=295	+7	100
T4	(Scotland) Willie Anderson	79-74-76-70=299	+11	70
T4	(Scotland) Jack Hobens	75-78-72-74=299	+11	70
T4	(Scotland) Isaac Mackie	77-75-74-73=299	+11	70
T7	(Scotland) Tom Anderson, Jr.	78-74-75-73=300	+12	35
T7	(England) Herbert Barker	75-79-73-73=300	+12	35
T7	(Scotland) Andrew Campbell	71-75-77-77=300	+12	35
T7	(Scotland) Bob Peebles	76-73-73-78=300	+12	35
T7	(United States) Walter Travis (a)	72-78-77-73=300	+12	0

Amateurs: Travis (+12), Upton (+16), Douglas (+23), Tiffany (+30),
Morgan (+36), Behr (+37), Kirkby (+40), Watson (+40)
