= Andrew Campbell (golfer) =

Scottish golfer

Personal information
- Nationality: Scotland
- Born: c. 1887 Scotland
- Died: Unknown

Career
- Sport: Golf
- Status: Professional

Best results in major championships
- Masters Tournament: DNP
- PGA Championship: DNP
- U.S. Open: T7: 1909
- The Open Championship: DNP

Andrew Campbell (born c. 1887) was a Scottish professional golfer who played in the early 20th century. Campbell had one top-10 finish in a golf major championship when he finished tied for seventh place in the 1909 U.S. Open. He also finished T43 in the 1914 U.S. Open.

== Early life ==
Campbell was born in Scotland, circa 1887. Like some many other golf professionals from Britain during this period in history, he emigrated to the United States to find a better life and pursue his career as a professional golfer. In 1908 he was serving as the head professional at The Springhaven Club in Wallingford, Pennsylvania.

Campbell remained in that position for the rest of his life earning the affectionate title "the father of Springhaven golf." Campbell was one of seven brothers, six of whom became golf professionals, inclusing Alex Campbell and Jack Campbell.

== Golf career ==
=== 1909 U.S. Open ===
The 1909 U.S. Open was the 15th U.S. Open, held June 24–25 at Englewood Golf Club in Englewood, New Jersey, north of downtown New York City (Manhattan). George Sargent established a new tournament scoring record to win his only major title, four strokes ahead of runner-up Tom McNamara.

Campbell came out hot in the first round by posting a 71, the best score in that round by any player. His play in the final three rounds wasn't as stellar, however, and he ended up finishing in a five-way tie for seventh place with rounds of 71-75-77-77=300. Campbell's share of the prize money was $35.

== Death ==
Campbell's date of death is unknown.

== Results in major championships ==
Tournament	1907	1908	1909
U.S. Open	?	T7	?

Note: Campbell played only in the U.S. Open.

"T" indicates a tie for a place
? = unknown
Yellow background for top-10
