= 1910 U.S. Open (golf) =

Coordinates: 40.065°N 75.209°W

Tournament information
- Dates: June 17–20, 1910
- Location: Chestnut Hill, Philadelphia, Pennsylvania
- Course: Philadelphia Cricket Club
- Organized by: USGA
- Format: Stroke play − 72 holes

Statistics
- Par: 73
- Field: 73, 52 after cut
- Cut: 167 (+21)
- Winner's share: $300

Champion
- (Scotland) Alex Smith
- 298 (+6)

Location in the United States
Location in Pennsylvania

The 1910 U.S. Open was the sixteenth U.S. Open, held June 17–20 at Philadelphia Cricket Club in Chestnut Hill, Pennsylvania, a neighborhood of northwest Philadelphia. Alex Smith, the champion four years earlier, prevailed in an 18-hole playoff over his younger brother Macdonald Smith and 18-year-old John McDermott to win his second U.S. Open.

On Friday, Alex Smith opened with a pair of 73's to take the 36-hole lead by two shots ahead of McDermott, Gilbert Nicholls, Fred McLeod, and Tom Anderson.

Smith carded a 79 in the third round on Saturday morning that left him two behind McDermott, who shot a 75 for 223. In the final round that afternoon, McDermott was the first to finish and posted another 75 and a 298 total. Macdonald Smith shot 71 that also placed him at 298. McLeod had a chance to also post 298 after driving the final hole, but his putt for a two stayed out and he finished a shot back. Alex Smith also drove the green at the last needing only a two-putt to win, but he missed from 18 inches (45 cm) and tied with McDermott and his brother. Alex was not fazed by the near-miss; in the Monday playoff, his 71 beat McDermott by four and Macdonald by six.

McDermott won the next two U.S. Opens; he was the first American-born winner and remains the youngest champion (19) through 2016. Four-time champion Willie Anderson played in his final U.S. Open and finished eleventh; he died four months later of epilepsy at age 31.

The course also hosted in 1907 and is the present-day St. Martin's course, now nine holes.

== Round summaries ==
=== First round ===
Friday, June 17, 1910 (morning)

Place	Player	Score	To par
1	(Scotland) Tom Anderson	72	−1
T2	(United States) Tom McNamara	73	E
T2	(England) Gilbert Nicholls	73	E
T2	(Scotland) Alex Smith	73	E
T5	(Scotland) Willie Anderson	74	+1
T5	(United States) John McDermott	74	+1
T5	(Scotland) Macdonald Smith	74	+1
T5	(Scotland) James R. Thomson	74	+1
T9	(England) Herbert Barker	75	+2
T9	(Scotland) George Low	75	+2

=== Second round ===
Friday, June 17, 1910 (afternoon)

Place	Player	Score	To par
1	(Scotland) Alex Smith	73-73=146	E
T2	(Scotland) Tom Anderson	72-76=148	+2
T2	(United States) John McDermott	74-74=148	+2
T2	(Scotland) Fred McLeod	78-70=148	+2
T2	(England) Gilbert Nicholls	73-75=148	+2
T6	(Scotland) Jack Hobens	74-77=151	+5
T6	(United States) Tom McNamara	73-78=151	+5
T8	(Scotland) Willie Anderson	74-78=152	+9
T8	(Scotland) George Low	75-77=152	+9
T8	(Scotland) Macdonald Smith	74-78=152	+9
T8	(Scotland) Chay Thom	80-72=152	+9

=== Third round ===
Saturday, June 18, 1910 (morning)

Place	Player	Score	To par
1	(United States) John McDermott	74-74-75=223	+4
2	(United States) Tom McNamara	73-78-73=224	+5
T3	(Scotland) Jack Hobens	74-77-74=225	+6
T3	(England) Gilbert Nicholls	73-75-77=225	+6
T3	(Scotland) Alex Smith	73-73-79=225	+6
6	(Scotland) Fred McLeod	78-70-78=226	+7
T7	Tom Bonnar	74-78-75=227	+8
T7	(Scotland) Macdonald Smith	74-78-75=227	+8
T9	(Scotland) Willie Anderson	74-78-76=228	+9
T9	(Scotland) Jock Hutchison	77-76-75=228	+9

=== Final round ===
Saturday, June 18, 1910 (afternoon)

Place	Player	Score	To par	Money ($)
T1	(Scotland) Alex Smith	73-73-79-73=298	+6	Playoff
T1	(United States) John McDermott	74-74-75-75=298	+6	Playoff
T1	(Scotland) Macdonald Smith	74-78-75-71=298	+6	Playoff
4	(Scotland) Fred McLeod	78-70-78-73=299	+7	80
T5	(United States) Tom McNamara	73-78-73-76=300	+8	65
T5	(England) Gilbert Nicholls	73-75-77-75=300	+8	65
7	(Scotland) Jack Hobens	74-77-74-76=301	+9	50
T8	(Scotland) Tom Anderson	72-76-81-73=302	+10	30
T8	(England) Herbert Barker	75-78-77-72=302	+10	30
T8	(Scotland) Jock Hutchison	77-76-75-74=302	+10	30

=== Playoff ===
Monday, June 20, 1910

Place	Player	Score	To par	Money ($)
1	(Scotland) Alex Smith	71	−2	300
2	(United States) John McDermott	75	+2	150
3	(Scotland) Macdonald Smith	77	+4	100
