= Isaac Mackie =

Scottish-American golfer (1880–1963)

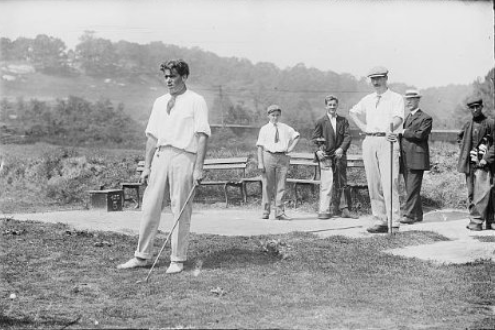
- Mackie (right) in a match against Walter Clark at Fox Hills Golf Club in 1905

Personal information
- Full name: Isaac Sutherland Mackie
- Nationality: Scotland; United States
- Born: 23 September 1880 Earlsferry, Fife, Scotland
- Died: 22 June 1963 (aged 82) Scotch Plains, New Jersey, U.S.
- Height: 5 ft 11 in (1.80 m)
- Spouse: Annie Schacht

Career
- Sport: Golf
- Status: Professional
- Professional wins: 2

Best results in major championships
- Masters Tournament: DNP
- PGA Championship: T17: 1920
- U.S. Open: T4: 1909
- The Open Championship: CUT: 1900

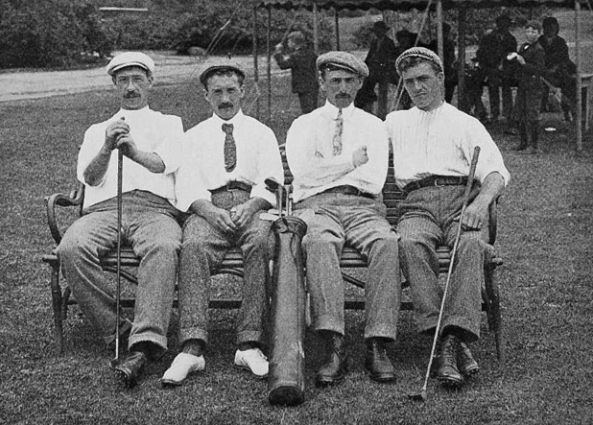
(From left to right): Isaac Mackie, Jack Hobens, Alex Ross, and George Thomson at the 1904 U.S. Open

Isaac S. Mackie (23 September 1880 – 22 June 1963) was a Scottish-American professional golfer who played in the late 19th and early 20th century. He apprenticed as a club maker under George Forrester. Following his brother Jack—who had emigrated to the United States in 1899—Mackie also made the trans-Atlantic journey in 1901. He took a job as professional at Fox Hills Golf Club on Staten Island soon after his arrival and remained in that post until 1914. In 1916, he was appointed the head professional at Canoe Brook Country Club, replacing Louis Tellier. In 1953 he was the head professional at Netherwood Golf Club in North Plainfield, New Jersey.

He was a frequent competitor in the U.S. Open, with at least 12 starts between 1901 and his final appearance in 1921. He won the 1914 Shawnee Open.

== Early life and family ==
Mackie was born on 23 September 1880 in Earlsferry, Fife, Scotland. He emigrated to the United States in 1901, following his brother Jack who had moved to the United States in 1899. He grew to be a tall man of stout build. While in his early 20s he married Annie Schacht, a native-born New Yorker. His brother, Jack Mackie, was one of the early pioneers in American golf being one of the founders of the PGA of America.

== Golf career ==
He accepted a job as professional at the Fox Hills Golf Club on Staten Island soon after his arrival and remained in that post until 1914. He played a match against Walter Clark in 1905, the result of which is unknown. On 13 July 1905 he won an Open Tournament at the Van Cortlandt Park links by shooting 152 on a course that had been soaked with rain. He held off joint second-place finishers Willie Anderson and Bernard Nicholls who finished at 157. It was the first ever professional tournament held on a public links golf course in the United States.

In a $500 four-ball match held on 26 August 1905 at Hollywood Golf Club in Deal, New Jersey, Mackie partnered with Willie Anderson of the Apawamis Club to defeat George Low and Bernard Nicholls. The winners were described as being "at the top of their game" as they played before a large gallery. The play was described by a writer for the New York Tribune as "the finest exhibition of golf that has ever been seen upon the course, and the match was greatly enjoyed".

Mackie was runner-up to George Low Sr. in the 1906 Metropolitan Open and was victorious in the 1914 Shawnee Open which was contested at The Shawnee Inn & Golf Resort in Smithfield Township, Monroe County, Pennsylvania.

=== Canoe Brook Country Club ===
Canoe Brook Country Club's original course was designed by Jack Vickery and his assistant Alex Smith. The first nine holes opened for play in 1902 and the second nine followed in 1905. In 1916, Canoe Brook hired Walter Travis to completely overhaul and extend the original course under the supervision of Mackie who was appointed as head professional to replace former French champion, Louis Tellier, the preceding January. By February 1953 he was the head professional at Netherwood Golf Club in North Plainfield, New Jersey.

=== 1909 U.S. Open ===
In the 1909 U.S. Open, contested at the Englewood Golf Club in New Jersey, Mackie played very well and finished tied for fourth place. He shot rounds of 77-75-74-73=299, tying with Jack Hobens, and won $70. It was his best major championship finish in a long career that included at least 12 starts in the U.S. Open.

=== 1920 PGA Championship ===
Mackie played in the 1920 PGA Championship, which was still a match play event at that time. In the tournament—played from August 17–21 at the Flossmoor Country Club outside Flossmoor, Illinois, a suburb south of Chicago—he lost his match 3 & 2 to George Thompson. Previously, Mackie had won the Eastern PGA Championship on his home course at Fox Hills in 1908, before the national PGA was founded.

== WW I draft registration ==
Mackie registered for the World War I draft on 12 September 1918.

== Death and legacy ==
Mackie died on 22 June 1963 in Scotch Plains, New Jersey. He was a frequent competitor in the U.S. Open in the early 20th century. He had a fine T4 U.S. Open finish in 1909 and was the winner of the 1914 Shawnee Open.

== Results in major championships ==
Tournament	1900	1901	1902	1903	1904	1905	1906	1907	1908	1909	1910	1911	1912	1913	1914	1915	1916	1917	1918	1919	1920	1921
U.S. Open	DNP	16	?	T13	T33	T29	T37	T22	T23	T4	T36	?	?	?	?	T15	?	NT	NT	T13	?	63
The Open Championship	CUT	DNP	DNP	DNP	DNP	DNP	DNP	DNP	DNP	DNP	DNP	DNP	DNP	DNP	DNP	NT	NT	NT	NT	NT	DNP	DNP
PGA Championship	NYF	NYF	NYF	NYF	NYF	NYF	NYF	NYF	NYF	NYF	NYF	NYF	NYF	NYF	NYF	NYF	DNP	NT	NT	DNP	R32	DNP

Note: Mackie never played in the Masters Tournament.

NYF = Tournament not yet founded
NT = No tournament
DNP = Did not play
CUT = missed the half-way cut
R32, R16, QF, SF = Round in which player lost in PGA Championship match play
? = Unknown
"T" indicates a tie for a place
Yellow background for top-10
