= Bob Peebles =

Scottish professional golfer

Personal information
- Full name: Robert Brown Peebles
- Nationality: Scotland
- Born: 23 September 1882 Elie and Earlsferry, Scotland
- Died: 18 March 1959 (aged 76) Greenville, Ohio, U.S.

Career
- Sport: Golf
- Status: Professional

Best results in major championships
- Masters Tournament: DNP
- PGA Championship: DNP
- U.S. Open: T7: 1909
- The Open Championship: DNP

Robert Brown Peebles (23 September 1882 – 18 March 1959) was a Scottish professional golfer who played in the early 20th century. He had one top-ten finish in a golf major championship when he finished tied for seventh place in the 1909 U.S. Open.

== Early life ==
Peebles was born in Elie and Earlsferry, Scotland. He emigrated to the United States in 1900 to further his career as a professional golfer.

== Golf career ==
=== 1909 U.S. Open ===
The 1909 U.S. Open was the 15th U.S. Open, held June 24–25 at Englewood Golf Club in Englewood, New Jersey. George Sargent established a new tournament scoring record to win his only major title, four strokes ahead of runner-up Tom McNamara.

Peebles shot 76-73-73-78=300 in the four-round event. He tied with four other golfers on 300 and took home $35 in prize money.

== Death and legacy ==
Peebles died in the March 1959. Over the course of his long career, he worked at nearly a dozen different golf clubs, including Congressional Country Club and Mexico City Country Club. He was survived by his wife, two daughters, and a son.

== Results in major championships ==
Tournament	1908	1909	1910
U.S. Open	?	T7	?

Note: Peebles played only in the U.S. Open.

"T" indicates a tie for a place
? = unknown
Yellow background for top-10
