= 1912 U.S. Open (golf) =

Tournament information
- Dates: August 1–2, 1912
- Location: Amherst, New York
- Course: Country Club of Buffalo
- Organized by: USGA
- Format: Stroke play − 72 holes

Statistics
- Par: 74
- Length: 6,326 yards (5,784 m)
- Field: 120, 78 after cut
- Cut: 166 (+18)
- Winner's share: $300

Champion
- (United States) John McDermott
- 294 (−2)

Location in the United States
Location in New York

The 1912 U.S. Open was the 18th U.S. Open, held August 1–2 at the Country Club of Buffalo in Amherst, New York, a suburb east of Buffalo. (The course is now Grover Cleveland Golf Course, owned by Erie County. The Country Club of Buffalo relocated several miles east in 1926 to Williamsville (42.972°N 78.727°W).) Twenty-year-old John McDermott successfully defended his U.S. Open title, two strokes ahead of runner-up Tom McNamara.

At the end of the second round on Thursday, Mike Brady, Percy Barrett, and Alex Smith were tied for the lead, with defending champion McDermott two back.

In the third round on Friday morning, played in rainy conditions with thunderstorms threatening to disrupt play, McDermott managed to card a 74 despite hitting two drives out of bounds. He still trailed Brady by three going into the final round in the afternoon, but Brady struggled on his way to a 79 and 299 total. McNamara, seven back at the start of the round, fired a course-record 69 to post 296; his 142 over the last two rounds was a new tournament record, but not enough to catch McDermott. Despite a bogey on the last hole, McDermott carded a 71 for a 294 total, two shots ahead of McNamara.

McDermott, age 20, was already a two-time U.S. Open champion, but by 1914 his golf career was over. After a series of personal setbacks, he began suffering from mental illness and spent most of the rest of his life in a mental institution.

Jim Barnes, a future champion in 1921, tied for 18th in his first U.S. Open. Horace Rawlins, the winner of the inaugural Open in 1895, made his final appearance and missed the cut.

The par-6 tenth hole measured 606 yards (554 m), the longest hole in U.S. Open history up to that point and the only time a hole was given a par more than five.

== Course ==
(present-day Grover Cleveland Golf Course)

Hole	Yards	Par	Hole	Yards	Par
1	345	4	10	606	6
2	315	4	11	400	4
3	406	4	12	340	4
4	380	4	13	210	3
5	455	5	14	170	3
6	300	4	15	516	5
7	125	3	16	155	3
8	430	5	17	540	5
9	300	4	18	333	4
Out	3,056	37	In	3,270	37
Source:			Total	6,326	74

== Round summaries ==
=== First round ===
Thursday, August 1, 1912 (morning)

Place	Player	Score	To par
T1	(United States) Mike Brady	72	−2
T1	(Canada) Dan Kenny	72	−2
T1	(England) George Sargent	72	−2
T4	(Scotland) Frank Peebles	73	−1
T4	(United States) Walter Travis (a)	73	−1
T6	(Scotland) Grange Alves	74	E
T6	(England) Percy Barrett; Canada	74	E
T6	(Scotland) Alex Campbell	74	E
T6	(Scotland) Jack Campbell	74	E
T6	(United States) Jack Croke	74	E
T6	(United States) John McDermott	74	E
T6	(United States) Tom McNamara	74	E
T6	(Scotland) David Ogilvie	74	E

=== Second round ===
Thursday, August 1, 1912 (afternoon)

Place	Player	Score	To par
T1	(England) Percy Barrett; Canada	74-73=147	−1
T1	(United States) Mike Brady	72-75=147	−1
T1	(Scotland) Alex Smith	77-70=147	−1
T4	(Scotland) Jack Campbell	74-75=149	+1
T4	(United States) John McDermott	74-75=149	+1
T4	(Scotland) Frank Peebles	73-76=149	+1
T7	(England) Jim Barnes	77-73=150	+2
T7	(England) George Sargent	72-78=150	+2
T10	(Scotland) Tom Anderson, Jr.	75-76=151	+3
T10	(Scotland) Alex Campbell	74-77=151	+3

=== Third round ===
Friday, August 2, 1912 (morning)

Place	Player	Score	To par
1	(United States) Mike Brady	72-75-73=220	−2
2	(United States) John McDermott	74-75-74=223	+1
3	(Scotland) Alex Smith	77-70-77=224	+2
4	(England) George Sargent	72-78-76=226	+4
5	(United States) Tom McNamara	74-80-73=227	+5
6	(United States) Otto Hackbarth	77-77-75=229	+7
T7	(Canada) Charlie Murray	75-78-77=230	+8
T7	(United States) Walter Travis (a)	73-79-78=230	+8
T9	(Scotland) Alex Campbell	74-77-80=231	+9
T9	(United States) Jack Dowling	76-79-76=231	+9

=== Final round ===
Friday, August 2, 1912 (afternoon)

Place	Player	Score	To par	Money ($)
1	(United States) John McDermott	74-75-74-71=294	−2	300
2	(United States) Tom McNamara	74-80-73-69=296	E	150
T3	(United States) Mike Brady	72-75-73-79=299	+3	90
T3	(Scotland) Alex Smith	77-70-77-75=299	+3	90
5	(Scotland) Alex Campbell	74-77-80-71=302	+6	70
6	(England) George Sargent	72-78-76-77=303	+7	60
T7	(United States) Jack Dowling	76-79-76-74=305	+9	45
T7	(United States) Otto Hackbarth	77-77-75-76=305	+9	45
9	(Canada) Charlie Murray	75-78-77-76=306	+10	40
T10	(Scotland) Tom Anderson, Jr.	75-76-81-75=307	+11	25
T10	(Scotland) Frank Peebles	73-76-83-75=307	+11	25
T10	(United States) Walter Travis (a)	73-79-78-77=307	+11	0

Amateurs: Travis (+11), J. Anderson (+14), Gardner (+23), Lee (+29).
