= Jack Hobens =

Scottish-American golfer (1880–1944)

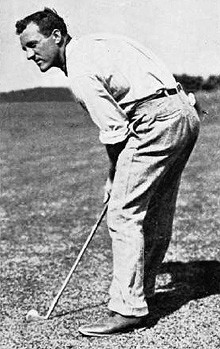
- Hobens prepares to hit a chip shot, c. 1907

Personal information
- Full name: John Owen Hobens
- Nicknames: Jack, Pop
- Nationality: Scotland; United States
- Born: 25 October 1880 Dunbar, Scotland
- Died: 25 March 1944 (aged 63) Englewood, New Jersey, U.S.
- Spouse: Delia A. Lally
- Children: 8

Career
- Sport: Golf
- Status: Professional
- Professional wins: 3

Best results in major championships
- Masters Tournament: DNP
- PGA Championship: T9: 1916
- U.S. Open: 4th/T4: 1907, 1909
- The Open Championship: WD: 1899

John Owen "Jack" Hobens (25 October 1880 – 25 March 1944) was a Scottish-American professional golfer. He was born in Dunbar, Scotland, to Thomas Hoben and Elizabeth (Annie) Owen. He learned the game of golf by starting out as a caddie. Jack had five brothers and a sister.

Both of his parents were alcoholics, so young Jack, being the eldest, was often tasked with caring for his younger siblings. From the age of eleven he was a licensed caddie and was granted his professional ticket at the West Links Golf Club on 13 December 1894 at the age of fourteen.

== Early life ==
Hobens entered the 1899 Open Championship at Royal St George's Golf Club located in Sandwich, England. After shooting a disappointing 90 in the first round he withdrew, but the experience he gained competing against Harry Vardon, James Braid and Willie Park, Jr. would give him confidence to continue his aspirations to be a successful golf professional. Hobens emigrated to the United States in January 1900 and was accompanied on the journey by Tom Anderson, Sr., the former North Berwick head greenkeeper and his son, Thomas Jr., the brother of U.S. Open champion Willie Anderson.

Hobens was appointed pro at Yountakah Country Club in Nutley, New Jersey, and Tom Anderson, Sr. took up a position ten miles away at Montclair Country Club. In April 1901, Hobens moved less than five miles to Glen Ridge Golf Club and George Thomson from North Berwick took over at Yountakah. In 1907 Hobens married an Irish girl, Delia Agnes Lally (1881–1969), and together they would have a house full of children, eight in all. At the time of his marriage he changed his surname from Hoben to Hobens.

Hobens was also the head professional at the Englewood Golf Club (1905–1920), Huntingdon Valley Country Club in Philadelphia (1905–1927) and the Knickerbocker Country Club in Tenafly, New Jersey (1927–1940).

== PGA of America founding member ==
On 17 January 1916, Rodman Wanamaker, a keen amateur golfer and heir to the Wanamaker department store fortune (now Macy's), held a meeting at the Taplow Club, in the Hotel Martinique on the corner of Broadway and West 32nd Street in New York City for the purpose of forming the Professional Golfers' Association of America. The luncheon was attended by several leading amateurs and 35 professionals, including Hobens. The entire group comprised the 'Charter Members'.

Hobens was one of seven chosen to make up the original organizing committee and one of three professionals who wrote the PGA's first constitution and by-laws. The committee met several times at Hotel Martinique in Manhattan before the constitution, fashioned on the British PGA, was approved on 10 April 1916 when their first business was conducted. The first PGA Championship was held in 1916 at the Siwanoy Country Club in Bronxville, New York, and Jim Barnes—after defeating Jock Hutchison in the final match—hoisted the Wanamaker Trophy.

In the winter of 1916, Hobens was employed in the golf department on the top floor of Wanamaker's store in New York. John D. Dunn was head of the 18-member teaching staff, and the list of instructors read like a who's who of golfers from the period and the facility was the largest of its kind in the city.

== Playing career ==
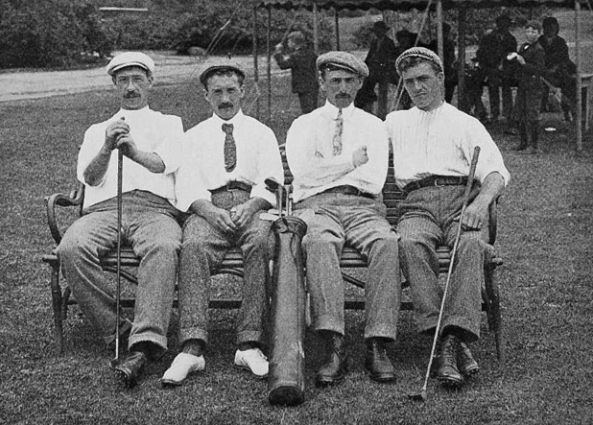
(From left to right): Isaac Mackie, Jack Hobens, Alex Ross, and George Thomson at the 1904 U.S. Open

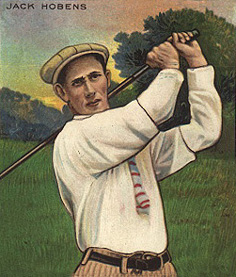
A 1910 artist's rendition of Hobens on a cigarette card

For seventeen years, Hobens—who was sometimes called "Pop"—served as the head professional at Englewood Country Club. He would go on to enter many U.S. Open tournaments during his playing career, often finishing in the top ten. He was described as a long hitter of the ball and generally deadly on the green. He had a wonderful opportunity to win the 1907 U.S. Open at Philadelphia Cricket Club. He was the third round leader but finished poorly with a 12-over-par 85 in the final round. In the second round of the tournament he made the first ever U.S. Open hole-in-one by holing his tee shot at the 147-yard 10th hole.

Hobens was victimized with some horribly bad luck in the 1904 North and South Open at Pinehurst, North Carolina. After 36 holes of regulation play he was tied for first place with Alec Ross. The two players went to a playoff where Hobens was one shot ahead with just a few holes to play. He hooked his tee shot into the left rough on the hole but had an easy, unobstructed shot to the green. Upon making his backswing, his clubhead hooked a weed, or a "creeper" as it was called by Jerome Travers, which caused his ball to move. Hobens, unable to stop his stroke, proceeded to miss the ball completely. The unfortunate result was a one-stroke penalty for causing the ball to move and another stroke for the whiff. He ended up losing the tournament.

Hobens won the 1908 Metropolitan Open at Baltusrol Golf Club in New Jersey by one shot over Alex Campbell and won the first prize of $150. In 1909, the U.S. Open was played at Englewood Golf Club where he was the professional at the time and he played well, finishing tied for fourth place. Hobens finished second in the 1906 Western Open which at that time was considered a ^{†}major tournament.

In the Eastern Professional Golfers Association Four-Ball Tournament held at Rumson Country Club, Rumson, New Jersey, on 9 August 1911, Hobens was paired with Jack Dowling. They won the event easily by posting a round of 68 and beat the second place team of Jack Jolly and Tom Anderson, Jr. who carded a round of 74. The winners received a gold medal and $125 in prize money.

While serving as the head professional at the Knickerbocker Country Club in Tenafly, New Jersey, Hobens provided golf lessons to the famous aviator Charles Lindbergh and his family.

== Later life and family ==
Hobens was afflicted with a physical disability and retired at the age of 60. He and his wife Delia had eight children, five daughters and three sons. At the time of his death, all three sons were serving in the Marine Corps in World War II. All three survived the war.

== Death and legacy ==
Hobens died on 26 March 1944 at his home in Englewood, New Jersey. In 2004, the PGA opened a historical center at PGA Village in Port St. Lucie, Florida, where Hobens was one of the original inductees into the PGA Golf Professional Hall of Fame. His granddaughter, Barbara Hobens, as well as her family, were invited guests at the PGA's 90th anniversary celebrations at the Radisson Hotel Martinique, New York City, in 2006.

Pulitzer Prize winner and Golf Digest contributing editor Dave Anderson of The New York Times, who lives in Tenafly and knew Hobens said, "The tour pros are the show of golf, but the club pros are the soul of golf. Where would we be without club pros? They are the soul of golf forever".

== Tournament wins (3) ==
Note: This list may be incomplete.

- 1908 Metropolitan Open
- 1911 Eastern PGA Four-Ball Tournament
- 1918 Yountakah Country Club Four-Ball Tournament

== Results in major championships ==
Tournament	1899	1900	1901	1902	1903	1904	1905	1906	1907	1908	1909
U.S. Open			T35	T14	T9	T11	T7	10	4	T6	T4
The Open Championship	WD										

Tournament	1910	1911	1912	1913	1914	1915	1916	1917	1918	1919
U.S. Open	7	41	T34	T33	?	T41	?	NT	NT	?
The Open Championship						NT	NT	NT	NT	NT
PGA Championship	NYF	NYF	NYF	NYF	NYF	NYF	R16	NT	NT	R32

Note: Hobens never played in the Masters Tournament.

Did not play
Top 10

NYF = tournament not yet founded
NT = no tournament
WD = withdrew
R32, R16, QF, SF = round in which player lost in PGA Championship match play
"T" indicates a tie for a place

== Notes ==
^{†} Unofficial major
