= Alex Campbell (golfer) =

Scottish golfer and golf course architect (1876–1942)

- Campbell, c. 1937

Personal information
- Full name: Alexander Campbell
- Nicknames: Alec, Nipper
- Nationality: Scotland
- Born: 28 November 1876 Scotland
- Died: 16 December 1942 (aged 66) Dayton, Ohio, U.S.
- Height: 5 ft 5 in (1.65 m)
- Spouse: Nancy Campbell

Career
- Sport: Golf
- Turned professional: c. 1893

Best results in major championships
- Masters Tournament: DNP
- PGA Championship: T9: 1923
- U.S. Open: 3rd: 1907
- The Open Championship: DNP

Alexander Campbell (28 November 1876 – 16 December 1942) was a Scottish professional golfer and golf course architect of the late 19th and early 20th century. In total, Campbell had five top-10 finishes in major championships.

== Early life ==
Alex/Alec "Nipper" Campbell was born in Scotland on 28 November 1876, the son of Alexander Campbell and Margaret Campbell née Patterson. He had five brothers who also became golf professionals.

His brother Jack Campbell was an excellent golfer who emigrated to the USA with Alec.

== Golf career ==
Campbell was the head professional at several golf clubs, including The Country Club (Brookline, Massachusetts, 1896–1916), Baltimore Country Club (Baltimore, Maryland), Northmoor Golf Club (Celina, Ohio), Losantiville Country Club (Cincinnati, Ohio), Miami Valley Golf Club and Moraine Country Club (Dayton, Ohio). He was also a golf course architect, designing the Moraine Country Club.

In 1913, at The Country Club, he played a friendly match against Wilfrid Reid upon the Englishman's arrival in Boston to play in the 1913 U.S. Open. During his 20-year career at The Country Club, he was involved in the development of caddy Francis Ouimet as a player.

=== 1901 U.S. Open ===
Campbell finished in eighth place in the 1901 U.S. Open at Myopia Hunt Club. Willie Anderson won his first of four U.S. Open titles in a playoff over Alex Smith. Campbell had rounds of 84-91-82-82=339—the high second round 91 being detrimental to this overall scoring—however he finished strongly and won $25 as his share of the purse.

=== 1905 U.S. Open ===
In the 1905 U.S. Open held September 21–22, 1905, at Myopia Hunt Club, Willie Anderson won his third consecutive U.S. Open title, and his record 4th overall, by two strokes over Alex Smith. Campbell finished in sixth place, carding rounds of 82-76-80-81=319, and won $70.

=== 1907 U.S. Open ===
Campbell's best finish in the U.S. Open was third in the 1907 U.S. Open, held June 20–21, 1907, at Philadelphia Cricket Club in Chestnut Hill, Pennsylvania. Alex Ross posted four sub-80 rounds to win his first U.S. Open title by two strokes over Gilbert Nicholls. Campbell played consistently good golf, posting rounds of 78-74-78-75=305, and won $100.

=== 1912 U.S. Open ===
The 1912 U.S. Open was the 18th U.S. Open. The golf tournament was held August 1–2, 1912, at the Country Club of Buffalo, which is now Grover Cleveland Golf Course (the Country Club of Buffalo has since relocated to Amherst, New York). 20-year-old John McDermott successfully defended his U.S. Open title with a two-stroke victory over Tom McNamara. Campbell fired rounds of 74-77-80-71=302, finishing 8 strokes behind the winner, and won $70 for his excellent performance.

== Death ==
Campbell died at his home on 16 December 1942 in Dayton, Ohio. He had suffered from a heart ailment for some time. He is interred in the Woodland Cemetery and Arboretum.

His obituary in the Dayton (Ohio) Daily News read; "Alec Campbell was a thin, little man with a pronounced Scottish burr, and eyes that never ceased to twinkle. He was the possessor of a nimble mind and sharp wit, and he could spout poetry by his favorite author, Robert Burns, by the hour and never stumbling over a word."

== Results in major championships ==
Tournament	1899	1900	1901	1902	1903	1904	1905	1906	1907	1908	1909
U.S. Open	12	T11	8	T20	T15	13	6	T18	3	T12	T13

Tournament	1910	1911	1912	1913	1914	1915	1916	1917	1918	1919
U.S. Open	T16	T12	5	13	?	T10	28	NT	NT	?

Tournament	1920	1921	1922	1923	1924	1925	1926	1927	1928	1929	1930	1931	1932	1933
U.S. Open		T55	52		53									CUT
PGA Championship				R16										

Note: Campbell never played in the Masters Tournament or The Open Championship.

Top 10
Did not play

NT = no tournament
CUT = missed the half-way cut
R16, QF, SF = round in which player lost in PGA Championship match play
"T" indicates a tie for a place
? = unknown
