= Metropolitan Open =

Golf tournament

Tournament information
- Established: 1905
- Organized by: Metropolitan Golf Association
- Format: Stroke play
- Prize fund: US$200,000
- Month played: August

Current champion
- Brent Ito

The Metropolitan Open is a golf tournament organized by the Metropolitan Golf Association. In the early 20th century it was one of the top events in the country and was retroactively given PGA Tour-level status.

== History ==
The tournament has been played annually since 1905. It is the third oldest "open" golf tournament in the United States, after the U.S. Open and Western Open. It was staged for the first time in 1905 at Fox Hills Golf Club on Staten Island, which played the dual role of host and sponsor. In 1908, the Metropolitan Golf Association hosted the tournament for the first time. In 1914, Macdonald Smith shot recorded a 278 aggregate, the lowest score ever for a 72 hole tournament.

In the 1920s, according to the Brooklyn Daily Eagle, the event was "weakening" due to alleged neglect from the Metropolitan Golf Association (MGA). In addition, the event was often held in the middle of the summer in the interior of New Jersey or New York. The weather tended to be very hot which discouraged players from attending the tournament and sponsors for supporting the event. In addition, all three local sections in the tri-state regions "didn't want it." However, in 1932 the MGA began scheduling the event immediately before the U.S. Open which was normally held in nearby northeast states. Most of the top golfers therefore played The Met Open as a warm-up for the national championship and the event's "prestige" increased. Some newspapers referred to it as one of the top five events in the world at the time, along with the U.S. Open, British Open, Western Open, and PGA Championship. In 1936, "most of the nation's outstanding stars" played in the event, including Gene Sarazen, Craig Wood, Paul Runyan, and leading amateur Jess Sweetser. A young Byron Nelson won the event, one of his first big wins. In 1939, it was regarded as "richer in tradition than any tournament except the National Open" by The Daily Times. In 1940, there was one of the most notable performances. Craig Wood scored at 264 (−16) total and won the event by 11 strokes over Ben Hogan. In addition, according to The Associated Press his 264 total was considered the second lowest 72-hole total any tournament ever, only behind Percy Alliss' 262 total at the 1935 Italian Open. He also broke the tournament record by 14 strokes, which had stood for 26 years.

In 1941, however, the Metropolitan Golf Association "discontinued" the event citing that it was a "financial burden." At the end of the decade, however, the organization renewed the event and it has evolved one the premier local events in the tri-state area. In 1976, the Met Open became one of the first tournaments to use a 3-hole aggregate playoff, a style now adopted by most of the major championships. The 2009 winner was Andrew Giuliani, the son of former New York City mayor Rudy Giuliani.

== Winners ==
| Year | Winner | Score | To par | Margin of victory | Runner(s)-up | Venue | Ref. |
Met Open Championship
| 2026 | Brent Ito | 201 | −12 | 3 strokes | Matthew Lowe (a) | Essex County | |
| 2025 | David Pastore | 211 | −2 | 1 stroke | Ryan McCormick | Meadow Brook | |
| 2024 | Peter Ballo | 215 | −1 | Playoff (Note: Ballo won a 3-hole playoff with a score of 1-under-par.) | Ethan Ng | Wee Burn | |
| 2023 | Dylan Newman | 209 | −4 | 2 strokes | Mark Costanza (a) | Arcola | |
| 2022 | Ryan Siegler | 209 | −4 | 3 strokes | Michael Graboyes; Max Greyserman; Tom Lovelady; David Pastore | Bethpage Black | |
| 2021 | Andrew Svoboda | 200 | −10 | 2 strokes | Tom Lovelady | Hudson National | |
| 2020 | Luke Sample (a) | 205 | −8 | 3 strokes | Paul Pastore; Ben Polland | Mountain Ridge | |
| 2019 | Matt Dobyns | 200 | −13 | 2 strokes | Michael Graboyes | Piping Rock | |
| 2018 | Andrew Svoboda | 205 | −11 | 1 stroke | Jack Wall (a) | Wykagyl | |
| 2017 | Joshua Rackley | 207 | −6 | 2 strokes | Danny Balin; Matt Dobyns; David Schuster | Hollywood | |
| 2016 | Mark Brown | 206 | −4 | 4 strokes | Cameron Young (a) | Glen Oaks | |
| 2015 | Ben Polland | 210 | E | Playoff (Note: Polland won a 3-hole playoff with a score of 2-over-par.) | Tyler Hall | Winged Foot (East) | |
| 2014 | Grant Sturgeon | 209 | −7 | 3 strokes | Frank Bensel; Timothy Puetz | Trump Bedminster (Old) | |
| 2013 | Mark Brown | 209 | −4 | Playoff (Note: Brown won a 3-hole playoff with a score of 2-under-par.) | Cameron Wilson (a) | Old Westbury | |
| 2012 | Danny Balin | 206 | −9 | 1 stroke | Mike Ballo Jr. Bobby Gage; Morgan Hoffmann; Ryan McCormick (a) | Plainfield | |
| 2011 | Tyler Hall | 206 | −4 | 1 stroke | Bobby Gage | Sleepy Hollow | |
| 2010 | Bob Rittberger | 213 | E | Playoff (Note: Rittberger won a 3-hole playoff with a score of 1-over-par.) | Danny Balin | Bethpage Black | |
| 2009 | Andrew Giuliani | 210 | −3 | 1 stroke | Jerry Courville, Jr. | Ridgewood (N.J.) | |
| 2008 | Mark Mielke | 205 | −5 | 3 strokes | Heath Wassem | Fairfield | |
| 2007 | Frank Bensel | 207 | −6 | 1 stroke | Rick Hartmann; Jim Herman; Bob Rittberger; Andrew Svoboda | Meadow Brook | |
| 2006 | John Guyton | 210 | −6 | Playoff (Note: Guyton won three-hole aggregate playoff. (Scores: Guyton 11, Hartmann 12)) | Rick Hartmann | Canoe Brook | |
| 2005 | John Stoltz (a) | 211 | | Playoff | Craig Thomas | Old Westbury | |
| 2004 | Rick Hartmann | 209 | −1 | 1 stroke | Brian Lamberti | Hudson National | |
| 2003 | Andrew Svoboda (a) | 209 | | 5 strokes | Richard Massey | Metedeconk National | |
| 2002 | Johnson Wagner | 207 | | 5 strokes | Rob Labritz | Winged Foot (West) | |
| 2001 | Johnson Wagner (a) | 206 | −4 | 3 strokes | Rick Hartmann | Bethpage Black | |
| 2000 | Michael Gilmore | 207 | | 1 stroke | Jerry Courville, Jr. (a) | Mountain Ridge | |
| 1999 | Mark Brown | 210 | | 2 strokes | Charlie Bolling; Mat Cannon | Tuxedo | |
| 1998 | Rick Hartmann | 203 | −7 | 1 stroke | Darrell Kestner | The Creek | |
| 1997 | Mike Burke Jr. | 214 | | 3 strokes | Rick Hartmann | Plainfield | |
| 1996 | Bruce Zabriski | 208 | | 12 strokes | Charlie Bolling; Mike Burke Jr. Chris Dachisen; George Zahringer (a) | Stanwich | |
| 1995 | Darrell Kestner | 208 | | Playoff | Bruce Zabriski | Atlantic | |
| 1994 | Charlie Cowell | 208 | −5 | 2 strokes | Rick Hartmann; Bill King | Ridgewood | |
| 1993 | Bruce Zabriski | 204 | | 4 strokes | Larry Rentz | Quaker Ridge | |
| 1992 | Mark Mielke | 207 | | 1 stroke | Rick Vershure | Nassau | |
| 1991 | Mike Dillfey | 205 | | 3 strokes | Jim Albus; Mel Baum | Hollywood | |
| 1990 | Larry Rentz | 204 | | 6 strokes | Mel Baum; Rick Hughes; Tom McGinnis; Bruce Zabriski | Westchester | |
| 1989 | Bobby Heins | 210 | | Playoff | George Zahringer (a) | Bethpage Black | |
| 1988 | Bobby Heins | 210 | | 1 stroke | Tom Joyce | Baltusrol | |
| 1987 | Jim McGovern (a) | 212 | | 1 stroke | David Glenz | Winged Foot | |
| 1986 | David Glenz | 208 | | 1 stroke | Tom Joyce | Nassau | |
| 1985 | George Zahringer (a) | 210 | | 2 strokes | Bruce Douglass | Mountain Ridge | |
| 1984 | Jim Albus | 210 | | 2 strokes | Rick Meskell | Old Oaks | |
| 1983 | Darrell Kestner | 212 | | 4 strokes | Jeff Foxx; Don Reese | Old Westbury | |
| 1982 | Darrell Kestner | 207 | | 4 strokes | Jim Albus | Montclair | |
| 1981 | Kelley Moser | 211 | | 2 strokes | David Glenz | Knollwood | |
| 1980 | George Bullock | 209 | | Playoff | Dick Siderowf (a) | Woodmere | |
| 1979 | Bill Britton | 216 | | Playoff | George Bullock | Plainfield | |
| 1978 | David Glenz | 214 | | Playoff | Nick Manolios | Quaker Ridge | |
| 1977 | Marty Bohen | 214 | −2 | 2 strokes | Austin Straub | Meadow Brook | |
| 1976 | Marty Bohen | 215 | −1 | Playoff (Note: Bohen won three-hole aggregate playoff. (Scores: Bohen 10, Monroe 11, Wright 14)) | Lloyd Monroe; Jimmy Wright | Upper Montclair | |
| 1975 | Carlton White | 211 | | 3 strokes | Carl Lohren | Metropolis | |
| 1974 | Bob Bruno | 209 | | 2 strokes | Dave Smith | Middle Bay | |
| 1973 | Peter Davison | 286 | | 1 stroke | Tom Joyce | Hackensack | |
| 1972 | Don Massengale | 288 | | Playoff | Ron Letellier | Stanwich | |
| 1971 | Ron Letellier | 279 | | 1 stroke | Jimmy Wright | Fresh Meadow | |
| 1970 | Jim Albus | 288 | | Playoff | Jimmy Wright | Ridgewood | |
| 1969 | Jimmy Wright | 284 | | 2 stroke | Mike Fetchick | Fenway | |
| 1968 | Jerry Pittman | 274 | | 8 strokes | Jimmy Wright | Inwood | |
| 1967 | Jerry Courville Sr. (a) | 292 | | 4 strokes | Billy Farrell; Ron Letellier; Stan Mosel; Rick Rhoads; Terry Wilcox | Winged Foot | |
| 1966 | Tom Nieporte | 277 | | 3 strokes | Stan Mosel | Mountain Ridge | |
| 1965 | Jerry Pittman | 275 | | 3 strokes | Wes Ellis; Jimmy Wright | Woodmere | |
| 1964 | Jack Patroni | 284 | | 2 strokes | Wes Ellis; Al Feminelli | Briar Hall | |
| 1963 | Wes Ellis | 283 | | 5 strokes | Doug Ford | Plainfield | |
| 1962 | Miller Barber | 282 | | Playoff | Tom Nieporte | Nassau | |
| 1961 | Wes Ellis | 289 | | 2 strokes | Claude Harmon | Winged Foot | |
| 1960 | Al Mengert | 272 | | 12 strokes | Wes Ellis | Ridgewood | |
| 1959 | Jim Turnesa | 286 | | 1 stroke | Shelley Mayfield | Woodmere | |
| 1958 | Bob Watson | 279 | | 3 strokes | Claude Harmon | Metropolis | |
| 1957 | Wes Ellis | 296 | | 3 strokes | Shelley Mayfield | Plainfield | |
| 1956 | Doug Ford | 288 | | 3 strokes | Mike Turnesa | Inwood | |
| 1955 | Art Doering | 285 | | Playoff | Al Brosch | Fenway | |
| 1954 | Otto Greiner | 290 | | 1 stroke | Jay Hebert | The Knoll | |
| 1953 | Pete Cooper | 284 | | 4 strokes | Pat Cici | Rockville Links | |
| 1952 | Chet Sanok (a) | 289 | | 2 strokes | Dick Mayer; Jim Turnesa | Winged Foot | |
| 1951 | Claude Harmon | 275 | | 2 strokes | Pete Cooper | Forest Hill | |
| 1950 | George Stuhler | 280 | | 1 stroke | Claude Harmon | Garden City CC | |
| 1949 | Jack Burke Jr. | 274 | | 6 strokes | Gene Sarazen | Metropolis | |
| 1941–1948: No tournament due to financial issues | | | | | | | |
| 1940 | Craig Wood | 264 | −16 | 11 strokes | Ben Hogan | Forest Hill | |
| 1939 | Henry Picard | 283 | −1 | Playoff^{1} | Paul Runyan (2nd) Vic Ghezzi (3rd) | Metropolis | |
| 1938 | Jimmy Hines | 287 | | 3 strokes | Sam Snead | Fresh Meadow | |
| 1937 | Jimmy Hines | 279 | | 1 stroke | Henry Picard | Forest Hill | |
| 1936 | Byron Nelson | 283 | | 2 strokes | Craig Wood | Quaker Ridge | |
| 1935 | Henry Picard | 284 | | 4 strokes | Sid Brews | Lakeville | |
| 1934 | Paul Runyan | 287 | | 1 stroke | Wiffy Cox; Walter Hagen | Echo Lake | |
| 1933 | Willie Macfarlane | 291 | | 1 stroke | Paul Runyan | Winged Foot | |
| 1932 | Olin Dutra | 282 | | 2 strokes | Walter Kozak | Lido | |
| 1931 | Macdonald Smith | 285 | | 5 strokes | Gene Sarazen | Crestmont | |
| 1930 | Willie Macfarlane | 280 | | Playoff (Note: Macfarlane beat Farrell 142 to 144 in a 36-hole playoff.) | Johnny Farrell | Fairview | |
| 1929 | Bill Mehlhorn | 288 | | 3 strokes | Wiffy Cox | Lido | |
| 1928 | Tommy Armour | 278 | −10 | 2 strokes | Johnny Farrell | Shackamaxon | |
| 1927 | Johnny Farrell | 296 | | 1 stroke | Bobby Cruickshank | Wykagyl | |
| 1926 | Macdonald Smith | 286 | | Playoff (Note: Smith beat Sarazen 66 to 70 in a third 18-hole playoff. They had tied the first two with scores of 70 and 72.) | Gene Sarazen | Salisbury | |
| 1925 | Gene Sarazen | 295 | | 1 stroke | Joe Turnesa | Grassy Sprain | |
| 1924 | Mike Brady | 292 | | 2 strokes | Willie Macfarlane | Engineers | |
| 1923 | Bob MacDonald | 295 | | Playoff (Note: MacDonald beat Barnes 70 to 79 in an 18-hole playoff.) | Jim Barnes | Canoe Brook | |
| 1922 | Marty O'Loughlin | 309 | | 3 strokes | Johnny Farrell | Lido | |
| 1921 | Bob MacDonald | 294 | | 4 strokes | Pat O'Hara | Siwanoy | |
| 1920 | Walter Hagen | 292 | | Playoff (Note: Hagen beat Barnes 70 to 74 in an 18-hole playoff.) | Jim Barnes | Greenwich | |
| 1919 | Walter Hagen | 294 | | 3 strokes | Emmet French | North Shore | |
1917–1918: No tournament due to World War I
| 1916 | Walter Hagen | 307 | | Playoff (Note: Hagen won an 18-hole playoff, scoring 74, with Barnes scoring 75 and Hoffner 77.) | Jim Barnes; Charles Hoffner | Garden City GC | |
| 1915 | Gilbert Nicholls | 292 | | Playoff (Note: Nicholls beat MacDonald 73 to 78 in an 18-hole playoff.) | Bob MacDonald | Fox Hills | |
| 1914 | Macdonald Smith | 278 | | 9 strokes | Willie Macfarlane | Scarsdale | |
| 1913 | Alex Smith | 291 | | 1 stroke | Tom McNamara | Salisbury Links | |
| 1912 | Tom McNamara | 293 | | 4 strokes | Gilbert Nicholls | Apawamis | |
| 1911 | Gilbert Nicholls | 281 | | 8 strokes | Jack Hobens | Englewood | |
| 1910 | Alex Smith | 301 | | 2 strokes | John McDermott | Deal | |
| 1909 | Alex Smith | 306 | | 2 strokes | Gilbert Nicholls | Wykagyl | |
| 1908 | Jack Hobens | 305 | | 1 stroke | Alex Campbell | Baltusrol | |
1907: No tournament
| 1906 | George Low | 294 | | 2 strokes | Alex Smith | Hollywood | |
| 1905 | Alex Smith | 300 | | Playoff (Note: Smith beat Anderson 74 to 76 in an 18-hole playoff.) | Willie Anderson | Fox Hills | |

^{1}Picard and Runyan tied with a 70 at the end of the first 18-hole playoff while Ghezzi was eliminated with a 77. In the second playoff, Picard defeated Runyan 69 to 71.
