= Canoe Brook Country Club =

Country club in New Jersey, US

Club information
- Location: Summit, New Jersey, U.S. Short Hills, New Jersey, U.S.
- Established: 1901
- Type: Private
- Tota holes: 36
- Website: www.canoebrook.org

North Course
- Designed by: Rees Jones
- Par: 72
- Length: 7,163 yards (6,550 m)
- Course rating: 74.3 (Blue Tees); 72.3 (White Tees); 70.8 (Gold Tees); 73.8 (Red Tees)
- Slope rating: 136 (Blue Tees); 132 (White Tees); 131 (Gold Tees); 134 (Red Tees)
- Course record: 66

South Course
- Designed by: Rees Jones
- Par: 72
- Length: 6,707 yards (6,133 m)
- Course rating: 72.7 (Blue Tees); 71.3 (White Tees); 69.3 (Gold Tees); 73.2 (Red Tees)
- Slope rating: 131 (Blue Tees); 128 (White Tees); 122 (Gold Tees); 128 (Red Tees)

Canoe Brook Country Club is a private, member-owned 36-hole country club founded in 1901 and located in the New Jersey towns of Summit and Short Hills. Both of Canoe Brook's courses have been extensively renovated by Rees Jones, whom the club credits as its designer.

== History ==
Canoe Brook's original course was designed by Jack Vickery and his assistant Alex Smith. The first nine holes opened for play in 1902; the second nine in 1905. In 1916, Canoe Brook hired Walter Travis to overhaul and extend the original course under the supervision of Isaac Mackie, whom the club had the previous January appointed Head Professional to replace former French champion Louis Tellier. The Travis design lengthened what would become known as Canoe Brook's North Course to 6,611 yards from the Championship tees. In 1920, Harry Colt, Charles Hugh Alison, and Alister MacKenzie were hired to design an additional 18-hole course south of Morris Turnpike. This property became the Canoe Brook South Course.

In the early 1950s, the North Course was extensively redesigned by Robert Trent Jones after the club accepted an offer by Prudential Insurance to "swap" land to make room for a shopping center that is now known as The Mall at Short Hills. In the 1960s, Rees Jones redesigned both courses as required by the construction and expansion of New Jersey Route 24. He made other changes from 1990 to 2010.

== Tournaments ==
Canoe Brook has hosted USGA and MGA events. It has been a U.S. Open Sectional Qualifying site on several occasions, including in 2016 to 2018, and hosted the 2013 New Jersey State Amateur in June. The club hosted the 2015 Metropolitan Golf Association Ike Championship.
