= France–United States Professional Match =

Tournament information
- Location: Versailles, France
- Established: 1911
- Course: Racing Club de France La Boulie
- Format: Team match play
- Month played: June/July

Final champion
- France

Location in France

The France–United States Professional Match was a men's team golf competition between teams of four professional golfers from France and the United States. It was played at Racing Club de France La Boulie on Monday 30 June and Tuesday 1 July 1913, just before the French Amateur Championship which was played there later in the week. The match resulted in a convincing 6–0 victory for the French team.

== Background ==
The original idea was to have four teams playing, including England and Scotland, but this idea was quickly replaced with a match between France and the United States.

The Americans were amongst those who had played in the 1913 Open Championship at Royal Liverpool Golf Club, Hoylake earlier in June. Of the American team, McDermott and McNamara had qualified for the Open Championship itself but Brady and Campbell had not. McDermott finished tied for 5th place.

== Format ==
The match was contested over two days. There were two 36-hole foursomes matches on the first day with four 36-hole single matches on the final day.

== Monday's foursomes matches ==
	Results
Arnaud Massy/Louis Tellier	3 & 2	John McDermott/Tom McNamara
Jean Gassiat/Pierre Lafitte	3 & 2	Mike Brady/Alex Smith
2	Session	0
2	Overall	0

== Tuesday's singles matches ==
	Results
Arnaud Massy	2 & 1	Tom McNamara
Louis Tellier	6 & 4	Alex Smith
Jean Gassiat	5 & 3	Mike Brady
Pierre Lafitte	3 & 2	John McDermott
4	Session	0
6	Overall	0
