= Pennsylvania Open Championship =

Golf tournament

The Pennsylvania Open Championship is the Pennsylvania state open golf tournament, open to both amateur and professional golfers. It is organized by the Pennsylvania Golf Association. It has been played annually since 1912 (except for war years) at a variety of courses around the state. It was considered a PGA Tour event in some years during the 1920s and 1930s.

== Winners ==
- 2026 Zac Oakley
- 2025 Patrick Sheehan
- 2024 Jake Sollon
- 2023 Kevin Kraft
- 2022 Jake Sollon
- 2021 Alex Blickle
- 2020 Jimmy Ellis (a)
- 2019 Isaiah Logue
- 2018 Kevin Kraft
- 2017 Greg Jarmas
- 2016 Robert Rohanna
- 2015 Billy Stewart
- 2014 John Pillar, Sr.
- 2013 Andrew Mason
- 2012 Clayton Rotz
- 2011 Mark Sheftic
- 2010 Robert Rohanna
- 2009 Justin Smith
- 2008 Mike Van Sickle (a)
- 2007 Mike Van Sickle (a)
- 2006 Kyle Davis
- 2005 Sean Farren
- 2004 Ryan Sikora
- 2003 Steve Wheatcroft
- 2002 Terry Hertzog
- 2001 Jeff Daniels
- 2000 Terry Hertzog
- 1999 Terry Hatch
- 1998 Stuart Ingraham
- 1997 Gene Fieger
- 1996 John Mazza
- 1995 Gene Fieger
- 1994 Paul Oglesby
- 1993 Bob Ford
- 1992 Mike Moses
- 1991 Frank Dobbs
- 1990 Jay Sigel (a)
- 1989 Joseph J. Boros
- 1988 Gene Fieger
- 1987 Brian Kelly
- 1986 Frank Fuhrer, III
- 1985 Don De Angelis
- 1984 Roy Vucinich
- 1983 Jay Sigel (a)
- 1982 Lee Raymond (a)
- 1981 Bob Ford
- 1980 Bob Huber
- 1979 Ron Milanovich
- 1978 Jay Sigel (a)
- 1977 Bob Ford
- 1976 Jeff Steinberg
- 1975 Steve Brewton (a)
- 1974 Jay Sigel (a)
- 1973 Tony Perla
- 1972 Andy Thompson
- 1971 Jack Kiefer
- 1970 James Masserio (a)
- 1969 Tony Perla
- 1968 Ronald Stafford
- 1967 Robert Ross
- 1966 Richard Bassett
- 1965 Bob Shave
- 1964 Jerry Pisano
- 1963 Bert Yancey
- 1962 Henry Williams, Jr.
- 1961 Al Besselink
- 1960 John Guenther, Jr. (a)
- 1959 Skee Riegel
- 1958 Dick Sleichter
- 1957 Skee Riegel
- 1956 Johnny Weitzel
- 1955 Johnny Weitzel
- 1954 Henry Williams, Jr.
- 1953 Bo Wininger
- 1952 George Griffin, Jr.
- 1951 Johnny Bulla
- 1950 Jerry Barber
- 1949 Andy Gasper
- 1948 Terl Johnson
- 1947 Steve Kovach
- 1946 Steve Kovach
- 1943–1945 No tournament
- 1942 Sam Byrd
- 1941 Gene Kunes
- 1940 Sam Parks, Jr.
- 1939 Ray Mangrum
- 1938 Lloyd Mangrum
- 1937 Toney Penna
- 1936 Felix Serafin
- 1935 Ray Mangrum
- 1934 Willie Macfarlane
- 1933 Dick Metz
- 1932 Vincent Eldred
- 1931 Felix Serafin
- 1930 Ed Dudley
- 1929 Ed Dudley
- 1928 Tommy Armour
- 1927 Johnny Farrell
- 1926 John Rogers
- 1925 Joe Turnesa
- 1924 Emmet French
- 1923 James Edmundson
- 1922 Emil Loeffler
- 1921 Cyril Walker
- 1920 Emil Loeffler
- 1919 Charles Hoffner
- 1917–1918 No tournament
- 1916 Jock Hutchison
- 1915 Tom Anderson, Jr.
- 1914 Macdonald Smith
- 1913 James Thompson
- 1912 Tom Anderson, Jr.

(a) denotes amateur
