= Macdonald Smith =

Scottish-American professional golfer (1892–1949)

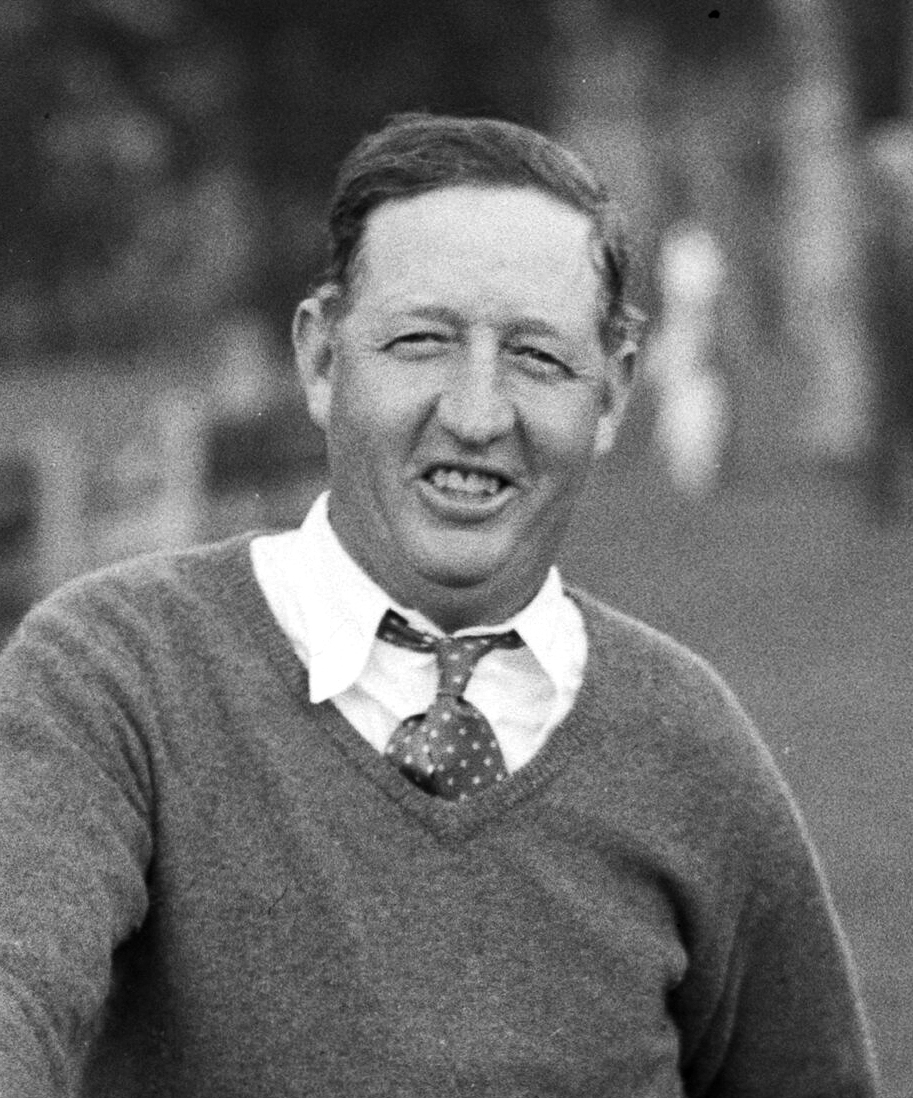
- Smith in 1928

Personal information
- Full name: Macdonald S. Smith
- Nickname: Mac
- Nationality: Scotland; United States
- Born: March 18, 1890 Carnoustie, Angus, Scotland
- Died: August 31, 1949 (aged 59) Glendale, California
- Height: 5 ft 9 in (1.75 m)
- Spouse: Louise A. Cahill

Career
- Sport: Golf
- Turned professional: 1908
- Former tour: PGA Tour
- Professional wins: 29

Number of wins by tour
- PGA Tour: 25
- Other: 4

Best results in major championships
- Masters Tournament: T7: 1934
- PGA Championship: DNP
- U.S. Open: 2nd: 1930
- The Open Championship: 2nd/T2: 1930, 1932

Achievements and awards
- PGA Hall of Fame: 1954

Macdonald "Mac" Smith (March 18, 1890 – August 31, 1949) was one of the top professional golfers in the world from about 1910 into the mid-1930s. He was a member of a famous Scottish golfing family. Smith is regarded, based on his results, as one of the best golfers of all time who never won a major championship. He won 25 official events on the PGA Tour, and placed in the top ten of major championships a total of 17 times.

== Early life ==
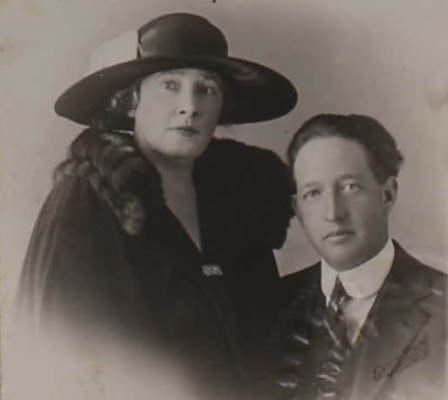
Smith and his wife Louise in February 1923

Born in Carnoustie, Scotland, the son of John D. Smith and Joann Smith (née Robinson), Smith learned his golf on the world famous and very difficult Carnoustie Golf Links.

He emigrated to the United States on March 8, 1908, at age 17 to seek better golfing opportunities, which he eventually found in America. He applied for, and was granted, American citizenship on July 31, 1918, from the Superior Court of San Diego County, California. At the time, Smith was serving in the U.S. Army at Camp Kearny in San Diego during World War I.

== Professional career ==
Smith was the club professional at the country club in Del Monte, California, where future two-time major champion Olin Dutra and his brother Mortie started as caddies.

Two of Smith's older brothers won the U.S. Open: Willie in 1899, and Alex in both 1906 and 1910. Brothers George and Jim also played golf at a very high standard. Early in his career, Macdonald Smith was in a three-man playoff at the U.S. Open in 1910 won by his brother Alex; John McDermott finished second and Macdonald Smith finished third.

Smith won 25 times on the early PGA Tour, with his five wins in 1926 marking his peak season. But he never won a modern major championship, trailing only Harry Cooper for most wins without a modern major. His 25 Tour wins are also the most by any eligible player not inducted into the World Golf Hall of Fame.

=== Play in major championships ===
Smith finished in the top ten at modern majors 17 times, including three second-place finishes: at the U.S. Open in 1930 and The Open Championship in 1930 and 1932, both in England. His runner-up finishes at both Opens in 1930 were to noted amateur Bobby Jones, the winner of the grand slam that year. Gene Sarazen won the 1932 Open Championship. Smith scored four more wins in significant U.S. tournaments, between 1912 and 1926, all of which came in events later classified as PGA Tour events.

Smith suffered a heartbreaking near-miss at Prestwick Golf Club in Scotland in the 1925 Open Championship, when he was the 54-hole leader. He shot a disappointing 82 in the final round and finished three strokes back, in fourth place; Jim Barnes won. Crowd control broke down (with too few marshals and no gallery roping), with the numerous spectators, many of whom had traveled to watch him, invading the playing areas, causing delays, chaotic conditions, and deflected shots. Many of them had entered without paying admission—the so-called 'Aberdeen Gate' -- simply climbing over the seaside dunes to walk onto the course.

Smith related to the teacher and author Harvey Penick an unfortunate story about another near-miss in an Open Championship. Smith was leading at lunch on the final day, with 18 holes to play. But, in the final round, his tee shots kept winding up in poor lies or on trampled ground. Smith believed that bookies who had taken bets on him at 5–1 odds were running ahead and tampering with his ball location, making it tougher for him to hit good shots.

His majors were primarily the two Opens; he never entered the PGA Championship, then a match play competition, and played in just one Masters Tournament, the first in 1934. His final major was the U.S. Open in 1937, where he finished in a tie for 40th place. The previous year was his last top ten, in fourth place.

=== Western Open; North and South Open; Los Angeles Open; Canadian Open ===
Smith won the Western Open three times, in 1912, 1925, and 1933, when it was a prestigious tournament rivaling the majors in stature. He won the 1925 North and South Open, which during this era was considered a major by many. His four wins in the Los Angeles Open, another top event which featured strong fields, were also significant, as was his title in the 1926 Canadian Open, a national championship. Smith had a near decade-long dry spell, between 1915 and 1923, without winning a tournament.

Smith's full-swing technique was much admired as one of the best of the hickory shaft era. Bing Crosby, himself an excellent player who followed golf closely, said that Smith's swing was better than any he had ever seen. Ben Hogan studied Smith's swing intently to improve his own. Smith employed a strong grip, with both hands turned more to the right on the club, which produced a draw on the majority of his full shots. Another admirer of Smith's full-swing technique was teacher Harvey Penick. Penick wrote "The prettiest swing I ever saw belonged to Macdonald Smith. His swing was full and flowing and graceful." Smith also won several Tour events after the introduction of steel shafts for golf clubs in the late 1920s.

Smith became the resident golf professional at Oakmont Country Club in Glendale, California, from 1934 to 1949. He won a PGA Tour event, the Oakmont Open, there in 1935. He continued to play a few PGA Tour events per season into the early 1940s. He was playing with Babe Didrikson at Oakmont when she scored her first hole in one in 1936.

== Personal life ==
In December 1922, he was married to Louise A. Cahill (1876–1952), a woman 14 years his senior who had been widowed in 1907 when her first husband, Joseph Harvey, died.

Smith died of a heart attack on August 31, 1949, in Glendale, California.

== Awards and honors ==
- Smith was inducted into the PGA Hall of Fame in 1954.

== Professional wins ==
=== PGA Tour wins (25) ===
- 1912 (1) Western Open
- 1924 (2) California Open, Northern California Open
- 1925 (4) California Open, North and South Open, Western Open, Long Island Open
- 1926 (5) Texas Open, Dallas Open, Canadian Open, Metropolitan Open, Chicago Open Championship
- 1928 (3) Los Angeles Open, Palos Verdes Golf Club Open, South Central Open
- 1929 (2) Los Angeles Open, Long Island Open
- 1930 (1) Long Island Open
- 1931 (2) Metropolitan Open, Long Island Open
- 1932 (1) Los Angeles Open
- 1933 (1) Western Open
- 1934 (1) Los Angeles Open
- 1935 (1) Oakmont Open
- 1936 (1) Seattle Open

=== Other wins (4) ===
[This list may be incomplete]

- 1914 Pennsylvania Open Championship, Metropolitan Open
- 1924 Miami International Four-Ball (with Bill Mehlhorn)
- 1926 Miami International Four-Ball (with Bill Mehlhorn)

== Results in major championships ==
Tournament	1910	1911	1912	1913	1914	1915	1916	1917	1918	1919
U.S. Open	3			T4	WD	T37		NT	NT	
The Open Championship						NT	NT	NT	NT	NT

Tournament	1920	1921	1922	1923	1924	1925	1926	1927	1928	1929
U.S. Open				T20	T4	T11	T9	T18	T6	T23
The Open Championship				3	T3	4				T15

Tournament	1930	1931	1932	1933	1934	1935	1936	1937
Masters Tournament	NYF	NYF	NYF	NYF	T7			
U.S. Open	2	T10	T14	T19	T6	T14	4	T40
The Open Championship	T2	T5	2		T4	T18		

Note: Smith never played in the PGA Championship.

Top 10
Did not play

NYF = tournament not yet founded
NT = no tournament
WD = withdrew
"T" indicates a tie for a place

=== Summary ===
Tournament	Wins	2nd	3rd	Top-5	Top-10	Top-25	Events	Cuts made
Masters Tournament	0	0	0	0	1	1	1	1
U.S. Open	0	1	1	5	9	16	19	18
The Open Championship	0	2	2	7	7	9	9	9
PGA Championship	0	0	0	0	0	0	0	0
Totals	0	3	3	12	17	26	29	28

- Most consecutive cuts made – 26 (1915 U.S. Open – 1937 U.S. Open)
- Longest streak of top-10s – 4 (1930 U.S. Open – 1931 Open Championship)

== See also ==
- List of golfers with most PGA Tour wins
