= John McDermott (golfer) =

American professional golfer (1891–1971)

John McDermott, Jr.
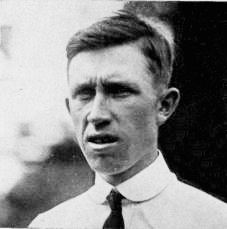

Personal information
- Full name: John J. McDermott, Jr.
- Nationality: United States
- Born: August 12, 1891 Philadelphia, Pennsylvania, U.S.
- Died: August 1, 1971 (aged 79) Philadelphia, Pennsylvania, U.S.

Career
- Sport: Golf
- Turned professional: 1908
- Professional wins: 7

Best results in major championships (wins: 2)
- U.S. Open: Won: 1911, 1912
- The Open Championship: T5: 1913

John J. McDermott Jr. (August 12, 1891 – August 1, 1971) was an American professional golfer. He was the first U.S.-born golfer to win the U.S. Open, triumphing at the 1911 U.S. Open and the 1912 U.S. Open. McDermott remains the youngest player to win the event, at age 19, as well as the second youngest to win any of golf's four major tournaments after Young Tom Morris. He was the first player to break par over 72 holes in a significant event, which he did at the 1912 U.S. Open. He was one of the world's top players between 1910 and 1914.

== Early life ==
McDermott was born in Philadelphia, Pennsylvania, the son of a mailman. He was a good student at West Philadelphia High School, but dropped out before graduation. He worked as a caddie at the Aronimink Golf Club, and learned golf from its longtime head professional Walter Reynolds.

== Professional career ==
After he dropped out of high school, he turned pro. McDermott's first professional job was at the Merchantville Field Club (now the Merchantville Country Club) in Cherry Hill, New Jersey. He moved to the Atlantic City Country Club, where his practice regimen became legendary. As a teenager, he made his debut at the 1909 U.S. Open, scoring 322 for 49th place.

"He had a long, loose, flowing swing," according to golf historian Robert Sommers, "somewhat like the old St. Andrew’s swing of the feather-ball period, but with more body turn".

The first sixteen Opens had all been won by British golfers who had learned the game in England or Scotland, and visited the United States to play in tournaments, or in most cases, lived in the U.S. and worked as club professionals. By 1910, the U.S. was starting to produce its own professionals in quantity.

McDermott improved his game dramatically in one year, and lost out in an 18-hole playoff to Alex Smith in the 1910 U.S. Open, held at the Philadelphia Cricket Club (St. Martin's course); Macdonald Smith, the younger brother of Alex, was also in the playoff. The three players had tied at 298 over 72 holes. Early in 1911, McDermott challenged Philadelphia-area professionals to matches at $1,000 each, after he won three straight, the competition vanished.

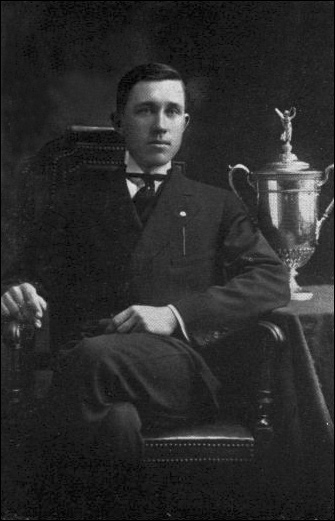
Defending champion McDermott with the U.S. Open trophy in 1913

Later that year, he won the U.S. Open by three shots at the Chicago Golf Club, following another three-way playoff, where he won over George Simpson and Mike Brady; the three players had tied at 307 for 72 holes. McDermott remains the youngest U.S. Open Champion of all time at 19 years, 10 months and 14 days, and he was the first American-born champion. In 1912, he retained his title at the Country Club of Buffalo in New York State. He shot 294 for four rounds on a par 74 course, a score of two under par, making him the first man to break par for 72 holes in a high-standard event. Following his second straight national championship, McDermott's finances flourished, with golf clubs bearing his name, endorsements for golf balls, and demand for his high-standard golf, including lucrative exhibition matches. McDermott made his first attempt at the British Open in 1912, but failed to qualify for the championship proper. But he returned to Britain the next year, and tied for fifth place in the Open at the Royal Liverpool Golf Club. This was the best finish by an American player to that stage.

In 1913, McDermott won the Western Open, then the second most prestigious professional tournament in the United States. He also won the Philadelphia Open Championship three times: 1910, 1911, and 1913.

Also in 1913, McDermott won the Open tournament at Shawnee-on-Delaware, Pennsylvania, finishing ahead of top Englishmen Harry Vardon and Ted Ray.

After the 1912 Open Championship, McDermott lost heavily on investments. Then, following his 1913 win at Shawnee over Harry Vardon and Ted Ray, he boasted excessively, was criticized by his fellow players and the crowd for this, and had to apologize; it seems there were no lasting hard feelings. As the defending champion, he finished four strokes behind the leaders at the 1913 U.S. Open at The Country Club in Boston, in a tie for 8th place. He tied for 9th place in the 1914 U.S. Open, as Walter Hagen won at the Midlothian Club near Chicago.

== Illness, death, and legacy ==
In 1914, McDermott visited the United Kingdom again to compete in the British Open, but because of travel difficulties, he arrived too late to play. On his way home, his ship, the SS Kaiser Wilhelm II, collided with another vessel, the British-flagged grain carrier Incemore, in foggy, misty conditions in the English Channel. The ship returned to port and the passengers were transferred to the SS Imperator the next day. This dangerous incident apparently had a serious effect upon him. Shortly afterward, upon his return home, he blacked out when entering the clubhouse at the Atlantic City Country Club, where he was the club professional. He was only 23 years old. He spent the rest of his life in mental hospitals and rest homes, or living with his family in Philadelphia, suffering from mental illness. He competed sporadically in regional golf events into the 1920s, but without notable success. He occasionally spectated at important golf events near his home, and watched the 1971 U.S. Open at Merion Golf Club, some six weeks before his death.

Although McDermott was the first American U.S. Open champion, it is Francis Ouimet's 1913 U.S. Open victory that is most often cited as the key event that sparked widespread interest in golf in the United States. Ouimet won a three-man playoff against Vardon and Ray (widely regarded as the best golfers in the world at the time), and this led to a dramatic rise in Americans' interest in golf. McDermott, along with Ouimet and Walter Hagen, all three of whom were born between 1891 and 1893, represented the new wave of American-born golf talent. The three showed they could compete on even terms with the best players in the world, and American dominance of golf would be established by the early 1920s, assisted by stars like Gene Sarazen and Bobby Jones.

Golf historian Robert Sommers wrote that, if not for his illness, McDermott could have been the greatest of them all.

== In popular culture ==
Actor Michael Weaver portrays McDermott in the 2005 golf film The Greatest Game Ever Played, which tells the story of Ouimet's 1913 U.S. Open triumph. McDermott appears prominently in one memorable scene where, dashingly dressed and celebrating with a few drinks, he issues a loud, boastful challenge to a group of golfers in the clubhouse, before the start of the tournament; he also features in the golf sequences, contending for a while before falling back. The portrayal is apparently true to character and based primarily on the infamous scene at the Shawnee tournament shortly before the Open began.

== Professional wins (7) ==
=== PGA Tour wins (2) ===
- 1912 U.S. Open
- 1913 Western Open

=== Other wins (5) ===
- 1910 Philadelphia Open Championship
- 1911 U.S. Open, Philadelphia Open Championship
- 1913 Philadelphia Open Championship, Shawnee Open

== Major championships ==
=== Wins (2) ===
Year	Championship	54 holes	Winning score	Margin	Runner(s)-up
1911	U.S. Open	3 shot deficit	+3 (81-72-75-79=307)	Playoff^{1}	(United States) Mike Brady, (United States) George Simpson
1912	U.S. Open (2)	3 shot deficit	−2 (74-75-74-71=294)	2 strokes	(United States) Tom McNamara

^{1}Defeated Mike Brady and George Simpson in an 18-hole playoff – McDermott 80 (+4), Brady 82 (+6), Simpson 85 (+9).

=== Results timeline ===
Tournament	1909	1910	1911	1912	1913	1914
U.S. Open	T49	2	1	1	8	T9
The Open Championship					T5	

Note: McDermott only played in the U.S. Open and The Open Championship.

Win
Top 10
Did not play

"T" indicates a tie for a place

== Team appearances ==
- France–United States Professional Match (representing the United States): 1913
