= George Sargent (golfer) =

English golfer (1882–1962)

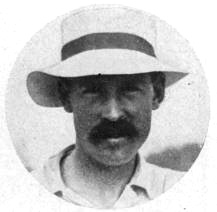

Personal information
- Full name: George Jonathan Sargent
- Nationality: England
- Born: 2 August 1882 Brockham, Surrey, England
- Died: 18 June 1962 (aged 79) Atlanta, Georgia
- Children: 11

Career
- Sport: Golf
- Status: Professional
- Professional wins: 3

Best results in major championships (wins: 1)
- Masters Tournament: T50: 1934
- PGA Championship: T33: 1922
- U.S. Open: Won: 1909
- The Open Championship: 32nd: 1901

George Jonathan Sargent (2 August 1882 – 18 June 1962) was an English professional golfer.

== Early life ==
Sargent was born in Brockham, Surrey, England to William Henry Sargent and Amelia Jane Harkett. The family moved to Epsom when he was young and he began his golf career at age twelve at Epsom Downs Golf Club in his home county.

== Professional career ==
In 1899 Sargent spent some time at Ganton Golf Club under Harry Vardon. He first made an impact in the 1901 Open Championship at Muirfield where we was in 6th place after the first round. Soon afterwards he became the professional at Dewsbury Golf Club. Later he moved to Canada, where he served as a professional at Royal Ottawa Golf Club and finished second in the 1908 Canadian Open.

Sargent won the 1909 U.S. Open at Englewood Golf Club in New Jersey. He set a new 72-hole scoring record for the tournament of 290. He played in sixteen U.S. Open in total, and finished in the top-10 six times. He also won the 1912 Canadian Open and the 1918 Minnesota State Open.

He is credited with introducing the use of motion pictures to study the golf swing. In the early 1910s be started work as a club professional. He was head professional at Scioto Country Club in Ohio from 1912 to 1924. Sargent became a member of the Professional Golfers' Association of America at its inception in 1916 and served as president for five years. After his stay at Scioto he moved onto Interlachen Country Club in Minneapolis, Minnesota from 1924 to 1928. He then moved to Maryland to work at Chevy Chase Club. He worked there from 1928 to 1932. His final club professional job was at East Lake Golf Club in Atlanta, Georgia from 1932 until his retirement fifteen years later. He is a member of the Georgia Golf Hall of Fame.

== Personal life ==
He married Beatrice Margaret Pearse (1886–1968) in 1907 and fathered eleven children.

== Awards and honors ==
Sargent was inducted into the Georgia Hall of Fame during his lifetime

== Professional wins (3) ==
=== PGA Tour wins (1) ===
- 1909 U.S. Open

=== Other wins (2) ===
- 1912 Canadian Open
- 1918 Minnesota State Open

== Major championships ==
=== Wins (1) ===
Year	Championship	54 holes	Winning score	Margin	Runner-up
1909	U.S. Open	2 shot deficit	+2 (75-72-72-71=290)	4 strokes	(United States) Tom McNamara

=== Results timeline ===
Tournament	1901	1902	1903	1904	1905	1906	1907	1908	1909
U.S. Open									1
The Open Championship	32	CUT	WD		CUT				

Tournament	1910	1911	1912	1913	1914	1915	1916	1917	1918	1919
U.S. Open	T16	T7	6	T21	T3	T10	T4	NT	NT	T29
The Open Championship						NT	NT	NT	NT	NT
PGA Championship	NYF	NYF	NYF	NYF	NYF	NYF		NT	NT	

Tournament	1920	1921	1922	1923	1924	1925	1926	1927	1928	1929
U.S. Open	T38	WD		T29	43			T44		
The Open Championship										
PGA Championship			R64							

Tournament	1930	1931	1932	1933	1934	1935	1936	1937	1938	1939
Masters Tournament	NYF	NYF	NYF	NYF	T50	62	WD	WD		
U.S. Open	WD									
The Open Championship										
PGA Championship										

Tournament	1940	1941	1942	1943	1944	1945	1946	1947	1948	1949
Masters Tournament	WD			NT	NT	NT				
U.S. Open		WD	NT	NT	NT	NT				
The Open Championship	NT	NT	NT	NT	NT	NT				
PGA Championship				NT						

Tournament	1950	1951	1952	1953	1954	1955	1956
Masters Tournament							WD
U.S. Open							
The Open Championship							
PGA Championship							

Win
Top 10
Did not play

NYF = Tournament not yet founded
NT = No tournament
WD = Withdrew
CUT = missed the half-way cut
R64, R32, R16, QF, SF = Round in which player lost in PGA Championship match play
"T" indicates a tie for a place
