= Grover Cleveland Golf Course =

Historic golf course in Buffalo, New York, U.S.

- Location within New York
- Type: County Park
- Location: 3781 Main St, Buffalo, New York 14226
- Coordinates: 42°57′40″N 78°48′33″W

The Grover Cleveland Golf Course is a historic golf course located in Buffalo, New York that hosted the 1912 U.S. Open that was founded as The Country Club of Buffalo. It is one of two courses owned by Erie County.

== Course ==
The golf course is located at 3781 Main Street. The 18-hole course is 5,621 yards (5,140 m) (from the back tees) and is a par 69. It has a course rating of 66.5 and a slope rating of 107.

== History ==
The course was founded as The Country Club of Buffalo on February 11, 1889, and was originally located at the intersection of Elmwood Avenue and Nottingham Terrace, near the present-day Delaware Park and SUNY–University at Buffalo. After purchasing the 1823 Samuel Schenck House, which included the Old Stone House, farm and orchard at 3781 Main St, they moved from their site on Elmwood Ave. The CCB built the original club house, polo field, archery field, tennis courts and lastly the 18 hole golf course. Noted architect E.B. Green designed the first clubhouse, which opened in August 1889.

In 1899, the club relocated to make way for the 1901 Pan-American Exposition. The clubhouse became the Women's Center during the Pan-American Exposition. The club acquired land at the intersection of Main Street at Bailey Avenue at the City of Buffalo’s border with the Town of Amherst. The club began construction of a golf course at that time and constructed a clubhouse on the site in 1901. George Cary, who also designed the landmarked Buffalo History Museum, designed the clubhouse. The 18-hole golf course, tennis courts, and a polo field were completed in 1902. In 1910, A.L. Pfitzner, a pilot from Curtiss, made the first airplane flight in Western New York from the club's grounds. In 1910 and 1911, Walter J. Travis renovated the course in anticipation of attracting a major golf tournament.

In 1912, the course hosted the 1912 U.S. Open, won by the defending champion, 20-year-old John J. McDermott, Jr., still the youngest-ever champion and the first American to win the title. McDermott won the tournament with a score of 283.

=== Sale ===
In 1922, the Country Club of Buffalo began acquiring new property, and in 1925, the existing course was sold to the City of Buffalo for $800,000. In 1926, the club completed its relocation to its present location in the Town of Amherst at 250 Youngs Road in Williamsville, New York.

When the club moved to its present location in Amherst, the existing site was renamed Grover Cleveland Park to honor the former Mayor of Buffalo, Governor of New York, and President of the United States. It was at this time, that the Main St. property was rezoned from being part of Amherst, NY to becoming part of Buffalo, NY.

The present course has hosted the U.S. Women's Amateur in 1931, the Curtis Cup in 1950, the Carling Cup Matches in 1960, and the National Junior Girls Championship in 1962.

=== Country Club of Buffalo ===
The transported Country Club of Buffalo, located in the Town of Amherst is a 6,600-yard (6,040 m) (from the back tees), par 72 Donald J. Ross, ASGCA designed golf course also opened in 1926. The course rating is 71.8 and it has a slope rating of 127 on Bent grass. Timothy P. Minahan, CCM manages the course as the general manager. The clubhouse, which overlooks the eighteenth green, was designed by Duane Lyman and opened in 1927.
