= Philadelphia Cricket Club =

Country club in Philadelphia

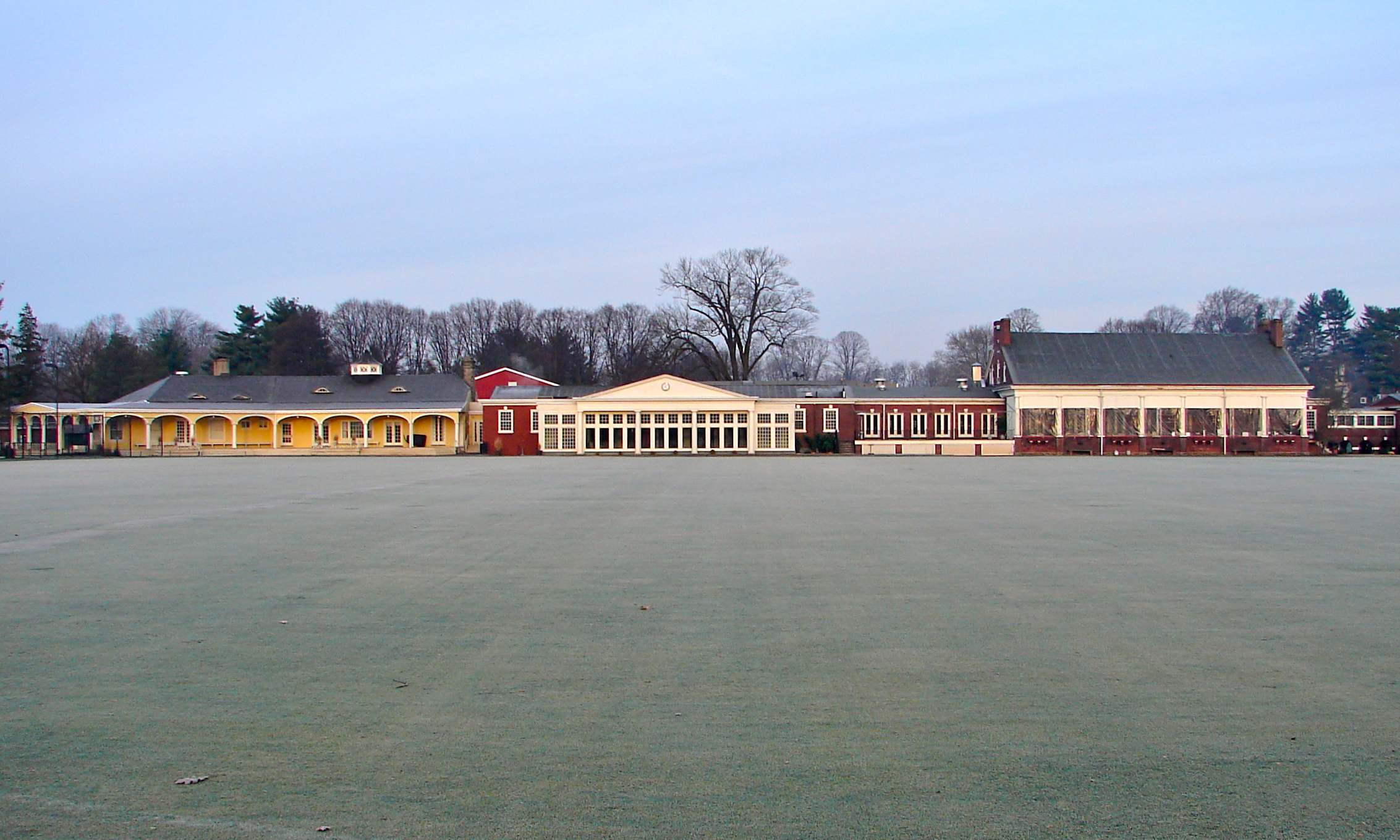
- Chestnut Hill in December 2010
- Formation: 1854; 172 years ago
- Type: Country club
- Tax ID no.: 23-0969420
- Legal status: Open
- Location(s): 415 West Willow Grove Avenue; Chestnut Hill, Philadelphia, Pennsylvania, U.S. and 6025 West Valley Green Road; Flourtown, Pennsylvania, U.S.
- Coordinates: 40°03′52″N 75°12′31″W
- Region served: Philadelphia metropolitan area
- Official language: English
- President: Thomas Sheridan
- Website: philacricket.com

The Philadelphia Cricket Club is a country club in Pennsylvania, United States, being the oldest of its kind in the country.

The club was established in 1854 in southeastern Pennsylvania, and has two locations, one in Chestnut Hill and the other in Flourtown, north-northwest of downtown Philadelphia.

Sports practiced at the club include cricket, golf, squash, swimming, tennis, platform tennis, pickleball, and padel.

== History ==
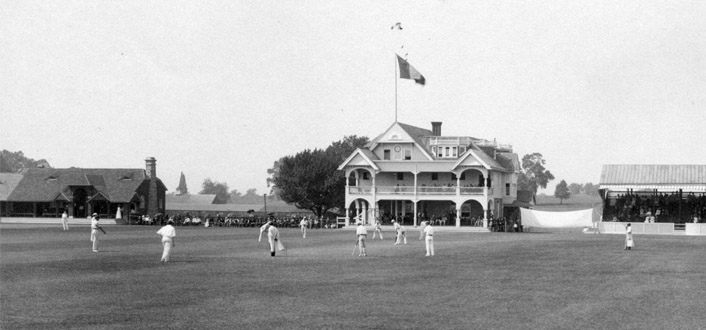
First building, designed by G. W. & W. D. Hewitt, (1883–84). The building was destroyed by fire in 1909

Founded on February 10, 1854, the Philadelphia Cricket Club is the oldest country club in the United States. As the name indicates, the club was formed by a group of young men of English ancestry who had played the game of cricket as students at the University of Pennsylvania. With the wish to continue to play together after their graduation, they formed the club under the leadership of William Rotch Wister.

For the first 30 years of the club's existence, the club did not own any grounds and thus played cricket on any grounds available, such as at Camden, New Jersey. Then, in 1883, the club “came home” to Chestnut Hill due to the generosity of a benefactor, Henry H. Houston. Houston arranged for them to settle down at the club's present location on West Willow Grove Avenue in the St. Martins section of Chestnut Hill.

== Location ==
The Philadelphia Cricket Club has two locations. The original location in Chestnut Hill, Philadelphia where the main offices are located, along with the tennis courts, squash facilities, an eight-lane twenty-five meter swimming pool, and a short nine-hole golf course. The second location is ten minutes away in Whitemarsh Township, near Flourtown, which has two 18-hole golf courses.

== Sports ==
=== Golf ===
Philadelphia Golf Course
- Location in the United States Location in Pennsylvania

Club information
- Location: Philadelphia and Flourtown, Pennsylvania, U.S.
- Established: 1854; 172 years ago
- Type: Private
- Owner: Philadelphia Cricket Club
- Operator: Head PGA Professional – Jim Smith Jr.
- Total holes: 45
- Tournaments: U.S. Open (1907, 1910), Senior Players Championship (2016), U.S. Amateur Four-Ball (2024), Truist Championship (2025)
- Greens: Bentgrass
- Fairways: Bentgrass

Saint Martins
- Designed by: Willie Tucker
- Par: 35
- Length: 2,617 yards (2,393 m)
- Course rating: 33.2
- Slope rating: 119

Wissahickon
- Designed by: A.W. Tillinghast (1922), Keith Foster (2014 restoration)
- Par: 70
- Length: 7,119 yards (6,510 m)
- Course rating: 74.7
- Slope rating: 138

Militia Hill
- Designed by: Dana Fry & Michael Hurdzan
- Par: 72
- Length: 7,227 yards (6,608 m)
- Course rating: 74.9
- Slope rating: 140

When the Golf Association of Philadelphia was organized in 1897, the club was one of four founding members with Merion, Philadelphia Country Club, and Aronimink. Both the Wissahickon and Militia Hill courses have been recognized for their outstanding layouts and course conditions over the years. (Wissahickon was ranked #98 in Golf Magazine’s top 100 United States course rankings for 2024-25 and Militia Hill is ranked as a top-25 golf course in Pennsylvania).

==== St. Martins Course ====
The original nine-hole course was built in 1895 by famed architect Willie Tucker (St. Andrew's Golf Club, Sand Point Country Club, and Argyle Country Club) and was quickly replaced by a new eighteen-hole course in 1897. The old eighteen-hole course, known as St. Martins and now playing as a nine-hole layout, hosted the United States Open Championship in 1907 and 1910. The 1907 winner was Alec Ross, brother of famed architect Donald Ross, who chalked up a remarkable score of 302 for 72 holes. It was also during this championship that the first hole-in-one in U.S. Open competition was achieved by Jack Hobens. The 1910 Open victory went to Alex Smith, who shot 71 on the final day. Also entered that year was Cricket Club's own professional, Scottish-born Willie Anderson, the first of four players to win the U.S. Open four times, later joined by Bobby Jones, Ben Hogan, and Jack Nicklaus; Anderson remains the only one to win in three consecutive. This course is named "St. Martins" after the adjacent Episcopal church, St. Martin-in-the-Fields. In 2015, the St. Martins course was sold to the club by the Woodward family as part of an open space initiative. Hosted the World Hickory Match Play Invitational (2014–16) & the National Hickory Championship in 2017 on the St Martins course.

U.S. Open champions and scores

Year	Champion	Score
1907	(Scotland) Alec Ross	76–74–76–76=302
1910	(Scotland) Alex Smith	73–73–79–73=298

Course scorecard (men's tees)

Key	1	2	3	4	5	6	7	8	9	Total
Par	4	4	4	4	3	4	4	4	4	35
Handicap	5	7	1	6	9	4	2	3	8	—N/a
Yards	343	257	322	289	110	316	368	326	222	2553

==== Wissahickon Course ====
A large tract of land was purchased in 1920, because the Club did not own the grounds on which the St. Martins golf course was built. It was A. W. Tillinghast (Bethpage Black, Baltusrol, Oak Hills, Newport Country Club, San Francisco Golf Club and Winged Foot) who recommended the Flourtown site and who designed the new course, which opened in 1922. The Wissahickon course is one of the few remaining courses designed by Tillinghast that has had minimal changes over the past 80 years. The name "Wissahickon" comes from the Lenape word for "Catfish Stream." The Wissahickon Creek runs adjacent to the course. Lorraine Run, which eventually dumps into the Wissahickon Creek, runs through the Wissahickon course. An abandoned Reading Railroad track runs through the course, along the 6th and 11th holes.

On June 18, 2013, construction was started on a complete restoration of the Wissahickon course, led by designer Keith Foster and Director of Grounds Dan Meersman.

Since the completion of the 2014 renovation, Wissahickon has hosted the 2014 Philadelphia Open, the 2015 PGA Professional National Championship (with Militia Hill), the 2016 Senior Players Championship, the 2024 U.S. Amateur Four-Ball, and the 2025 Truist Championship, a signature event on the PGA Tour. The course is dedicated to A.W. Tillinghast, who was a long-time member of the Philadelphia Cricket Club and a native of Philadelphia.

The course also hosted the third Creator Classic, an event for golf influencers organized by the PGA Tour.

Course scorecard

Wissahickon
Tee	Rating/Slope	1	2	3	4	5	6	7	8	9	Out	10	11	12	13	14	15	16	17	18	In	Total
I–Championship	74.8/140	424	423	122	517	215	498	553	365	373	3490	172	427	546	447	435	240	426	449	487	3629	7119
II–Back	72.8/134	395	396	115	487	197	475	514	347	350	3276	147	386	538	409	411	217	408	419	469	3404	6680
III–Middle	70.4/130	388	368	107	464	160	432	492	323	336	3070	120	338	491	393	369	181	388	382	446	3108	6178
IV–Forward	67/129	368	325	97	410	134	391	440	301	297	2763	114	324	421	341	287	153	341	348	417	2746	5509
Par	Men	4	4	3	4	3	4	5	4	4	35	3	4	5	4	4	3	4	4	4	35	70
SI	Men	13	7	17	3	15	5	1	11	9		18	16	10	8	2	14	12	6	4
Par	Women	5	4	3	5	3	5	5	4	4	38	3	4	5	4	4	3	4	4	5	36	74
SI	Women	9	3	15	5	17	11	1	7	13		18	12	6	10	2	16	8	14	4

==== Militia Hill Course ====
In 1999, the Board of Governors made a decision to begin the development of a third golf course located on land acquired in the original purchase of the Flourtown property nearly eighty years before. After submissions by several top designers, the club selected Michael Hurdzan and Dana Fry, who had already designed a number of highly rated courses throughout the United States and Canada (Erin Hills, Calusa Pines, Hamilton Farms and Naples National). The club named the new course ‘Militia Hill’ in honor of the adjacent Militia Hill section of Fort Washington State Park, which had been occupied during the American Revolution by the Pennsylvania Militia just before moving on to their legendary winter encampment at Valley Forge. Like the Wissahickon course, a train track runs through the middle of the golf course. Although this line is active, and golfers pass through a tunnel (which was constructed well before the golf course) twice each round. The course is dedicated to Willie Anderson, a member of the World Golf Hall of Fame, who at one point, early in the 20th century, was the head golf professional at the club.

Course scorecard

Militia Hill
Tee	Rating/Slope	1	2	3	4	5	6	7	8	9	Out	10	11	12	13	14	15	16	17	18	In	Total
I–Championship	75/136	410	405	538	391	188	578	447	404	244	3605	420	160	397	475	529	227	394	585	435	3622	7227
II–Back	72.8/133	384	376	493	373	169	555	441	376	225	3392	399	130	379	446	507	199	371	561	411	3403	6795
III–Middle	71/125	349	333	479	339	147	527	409	342	202	3127	368	119	362	426	484	167	345	535	380	3186	6313
IV–Forward	67/119	309	295	446	305	111	463	332	310	170	2741	297	102	319	351	437	141	290	459	312	2708	5449
Par	Men	4	4	5	4	3	5	4	4	3	36	4	3	4	4	5	3	4	5	4	36	72
SI	Men	15	7	5	9	13	1	3	11	17		6	18	14	10	2	16	12	4	8
Par	Women	4	4	5	4	3	5	4	4	3	36	4	3	4	4	5	3	4	5	4	36	72
SI	Women	5	1	3	9	15	7	11	13	17		10	18	12	8	2	16	14	4	6

=== Cricket ===
The cricket team was initially disbanded in 1924 but was later revived in 1998. The club is now one of the hosts of the annual Philadelphia International Cricket Festival.

=== Soccer ===
Philadelphia has a past in soccer so by 1902, this sport had become popular among cricket clubs in the city of Philadelphia so they decided to establish a league, named "Philadelphia Cricket Clubs League". The popularity of the sport also attracted some collegiate teams to the league, such as Haverford. Philadelphia C.C. participated in the tournament from 1902 to 1920.

=== Squash ===
Eight singles courts and two hardball doubles courts round out PCC's squash program. Rich Wade is the director of squash. PCC has coached many national champions and countless players who went on to play intercollegiate squash.

=== Swimming ===
In 2019 PCC won the Country Club Swim Association of Greater Philadelphia League Championship.

In 2006 the swimming team placed fourth at the Country Club Swimming Association of Greater Philadelphia's League Championships led by the William Penn Charter's high school swimming coach Kevin Berkoff.

=== Tennis; Lawn, Pickleball, & Platform ===
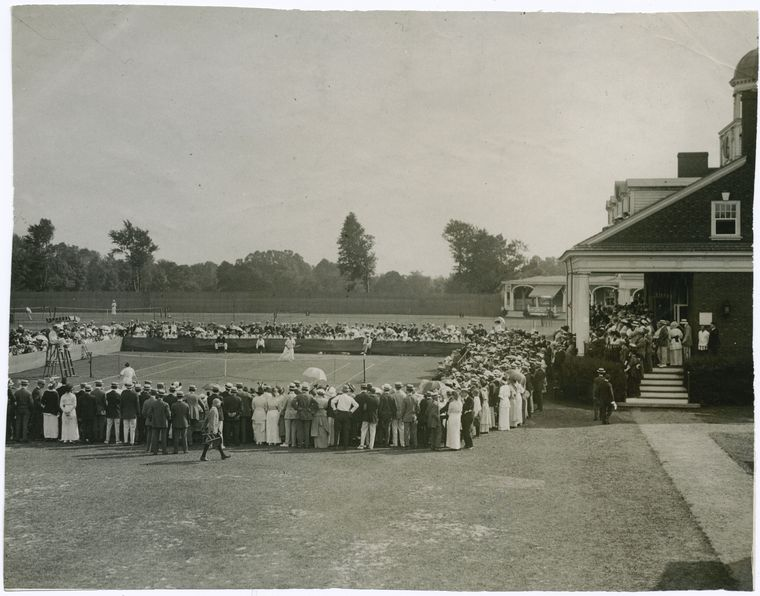
National Women's Tennis Tournament at the Philadelphia Cricket Club. Photo: circa 1910–20

In 1881, the club was one of the founding members of the United States Lawn Tennis Association, today the USTA. The club hosted the inaugural U.S. Women's National Singles Championship in 1887, and continued to host the event until 1921, when it moved to Forest Hills. The Women's National Doubles Championship (which started in 1889) and Mixed Doubles Championship (which started in 1892) were also held at the club until 1921. These events later combined with the men's singles and doubles championships to form the U.S. Open.

Annually, the club hosts the USTA 30-35 and 70s age group championships.

The club operates 18 rotating grass courts, nine HydroClay courts, and two indoor hard courts.

==== Platform Tennis ====
In 2014, the platform tennis hut was listed as one of the most impressive by Town & Country. The club hosted the 2017 Philly Cricket Invitational for American Platform Tennis Association finals and was one of the National Championship hosts.

The club has 4 permanent platform tennis courts.

==== Pickleball ====
Pickleball became a prominent sport at PCC in 2019. Constructing six outdoor courts and eight temporary indoor courts on the indoor tennis courts.

=== Trapshooting ===
Due to the extensive efforts in recent years of the Trapshooting Committee, trapshooting has become a thriving sport at PCC. Competitions are held November through April at clubs around the Philadelphia region.

== See also ==
- Philadelphian cricket team
- Merion Cricket Club
- Germantown Cricket Club
- Belmont Cricket Club

Preceded by None (event created)	Host of US Open Women's Singles; 1887–1920	Succeeded by Forest Hills
Preceded by None (event created)	Host of US Open Women's Doubles; 1889–1920	Succeeded by Forest Hills
Preceded by None (event created)	Host of US Open Mixed Doubles; 1888–1920	Succeeded by Forest Hills
Preceded by Onwentsia Club; Englewood Golf Club	Host of United States Open Championship; 1907; 1910	Succeeded by Myopia Hunt Club; Chicago Golf Club
