= Jack Campbell (golfer) =

Scottish golfer (1878–1955)

John D. Campbell (21 May 1878 – 23 July 1955) was a Scottish professional golfer. Campbell was born in Troon, Scotland and came to the United States in 1900. He became an assistant to brother Alec "Nipper" Campbell at The Country Club in Brookline, Massachusetts. Campbell placed sixth in the 1903 U.S. Open and won three Philadelphia Open Championships.

Campbell was a golf pro at Huntingdon Valley Country Club and Overbrook Golf Club then went to north New Jersey for three years. In 1912, he came back to Pennsylvania and finished his career at Old York Road Country Club. His appointment to the Huntingdon Valley Country Club in Philadelphia in 1903 marked only the fourth professional at the club, which was started in 1897. Campbell was 25 years old. In his first year at Huntingdon Valley, he won the inaugural Philadelphia Open Championship, a 72-hole stroke play event for Philadelphia professionals. In 1905, he left the club, returned to Brookline to work for his brother for a short period and then returned to the Philadelphia area as the head pro at the Langhorne Country Club, now Middletown Country Club. He participated in the 1905 Philadelphia Open Championship which was held at Huntingdon Valley but lost to Willie Thomson, who was the head pro at the club whom Jack Campbell replaced in 1903.

== Professional wins ==
this list may be incomplete

- 1903 Philadelphia Open Championship
- 1904 Philadelphia Open Championship
- 1908 Philadelphia Open Championship
- 1926 Philadelphia PGA Championship
