= Englewood Golf Club =

Golf course in New Jersey, U.S.

- Location within the United States Location within New Jersey Location within New York City
- 40.872°N 73.975°W

Club information
- Location: Englewood, New Jersey; Leonia, New Jersey, U.S.
- Elevation: 50–180 feet (15–55 m)
- Established: 1896; 130 years ago Closed 1977
- Type: Private
- Tota holes: 18
- Tournaments: U.S. Amateur: (1906); U.S. Open: (1909); Metropolitan Open: (1911)
- Designed by: Harry Stark; Donald Ross; Alec Ternyei
- Par: 71
- Length: 6,205 yards (5,674 m) (for 1909 U.S. Open)

The Englewood Golf Club, also sometimes known as the Englewood Golf and Country Club, was a private golf course in Bergen County, New Jersey, United States, located in Englewood and Leonia, just west of New York City. Opened as a nine-hole course in 1896, a second nine was added four years later; it hosted the U.S. Amateur in 1906 and the U.S. Open in 1909.

During the 1950s, the club became a popular spot for entertainers and athletes, and for a while was co-owned by several comedians. The course was split in half by construction of a portion of Interstate 95 in 1963, but play continued. Financial and other problems ensued, however, and the club closed in 1977. Houses and condominiums were built over the course during the 1980s.

Throughout its existence, the golf course was used by children for sledding in the winter.

== Beginnings ==
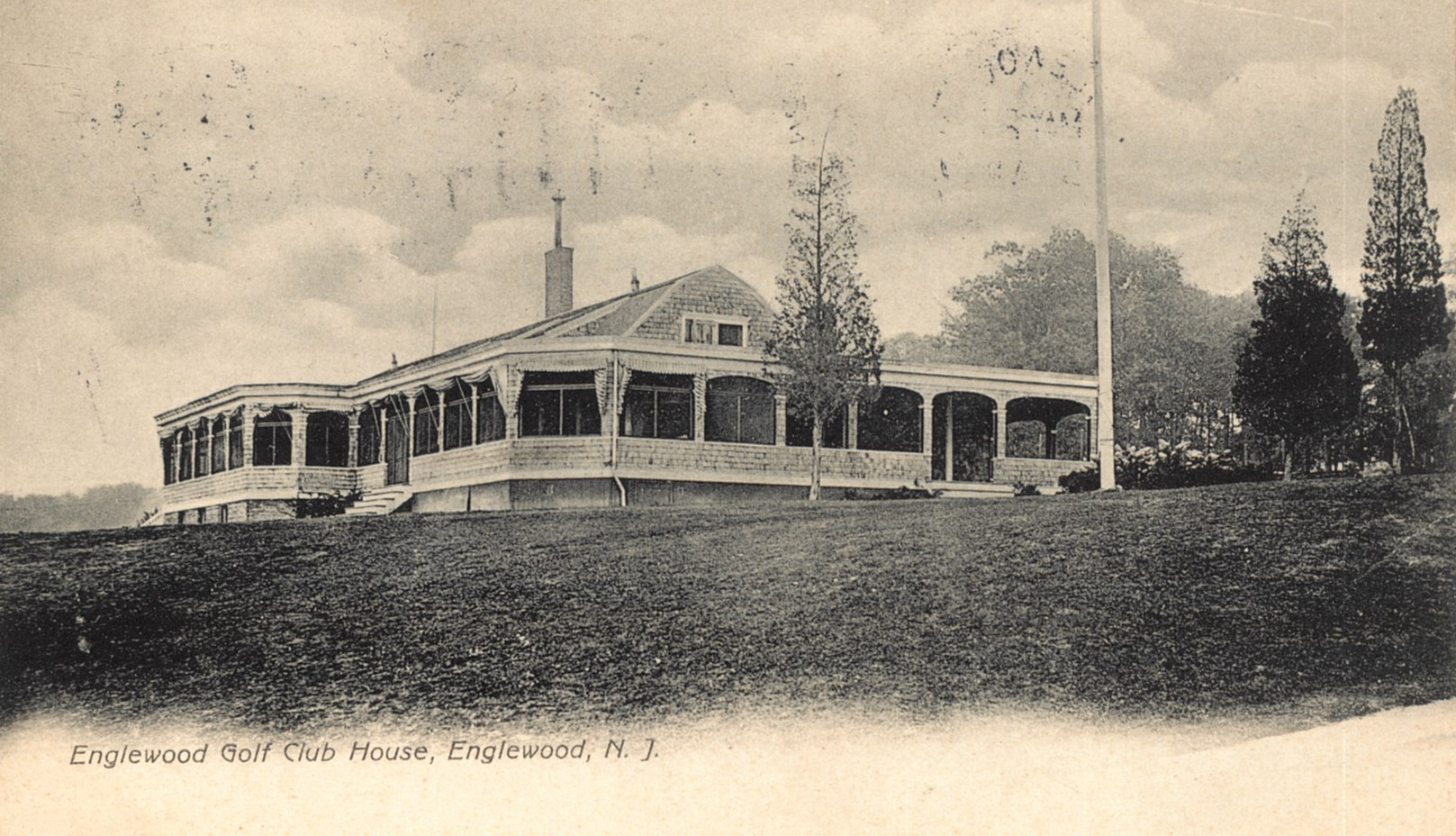
The clubhouse, located on the Englewood side, c. 1908

As an organization, the Englewood Golf Club was formed in early 1896 and a nine-hole course was laid out by Harry Stark, a Scotsman who also managed the course. The course was built along a series of smaller hills, running down the overall cuesta slope descending from The Palisades. The Englewood Golf Club officially opened on June 6, 1896, with a long drive competition followed by nine holes of golf. It was one of the first golf courses in the United States. (Newspaper stories sometimes stated that it was the second oldest in the country, but such claims have been common in various parts of the nation, and a number of clubs and courses are known to have been created earlier.)

The following year saw the leasing of 50 more acres (20 ha) of land and the building of a clubhouse. The club had 112 members in its first year, almost evenly divided between men and women, and over 250 members by 1900. The young Dwight Morrow is said to have been an original member there. The club was one of the first to allow golfing on Sundays.

== Championships ==
The successful staging of the U.S. Amateur in 1906, then the most prestigious tournament in the nation, resulting in the U.S. Open coming to the venue. The playing of the 1909 U.S. Open featured several scoring records, including two golfers breaking 70 in an Open for the first time. The 1911 Metropolitan Open was another nationally visible tournament that the course hosted, which again featured scoring records and a growing belief that the course was not difficult enough for championship play.

The noted golf course architect Donald Ross made alterations in 1916 to make the course tougher by adding bunkering and changing the contours of the greens. However, the inability to lengthen the course due to the constraints of the property, together with the opening of many excellent courses during the 1920s, meant Englewood Golf Club would not be used for further top-level championships.

The course at this point was what one golf writer has termed "a short but highly engaging test". The front nine was unusual in having seven par-4 holes, including the first five holes; the back nine by comparison had three par-3 holes, each of which presented different challenges. Most of the holes of the layout ran parallel to Broad Avenue rather than being up-or-down with the slope; a brook ran through parts of the property, mostly at or near the bottom of the slope, and came into play on nearly half the holes.

In 1926, the club hosted the wedding reception of New York Post editor Joseph Cookman and his bride Mary Bass, editor of the Ladies Home Journal. As a venue, the course gave good views of the valley of the Hackensack River and of the Ramapo Mountains.

== Celebrities ==
The club went bankrupt following World War II. After a failed attempt by the members to run it themselves, the club's property was bought by the Reis family and leased to various operators. The first such lessee was Jerry Volpe, who became the head professional at the club, a position he would hold for nearly two decades. Under Volpe, it became a public golf course, a characteristic it held for seven years until reverting back to private in 1953.

In 1956, a 49 percent share of the lease was bought by four popular comedians who lived in Bergen County and played golf at the course: Phil Foster, Dick Shawn, Joey Bishop, and Buddy Hackett, with Volpe retaining the majority share of the lease. Other entertainment figures frequented the club, including comedian Corbett Monica. Star athletes from the New York sports world came to the club too, including Willie Mays, Whitey Ford, Billy Martin, and Rocky Graziano.

For decades, the course with its hills was used by children in winter for sledding. In Leonia, while there were some streets that would be closed for sledding, the golf course was still the favorite location. Sleigh riding, bobsledding, and skiing also took place on the course.

== Interstate ==
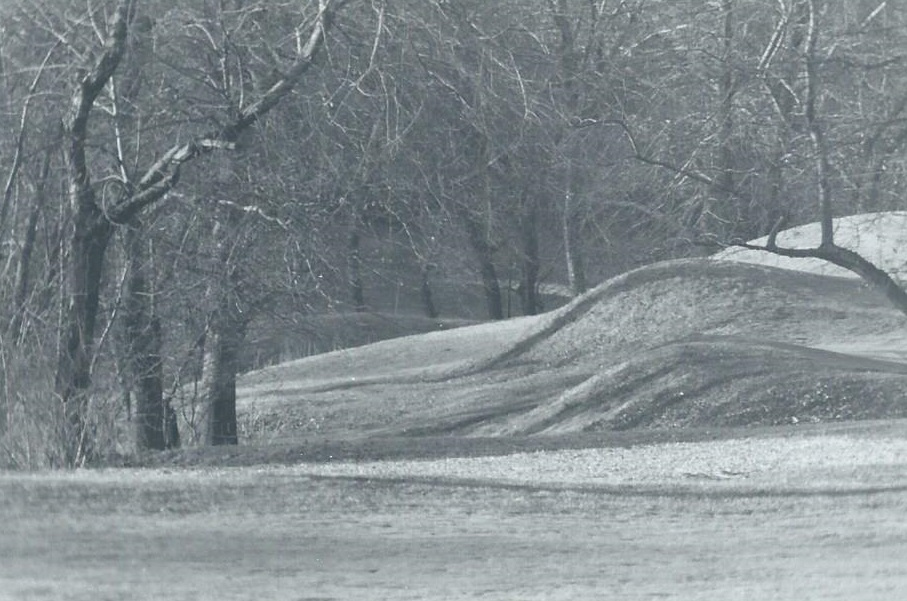
The hills, mounds, and trees of the course, as seen on the Leonia side in the early 1970s; a green with a flagstick can be seen just left of center in the distance

In 1963, the course was severely affected by construction of what was then known as the Bergen-Passaic Expressway, a piece of Interstate 95 in New Jersey that made a direct connection to the George Washington Bridge. The owners of the club's land lost 18 acres (7.3 ha) from their original 104 acres (42 ha) and were awarded $360,000 (equal to $3.8 million in 2025) in compensation for the portion of their property that was condemned. This new portion of the New Jersey Turnpike was built on the border between Englewood and Leonia (after officials of each town had battled against proposals that would have had the path going solely through their town) and in doing so bisected the golf course, with 50 of the remaining acres (20 ha) in Leonia and 36 acres (15 ha) in Englewood. The clubhouse, which was in the northeast corner of the property, was in Englewood.

The arrival of the interstate caused the departure of Volpe. The layout was redone by the new club professional, Alec Ternyei, in order to still provide 18 holes of golf. Four holes were reassembled in a different flow; in the new routing, golfers were forced to walk on Broad Avenue, underneath the expressway, to get from the sixth green to the seventh tee.

In 1964, the lessee became a holding company partly run by Anthony Scotto, an officer of Local 1814 of the International Longshoremen's Association, although Scotto stated that it was his wife who represented that company. It was an issue because under the Labor-Management Improper Practices Act, ownership of the golf club would be in a conflict-of-interest situation with respect to his position in the union. This question of ownership became part of a lengthy investigation into Scotto's activities by the Waterfront Commission of New York Harbor. Scotto was a controversial figure, seen by some as a progressive leader of organized labor and a philanthropist but by others as an opportunistic hoodlum involved in racketeering. The Englewood Golf Club already had several people known to be frequenting it who were reputed to be in the rackets, including Angelo DeCarlo and Thomas Eboli, as well as Anthony Provenzano and the gambler Frank Erickson. Scotto was informed that the club's liquor license would not be renewed unless such people were no longer seen at the club, and in 1965 Scotto instructed these persons to play elsewhere. Scotto's company sold the club in 1973.

== End ==
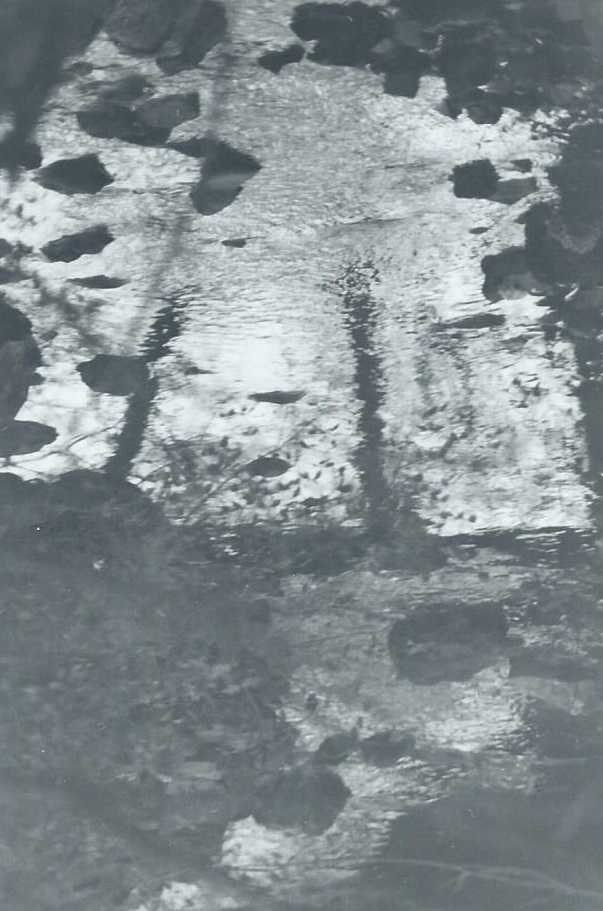
A portion of the brook that ran through the bottom of the course

Golfing continued on the divided course, but the financial burden became too great. During the mid-1970s, the club was run by a different lessee each year, some of which failed to pay rent or were charged with violations of health regulations. During this time the property had a short-lived name change to the Rolling Hills Country Club, before reverting to the Englewood Golf and Country Club name variant.

Then as 1977 progressed, the club's liquor license was suspended by the New Jersey Division of Alcoholic Beverage Control and the lessees were also behind on the rent. At this point the property owner had had enough, and the club was closed and padlocked on October 17, 1977. In January 1978, the clubhouse burned down in a fire of suspicious origin.

Sledding on the course in winter continued for a few years even after the club was closed.

Both Leonia and Englewood were interested in buying the golf course property and preserving it for recreational use, and started a process towards getting a Green Acres designation and funding for that purpose, but in Leonia a referendum to support this idea failed and in Englewood the local officials changed their minds in favor of the income that development would generate. Construction of 128 single-family homes on one-quarter of an acre (0.10 ha) lots had begun on the Leonia side by 1982. And construction of a 339-unit group of townhouses on the Englewood side was underway by 1986, in a condominiums complex that would be called Cross Creek Point.

Other than a street called Golf Course Drive on the Leonia side, there is little physical indication that the Englewood Golf Club ever existed.
