= Alex Smith (golfer) =

Scottish-American professional golfer (1874–1930)

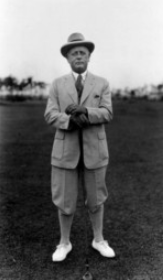
- Smith, c. 1913

Personal information
- Full name: Alexander Smith
- Nationality: Scotland; United States
- Born: 28 January 1874 Dundee, Angus, Scotland
- Died: 21 April 1930 (aged 56) Baltimore, Maryland
- Spouse: Jessie Maiden
- Children: 2

Career
- Sport: Golf
- Status: Professional
- Professional wins: 8

Best results in major championships (wins: 2)
- Masters Tournament: NYF
- PGA Championship: T9: 1916
- U.S. Open: Won: 1906, 1910
- The Open Championship: T16: 1905

Alexander Smith (28 January 1874 – 21 April 1930) was a Scottish-American professional golfer who played in the late 19th and early 20th century.

== Early life ==
Smith was born in Carnoustie, Scotland, on 28 January 1874, the son of John D. Smith and Joann Smith (née Robinson). On 18 January 1895, he was married to Jessie Maiden—sister of James Maiden—and they had two daughters, Fannie and Margaret, born in 1896 and 1899, respectively. Smith was sometimes referred to as "Alec" Smith, especially early in his career.

His brother Willie Smith won the U.S. Open in 1899.

== Professional career ==
Smith was the head professional at Nassau Country Club in Glen Cove, New York, from 1901 through 1909. James Maiden, who would forge a successful golf career of his own, served as assistant professional under Smith at Nassau.

In 1901, Smith lost to Willie Anderson in a playoff for the U.S. Open title. Smith's 1906 U.S. Open victory came at the Onwentsia Club in Lake Forest, Illinois. His 72-hole score of 295 was the lowest at either the U.S. Open or the British Open up to that time, and he won $300. The 1910 U.S. Open was played over the St. Martin's course at the Philadelphia Cricket Club. Smith won a three-man playoff against American John McDermott and another of his own brothers, Macdonald Smith. Alex Smith played in eighteen U.S. Opens in total and accumulated eleven top ten placings.

Smith, who partnered with C. A. Dunning in the 1905 Metropolitan Open four-ball tournament held on 16 September 1905 at Fox Hills Golf Club on Staten Island, tied for first place with George Low and Fred Herreshoff with a score of 71. A playoff wasn't held due to the fact that Smith was also competing in the medal competition which he won from Willie Anderson.

Smith also won the Western Open twice and the Metropolitan Open four times.

He was the head professional at the Westchester Country Club in Rye, New York. After the death of his brother, Willie Smith, he took over responsibility for the design of Club de Golf Chapultepec.

== Personal life ==
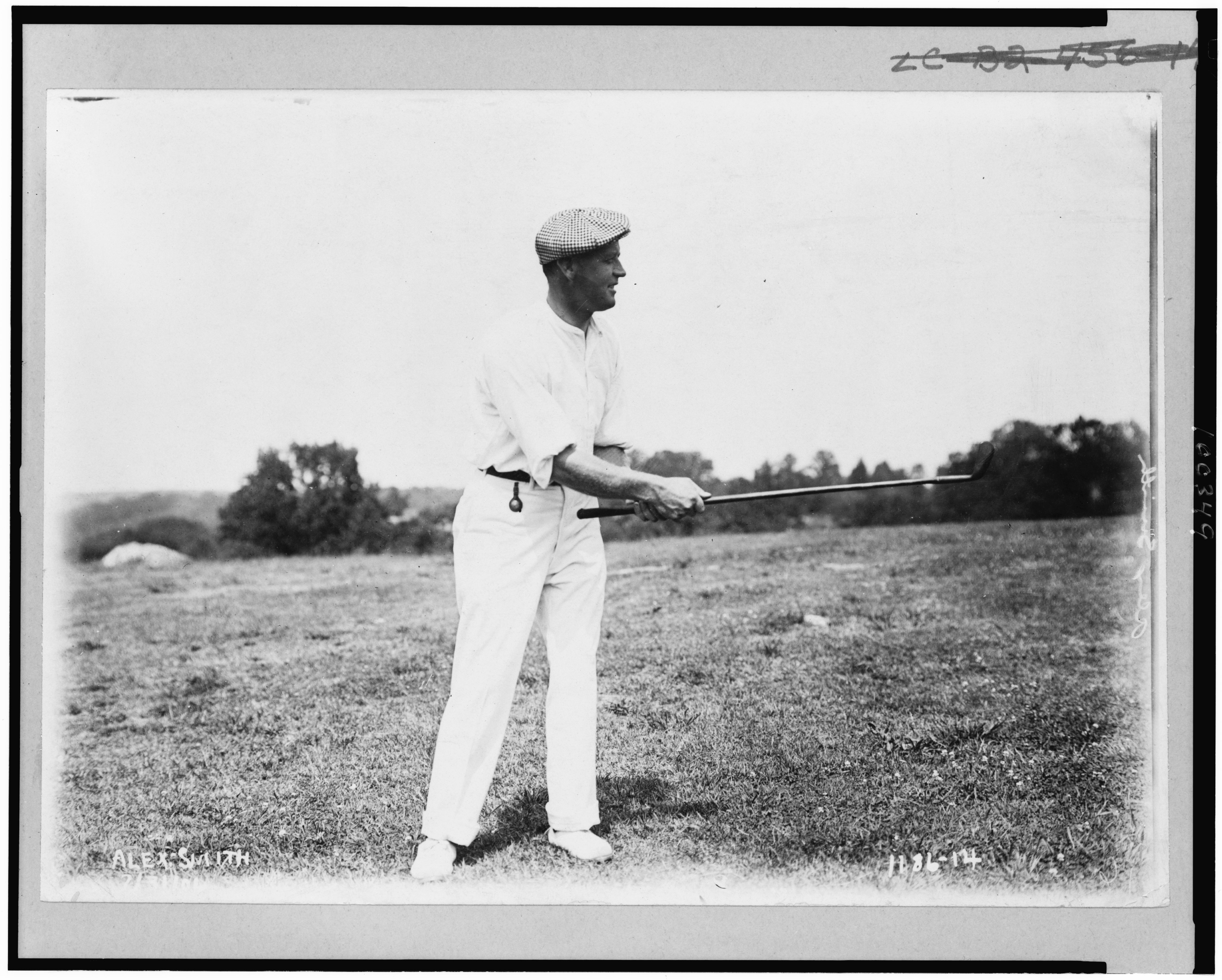
Alex Smith in 1906

In 1910, Smith was a widower and lived with his two young daughters and sister-in-law, Allison Barry, in New Rochelle, New York.

Smith died on 21 April 1930 at a sanatorium in Baltimore, Maryland.

== Professional wins (8) ==
Note: This list may be incomplete

=== PGA Tour wins (3) ===
- 1903 Western Open
- 1906 **U.S. Open**, Western Open

=== Other wins (5) ===
- 1905 Metropolitan Open
- 1909 Metropolitan Open
- 1910 **U.S. Open**, Metropolitan Open
- 1913 Metropolitan Open

Note: major championships in bold

== Major championships ==
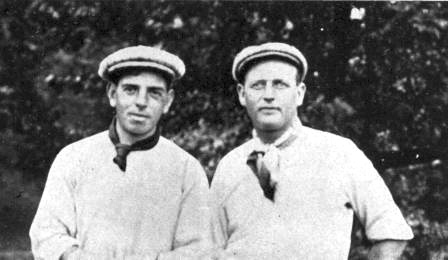
Alex Smith (right) with Willie Anderson

=== Wins (2) ===
Year	Championship	54 Holes	Winning score	Margin	Runner(s)-up
1906	U.S. Open	3 shot lead	(73-74-73-75=295)	7 strokes	(Scotland) Willie Smith
1910	U.S. Open (2)	2 shot deficit	+6 (73-73-79-73=298)	Playoff^{1}	(United States) John McDermott, (Scotland) Macdonald Smith

^{1}Defeated John McDermott and MacDonald Smith in an 18-hole playoff – A. Smith 71 (−2), McDermott 75 (+2) & M. Smith 77 (+4).

=== Results timeline ===
Smith died before the Masters Tournament was founded.

Tournament	1898	1899	1900	1901	1902	1903	1904	1905	1906	1907	1908	1909
U.S. Open	2	7	13	2	T18	4	18	2	**1**		3	3
The Open Championship								T16		T25		

Tournament	1910	1911	1912	1913	1914	1915	1916	1917	1918	1919	1920	1921
U.S. Open	**1**	T23	T3	T16		T22		NT	NT	WD		T5
The Open Championship						NT	NT	NT	NT	NT		
PGA Championship	NYF	NYF	NYF	NYF	NYF	NYF	R16	NT	NT			

Win
Top 10
Did not play

NYF = Tournament not yet founded
NT = No tournament
WD = Withdrew
"T" indicates a tie for a place

== Team appearances ==
- France–United States Professional Match (representing the United States): 1913
