= Willie Anderson (golfer) =

Scottish-American golfer (1879–1910)

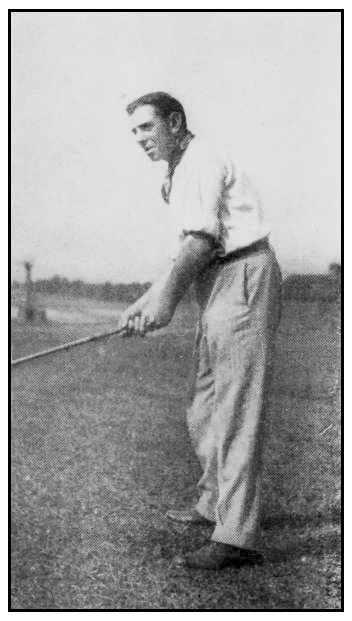
- Anderson at the 1909 Western Open

Personal information
- Full name: William Law Anderson
- Nationality: Scotland
- Born: 21 October 1879 North Berwick, Scotland
- Died: 25 October 1910 (aged 31) Chestnut Hill, Philadelphia, Pennsylvania, U.S.
- Spouse: Agnes Beakley

Career
- Sport: Golf
- Turned professional: 1896
- Professional wins: 9

Best results in major championships (wins: 4)
- U.S. Open: Won: 1901, 1903, 1904, 1905

Achievements and awards
- World Golf Hall of Fame: 1975 (member page)

William Law Anderson (21 October 1879 – 25 October 1910) was a Scottish-American golfer who became the first man to win four U.S. Opens, with victories in 1901, 1903, 1904, and 1905. Although Bobby Jones, Ben Hogan, and Jack Nicklaus equalled his total of four championships, Anderson remains the only man to win three consecutive U.S. Open titles, as of 2026. He is a member of the World Golf Hall of Fame.

== Early life ==
Born in North Berwick, in East Lothian, Scotland, Anderson was educated at the public school in North Berwick and was a licensed caddie on the West Links at the age of 11. Upon leaving school, he apprenticed as a club maker under Alex Aitken in Gullane.

At age 18, Anderson emigrated from Scotland to the United States in March 1896—sailing aboard the S.S. Poseidon from Glasgow—along with his father, Thomas Anderson, and his brother Tom, landing at Ellis Island. He played in the U.S. Open the following year, finishing in second place by one stroke, after Joe Lloyd eagled the final hole.

== Golf career ==
His first significant win came in 1899 at the Southern California Open before he started his run at the U.S. Open. In the 14 straight Opens that he played, Anderson won four, was second once, third once, fourth twice, fifth three times, 11th twice and 15th once. He won titles with both the old gutta-percha golf ball, and the rubber-cored ball which came into use in 1902. Anderson also won the Western Open in 1902, 1904, 1908, and 1909; this tournament, the second-oldest in the U.S., was classified as a PGA Tour event for most of its more than 100 years of operation, and is classified by some golf historians as a major championship during Anderson's era.

Anderson's accuracy with all clubs, combined with his concentration under pressure, made him a formidable and highly respected competitor. Anderson made his living as a golf professional, working at ten different clubs in fourteen years. He listed the Apawamis Club in Rye, New York as his home course from 1901 through 1906. He played many exhibition challenge matches for stakes, in addition to tournaments.

== Death and legacy ==
Anderson died at age 31, officially from epilepsy in Chestnut Hill, Philadelphia, Pennsylvania. He had played competitive matches in Pennsylvania right up to a few days before his death. However, golf historian Robert Sommers wrote in 1995 that Anderson "drank himself to death." Anderson is buried in Ivy Hill Cemetery in Philadelphia.

== Awards and honors ==
Anderson was an original member of the PGA Hall of Fame and in 1975 he was inducted into the World Golf Hall of Fame

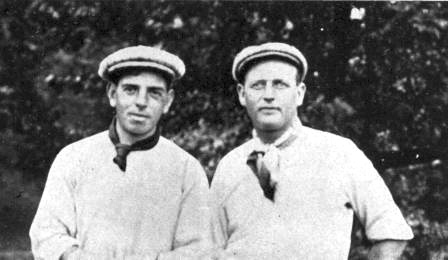
Willie Anderson (left) with Alex Smith, whom he beat in a playoff to win in 1901

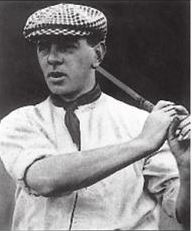
Willie Anderson, c. 1905

== Major championships ==
=== Wins (4) ===
Year	Championship	54 holes	Winning score	Margin	Runner-up
1901	U.S. Open	1 shot deficit	84-83-83-81=331	Playoff ^{1}	(Scotland) Alex Smith
1903	U.S. Open (2)	6 shot lead	73-76-76-82=307	Playoff ^{2}	(Scotland) David Brown
1904	U.S. Open (3)	2 shot deficit	75-78-78-72=303	5 strokes	(United States) Gilbert Nicholls
1905	U.S. Open (4)	1 shot deficit	81-80-76-77=314	2 strokes	(Scotland) Alex Smith

^{1} Defeated Alex Smith in an 18-hole playoff: Anderson (85), Smith (86)
^{2} Defeated David Brown in an 18-hole playoff: Anderson (82), Brown (84)

=== Results timeline ===
Among the majors, Anderson played in only the U.S. Open.

Tournament	1897	1898	1899	1900	1901	1902	1903	1904	1905	1906	1907	1908	1909	1910
U.S. Open	2	3	5	T11	1	T5	1	1	1	5	15	4	T4	11

Win
Top 10

"T" indicates a tie for a place

== Professional wins (9) ==
Note: this list may be incomplete

- 1899 Southern California Open
- 1901 U.S. Open
- 1902 Western Open
- 1903 U.S. Open
- 1904 Western Open, U.S. Open
- 1905 U.S. Open
- 1908 Western Open
- 1909 Western Open

== See also ==
- Golf in Scotland
- List of men's major championships winning golfers
