= Tom McNamara (golfer) =

American professional golfer (1882–1939)

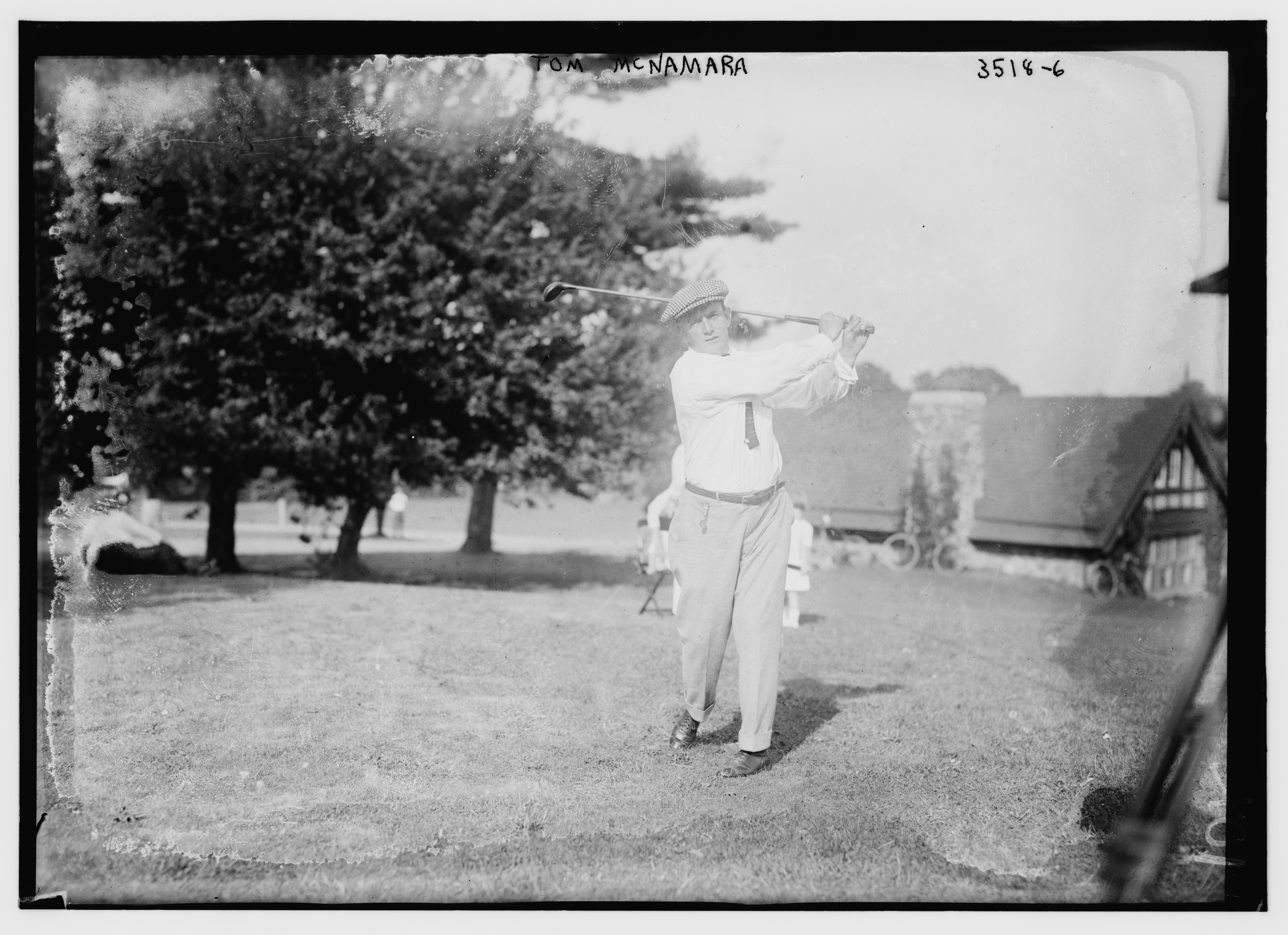
- McNamara at the 1915 U.S. Open

Personal information
- Full name: Thomas Lawrence McNamara, Sr.
- Nickname: Tommy Mac
- Nationality: United States
- Born: November 18, 1882 Brookline, Massachusetts, U.S.
- Died: July 21, 1939 (aged 56) Mount Vernon, New York, U.S.
- Spouse: Mary Ellen Jones
- Children: 7

Career
- Sport: Golf
- Status: Professional
- Professional wins: 7

Number of wins by tour
- PGA Tour: 1
- Other: 6

Best results in major championships
- Masters Tournament: DNP
- PGA Championship: T9: 1919
- U.S. Open: 2nd: 1909, 1912, 1915
- The Open Championship: 25th: 1913

Thomas Lawrence McNamara, Sr. (November 18, 1882 – July 21, 1939) was an American professional golfer.

== Early life ==
McNamara was born in Brookline, Massachusetts to an immigrant Irish family. His parents were Thomas McNamara (1841–1909) and Mariah McNamara née Curry (1851–1940).

== Professional career ==
McNamara was the head professional at Wollaston Golf Club. During the 1909 U.S. Open, McNamara became the first man ever to break 70 in a competitive American tournament. McNamara held a three-stroke lead in the 1909 U.S. Open heading to the back nine. Due to the extremely hot temperatures, McNamara suffered a heatstroke on the 14th hole. After doctors treated him, he insisted on finishing the tournament. He succeeded in finishing, but his game collapsed down the stretch and finished second.

The following year, 1910, he served as the head golf professional at the Fall River Country Club in Fall River, Massachusetts. McNamara was considered one of American's best homegrown professionals during the early twentieth century. He was head professional at Siwanoy Country Club in Bronxville, New York. He proposed the idea of a national tournament to his boss, Rodman Wanamaker. McNamara was the manager of the golf department in Wanamaker's New York City department store. Thus came the PGA Championship, first played in 1916 at Siwanoy Country Club.

== Personal life ==
McNamara and his wife Mary had seven children.

McNamara died, from coronary thrombosis, at his home in Mount Vernon, New York on July 21, 1939.

== Tournament wins ==
this list may be incomplete

=== PGA Tour wins (1) ===
- 1915 Western Open

=== Other wins (6) ===
- 1912 North and South Open, Metropolitan Open
- 1913 North and South Open, Massachusetts Open
- 1914 Philadelphia Open Championship
- 1915 Philadelphia Open Championship

== Results in major championships ==
Tournament	1903	1904	1905	1906	1907	1908	1909	1910	1911	1912	1913	1914	1915	1916	1917	1918	1919	1920	1921	1922
U.S. Open	39	CUT	T20		14	T10	2	T5	T29	2	T16	T13	2	T15	NT	NT	T3			
The Open Championship											25		NT	NT	NT	NT	NT			
PGA Championship	NYF													R32	NT	NT	R16			R64

Note: The Masters Tournament was not founded until 1934.

Top 10
Did not play

NYF = tournament not yet founded
NT = no tournament
CUT = missed the half-way cut
R64, R32, R16 = round in which player lost in PGA Championship match play
"T" indicates a tie for a place

== Team appearances ==
- France–United States Professional Match (representing the United States): 1913
