= Fred Mackenzie =

Scottish golfer (1880–1938)

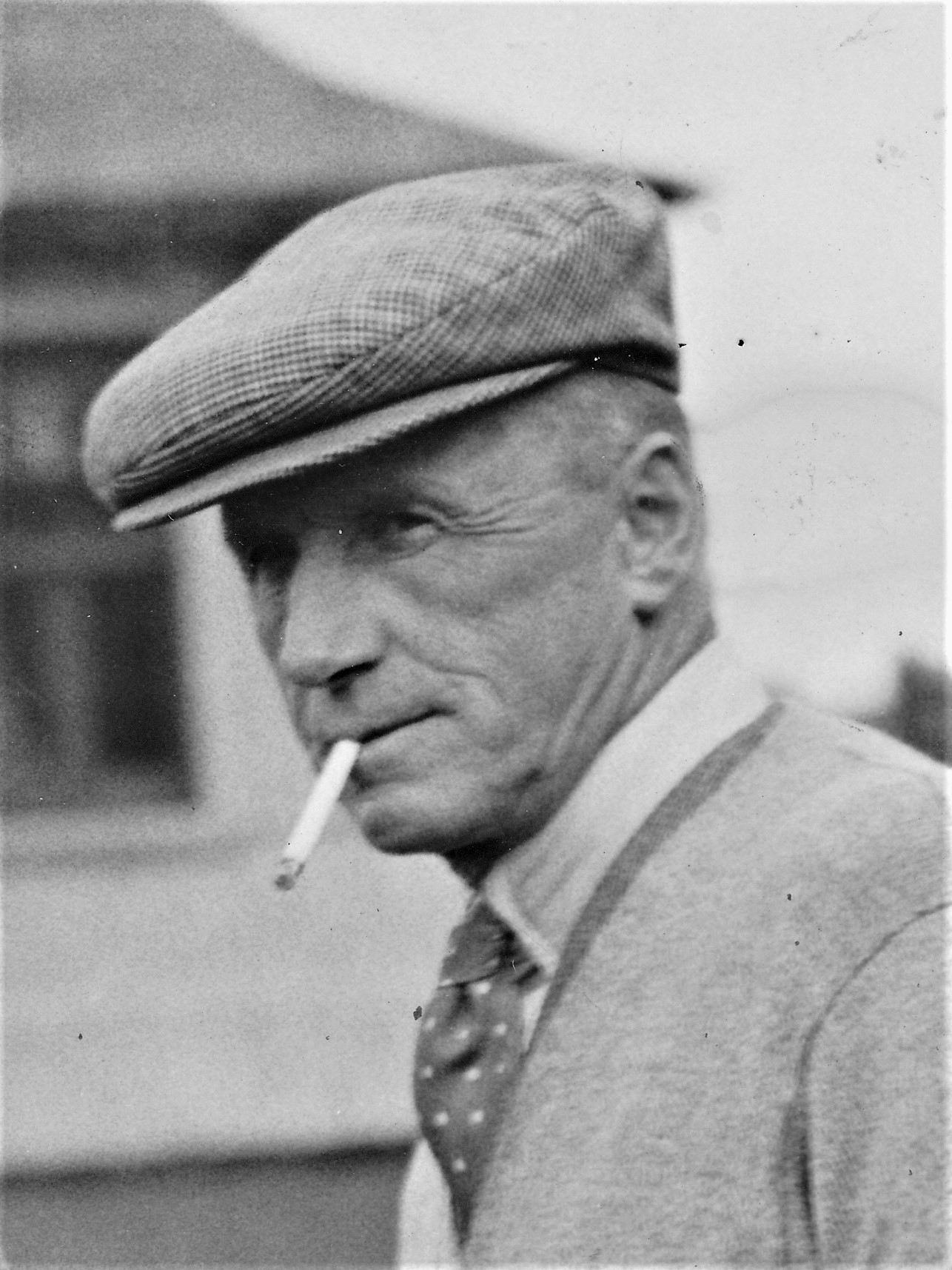

Personal information
- Full name: Frederick Mackenzie
- Nationality: Scotland
- Born: 14 February 1880 St Andrews, Scotland
- Died: 26 March 1938 (aged 58) St Andrews, Scotland

Career
- Sport: Golf
- Status: Professional

Best results in major championships
- Masters Tournament: DNP
- PGA Championship: DNP
- U.S. Open: 3rd: 1904
- The Open Championship: T16: 1910

Frederick Mackenzie (14 February 1880 – 26 March 1938) was a Scottish golfer of the early 20th century. He had a successful amateur career, winning the Dundee Evening Telegraph Cup three times between 1899 and 1903. He then had a brief spell as a professional in America, during which time he finished third in the 1904 U.S. Open. On his return to Scotland he gave up professional golf but was unable to get reinstated as an amateur. He played local competitions but was ineligible for the more important amateur tournaments.

== Early life ==
Mackenzie was born on 14 February 1880 in St Andrews, Scotland.

== Amateur career ==
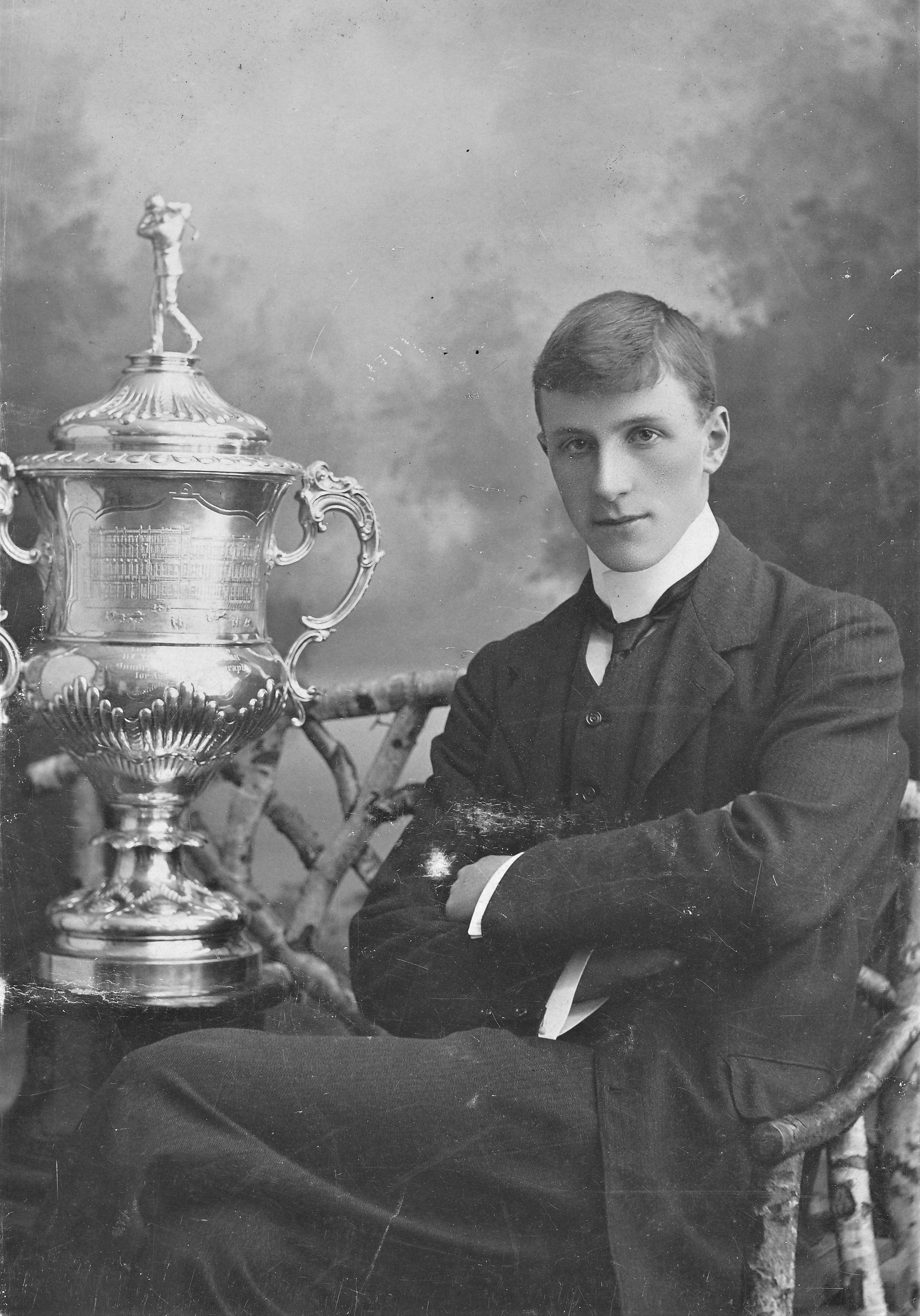
Telegraph Cup

Mackenzie had a very successful amateur career winning the Dundee Evening Telegraph Cup, the unofficial Scottish Amateur Championship, three times, in 1899, 1901 and 1903.

The first win was at Gailes where he beat W Reid from Irvine 3&1 in the final.

His second win at Carnoustie came against James Maiden, Mackenzie winning 5&3.

His third win was at Monifieth, where he met D Robertson from Carnoustie in the final. Mackenzie won the final hole to halved the match. In the 3-hole playoff, Mackenzie won the third hole to level the match again. The match then became sudden-death and, holing a long putt, Mackenzie won at the 22nd hole.

Mackenzie played for Scotland in the England–Scotland Amateur Match in 1902 and 1903.

== Professional career ==
Mackenzie had a brief spell as professional at the Onwentsia Club in Lake Forest, Illinois. During his time there he played in the U.S. Open in 1904 and 1905, finishing 3rd and tied for 16th.

The 1904 U.S. Open was held 8–9 July 1904, at Glen View Club in Golf, Illinois. Willie Anderson won his second consecutive, and third overall, U.S. Open title by five strokes over Gilbert Nicholls. Mackenzie finished in third place, shooting rounds of 76-79-74-80=309, and emulated the feat of his uncle, A W Smith, in the same competition in 1886 and 1887. Defending champion Willie Anderson shared the lead with Stewart Gardner at the end of the first round. He fell two behind Gardner, however, after the second. In the third round, Mackenzie shot a 74 to take a two-shot lead over Anderson and Gardner heading to the last. Mackenzie and Gardner fell back during the final round, with Mackenzie shooting an 80 to finish in third and Gardner carding 85 to fall to sixth. Anderson, however, posted a 72, the lowest round in U.S. Open history. His 303 total also established a new tournament record. Nicholls posted a 73 in the final round to finish in second place.

== Later career ==
Mackenzie returned to St Andrews in 1905 where he continued to play in local club competitions. However, his attempts to be reinstated as an amateur were refused and he could no longer play in the more important amateur events.

He played in the 1910 Open Championship at St Andrews where he scored 78,80,75,80=313 to tie for 16th place with Harry Vardon.

Mackenzie entered the 1927 Open Championship at St Andrews. He had rounds of 78 and 76 to qualify comfortably. In the championship itself he had rounds of 75 and 80 and missing the cut by a stroke.

== Death ==
Mackenzie died in St Andrews on 26 March 1938.

== Results in major championships ==
Tournament	1899	1900	1901	1902	1903	1904	1905	1906	1907	1908	1909
The Amateur Championship	R64		R16	R64	R16	–	–	–	–	–	–
The Open Championship		T22		WD							
U.S. Open						3	T16				

Tournament	1910	1911	1912	1913	1914	1915	1916	1917	1918	1919
The Open Championship	T16					NT	NT	NT	NT	NT
U.S. Open								NT	NT	

Tournament	1920	1921	1922	1923	1924	1925	1926	1927
The Open Championship								CUT
U.S. Open								

Note: Mackenzie only played in the Open Championship, the Amateur Championship, and the U.S. Open.

Top 10
Did not play

NT = No tournament
WD = Withdrew
CUT = missed the half-way cut
"T" indicates a tie for a place
R256, R128, R64, R32, R16, QF, SF = Round in which player lost in match play

== Team appearances ==
Amateur

- England–Scotland Amateur Match (representing Scotland): 1902 (winners), 1903
