= 1911 U.S. Open (golf) =

Coordinates: 41.849°N 88.115°W

Tournament information
- Dates: June 23–26, 1911
- Location: Wheaton, Illinois
- Course: Chicago Golf Club
- Organized by: USGA
- Format: Stroke play − 72 holes

Statistics
- Par: 76
- Length: 6,606 yards (6,041 m)
- Field: 72, 60 after cut
- Cut: 168 (+16)
- Winner's share: $300

Champion
- (United States) John McDermott
- 307 (+3), playoff

Location in the United States
Location in Illinois

The 1911 U.S. Open was the 17th U.S. Open, held June 23–26 at Chicago Golf Club in Wheaton, Illinois, a suburb west of Chicago. Nineteen-year-old John McDermott became the first American-born champion by defeating Mike Brady and George Simpson in an 18-hole playoff.

Two past champions, Alec Ross and Fred McLeod, shared the 36-hole lead on Friday evening at 149 (−3), with McDermott, Brady, and Simpson four shots back at 153, in a five-way tie for fourth.

Ross struggled on a rainy Saturday with 81-82 for 312 (+8) and fell into a tie for ninth. McLeod had a three-stroke lead after 54 holes, but finished with 83 for 308. Simpson posted 79-75 for 307, while Brady tied Simpson with a final round 75. McDermott made a birdie on the final hole for 79 to join Simpson and Brady, forcing a three-way playoff. Sunday was an idle day.

In the playoff on Monday afternoon, McDermott led Brady by four after the turn, with Simpson one more back. Brady then played the next four holes in one-under par while McDermott made three consecutive bogeys, evening up the contest with four holes remaining. McDermott took the lead at the 15th after Brady missed a four-footer (1.2 m) for par, then sealed the championship with an approach to the par-5 18th that settled ten feet (3 m) from the hole. He two-putted for birdie and 80, two strokes ahead of Brady and five clear of Simpson at 85.

At 19, McDermott became the youngest U.S. Open champion, a mark that still stands, and was also its first American-born champion. He successfully defended his title the following year, but by 1914 he began suffering from mental illness and his career was essentially over at age 23.

The Open Championship in England was held June 26−30 at Sandwich.

This was the first U.S. Open since the death of four-time champion Willie Anderson (1901, 1903, 1904, 1905); he had played in the previous fourteen editions and died the previous October at age 31.

== Course ==
Hole	Yards	Par	Hole	Yards	Par
1	468	5	10	241	4
2	358	4	11	510	5
3	337	4	12	330	4
4	418	4	13	519	5
5	334	4	14	300	4
6	568	5	15	364	4
7	310	4	16	318	4
8	315	4	17	348	4
9	141	3	18	427	5
Out	3,249	37	In	3,357	39
Source:			Total	6,606	76

== Round summaries ==
=== First round ===
Friday, June 23, 1911 (morning)

Place	Player	Score	To par
T1	(England) Herbert Barker	75	−1
T1	(Scotland) Alec Ross	75	−1
T3	(United States) Mike Brady	76	E
T3	(England) George Sargent	76	E
T3	(Scotland) George Simpson	76	E
T6	(Scotland) Fred McLeod	77	+1
T6	(United States) Tom McNamara	77	+1
T6	(United States) Harry Turple	77	+1
T9	(Scotland) James Donaldson	78	+2
T9	(United States) Otto Hackbarth	78	+2
T9	(United States) Albert Seckel (a)	78	+2
T9	(Scotland) Alex Smith	78	+2

=== Second round ===
Friday, June 23, 1911 (afternoon)

Place	Player	Score	To par
T1	(Scotland) Fred McLeod	77-72=149	−3
T1	(Scotland) Alec Ross	74-75=149	−3
3	(United States) Otto Hackbarth	78-74=152	E
T4	(United States) Mike Brady	76-77=153	+1
T4	(United States) John McDermott	81-72=153	+1
T4	(England) George Sargent	76-77=153	+1
T4	(Scotland) George Simpson	76-77=153	+1
T4	(United States) Harry Turpie	77-76=153	+1
T9	(England) Gilbert Nicholls	76-78=154	+2
T9	(Scotland) Alex Smith	78-76=154	+2

=== Third round ===
Saturday, June 24, 1911 (morning)

Place	Player	Score	To par
1	(Scotland) Fred McLeod	77-72-76=225	−3
T2	(United States) John McDermott	81-72-75=228	E
T2	(England) Gilbert Nicholls	76-78-74=228	E
T4	(Scotland) Alex Campbell	81-77-72=230	+2
T4	(Scotland) Jock Hutchison	80-77-73=230	+2
T4	(Scotland) Alec Ross	74-75-81=230	+2
T7	(United States) Mike Brady	76-77-79=232	+4
T7	(Scotland) George Simpson	76-77-79=232	+4
T9	(England) Herbert Barker	75-81-77=233	+5
T9	(Scotland) Peter Robertson	79-76-78=233	+5

=== Final round ===
Saturday, June 24, 1911 (afternoon)

Place	Player	Score	To par	Money ($)
T1	(United States) John McDermott	81-72-75-79=307	+3	Playoff
T1	(United States) Mike Brady	76-77-79-75=307	+3	Playoff
T1	(Scotland) George Simpson	76-77-79-75=307	+3	Playoff
4	(Scotland) Fred McLeod	77-72-76-83=308	+4	80
T5	(Scotland) Jock Hutchison	80-77-73-79=309	+5	65
T5	(England) Gilbert Nicholls	76-78-74-81=309	+5	65
T7	(England) Herbert Barker	75-81-77-78=311	+7	45
T7	(England) George Sargent	76-77-84-74=311	+7	45
T9	(Scotland) Peter Robertson	79-76-78-79=312	+8	25
T9	(Scotland) Alec Ross	74-75-81-82=312	+8	25

Amateurs: Seckel (+9), Sawyer (+15), Phelps (+16), Gardner (+17), Egan (+17), Watson (+17),
Ames (+22), Sellers (+31), Devol (+37).

=== Playoff ===
Monday, June 26, 1911

Place	Player	Score	To par	Money ($)
1	(United States) John McDermott	39-41=80	+4	300
2	(United States) Mike Brady	43-39=82	+6	150
3	(Scotland) George Simpson	44-41=85	+9	100

==== Scorecard ====
Hole	1	2	3	4	5	6	7	8	9	10	11	12	13	14	15	16	17	18
Par	5	4	4	4	4	5	4	4	3	4	5	4	5	4	4	4	4	5
(United States) McDermott	+1	+1	+2	+2	+2	+2	+2	+2	+2	+2	+3	+4	+4	+5	+5	+5	+5	+4
(United States) Brady	−1	+1	+2	+2	+3	+4	+5	+5	+6	+5	+5	+4	+5	+5	+6	+6	+6	+6
(Scotland) Simpson	E	+1	+3	+4	+5	+6	+6	+6	+7	+8	+7	+7	+8	+8	+9	+10	+10	+10

Birdie	Bogey	Double bogey
