= 1906 U.S. Open (golf) =

Coordinates: 42.243°N 87.844°W

Tournament information
- Dates: June 28–29, 1906
- Location: Lake Forest, Illinois
- Course: Onwentsia Club
- Organized by: USGA
- Format: Stroke play − 72 holes

Statistics
- Length: 6,107 yards (5,584 m)
- Field: 66, 55 after cut
- Cut: 171
- Winner's share: $300

Champion
- (Scotland) Alex Smith
- 295

Location in the United States
Location in Illinois

The 1906 U.S. Open was the twelfth U.S. Open, held June 28–29 at Onwentsia Club in Lake Forest, Illinois, a suburb north of Chicago. Alex Smith won the first of his two U.S. Open titles, seven strokes ahead of runner-up Willie Smith, his younger brother and the 1899 champion.

Willie Anderson, three-time defending champion and club pro at Onwentsia, was the heavy favorite. He trailed Alex Smith by two strokes after the first 36 holes on Thursday, and by three after the third round on Friday morning, but an 84 that afternoon dropped him to a distant fifth. Smith posted rounds of 73-74-73-75 for 295, a U.S. Open record and the first sub-300 winning score. Not only did his brother Willie finish in second, his brother-in-law James Maiden tied for third.

Smith's win marked the end of a streak where Scottish-born players won seven consecutive major championships.

For the first time, no player from the inaugural U.S. Open in 1895 participated. Horace Rawlins, the first champion, had played in every edition until this year.

== Round summaries ==
=== First round ===
Thursday, June 28, 1906 (morning)

| Place | Player | Score |
|---|---|---|
| T1 | (Scotland) Willie Anderson | 73 |
| T1 | (Scotland) Alex Smith | 73 |
| T1 | (Scotland) Willie Smith | 73 |
| 4 | (Scotland) Jack Hobens | 75 |
| T5 | (Scotland) Laurie Auchterlonie | 76 |
| T5 | (Scotland) Alex Campbell | 76 |
| T5 | (England) Gilbert Nicholls | 76 |
| T5 | (Scotland) Alex Ross | 76 |
| T5 | James Watson | 76 |
| T10 | (United States) Walter Fovargue | 77 |
| T10 | (United States) William "Bim" Lovekin | 77 |

=== Second round ===
Thursday, June 28, 1906 (afternoon)

| Place | Player | Score |
|---|---|---|
| 1 | (Scotland) Alex Smith | 73-74=147 |
| 2 | (Scotland) Willie Anderson | 73-76=149 |
| 3 | (Scotland) James Maiden | 80-73=153 |
| T4 | (Scotland) Laurie Auchterlonie | 76-78=154 |
| T4 | (Scotland) Willie Smith | 73-81=154 |
| T6 | (Scotland) George Cumming | 79-76=155 |
| T6 | (Scotland) Alex Ross | 76-79=155 |
| T6 | George Smith | 79-76=155 |
| T9 | Fred Brand | 78-78=156 |
| T9 | (Scotland) Stewart Gardner | 80-76=156 |
| T9 | (England) Bernard Nicholls | 79-77=156 |

=== Third round ===
Friday, June 29, 1906 (morning)

| Place | Player | Score |
|---|---|---|
| 1 | (Scotland) Alex Smith | 73-74-73=220 |
| 2 | (Scotland) Willie Anderson | 73-76-74=223 |
| 3 | (Scotland) Willie Smith | 73-81-74=228 |
| 4 | (Scotland) Laurie Auchterlonie | 76-78-75=229 |
| T5 | (Scotland) James Maiden | 80-73-77=230 |
| T5 | (Scotland) Alex Ross | 76-79-75=230 |
| T7 | (United States) Chandler Egan (a) | 79-78-76=233 |
| T7 | (Scotland) Stewart Gardner | 80-76-77=233 |
| 9 | (England) Gilbert Nicholls | 76-81-77=234 |
| 10 | (Scotland) Jack Hobens | 75-84-76=235 |

=== Final round ===
Friday, June 29, 1906 (afternoon)

| Place | Player | Score | Money ($) |
|---|---|---|---|
| 1 | (Scotland) Alex Smith | 73-74-73-75=295 | 300 |
| 2 | (Scotland) Willie Smith | 73-81-74-74=302 | 150 |
| T3 | (Scotland) Laurie Auchterlonie | 76-78-75-76=305 | 90 |
| T3 | (Scotland) James Maiden | 80-73-77-75=305 | 90 |
| 5 | (Scotland) Willie Anderson | 73-76-74-84=307 | 70 |
| 6 | (Scotland) Alex Ross | 76-79-75-80=310 | 60 |
| 7 | (Scotland) Stewart Gardner | 80-76-77-78=311 | 50 |
| T8 | (United States) Chandler Egan (a) | 79-78-76-80=313 | 0 |
| T8 | (England) Gilbert Nicholls | 76-81-77-79=313 | 40 |
| 10 | (Scotland) Jack Hobens | 75-84-76-79=314 | 30 |

Amateurs: Egan (313), Wood (327), Hunter (332), Sellers (337), Potter (342).
