= Bobby Simpson (golfer) =

Scottish golfer

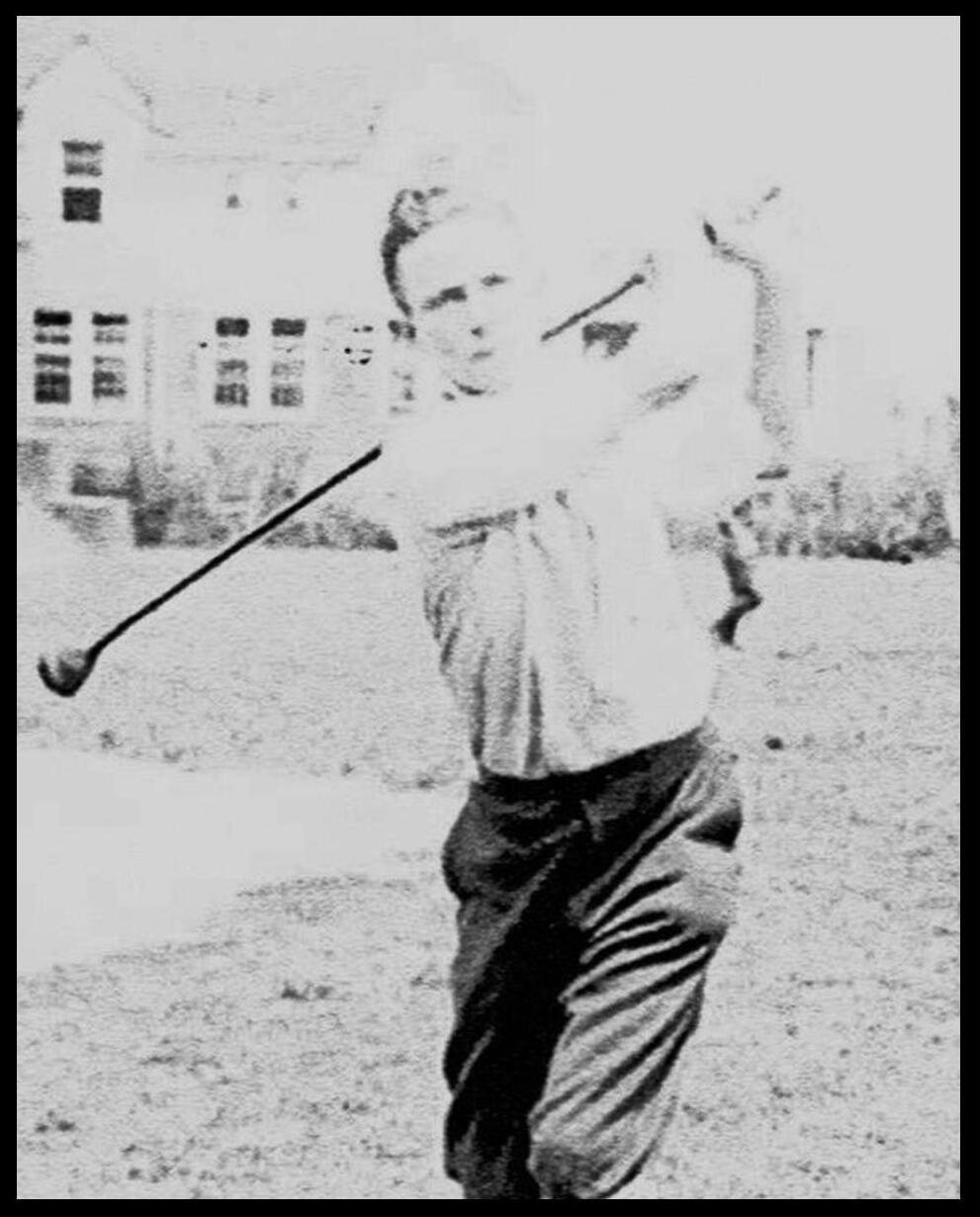
- Simpson in c.1910

Personal information
- Full name: Robert S. Simpson
- Nationality: Scotland
- Born: Scotland, U.K.
- Spouse: Fannie E. Steinkopf (m. 1911)

Career
- Sport: Golf
- Status: Professional
- Professional wins: 2

Best results in major championships
- U.S. Open: T6: 1904

Robert S. Simpson was a Scottish professional golfer who achieved success in winning two Western Opens in 1907 and 1911, as well as finishing fourth in the U.S. Open in 1904. Simpson was from Carnoustie, Scotland. He apprenticed under Robert Simpson, a Scottish golf club-maker and golf course architect, who was also from Carnoustie and part of a famous golf family of six brothers. The two Simpsons however were not related. Bobby Simpson did apprentice in Scotland as a club-maker under the other Robert Simpson prior to leaving for the United States to become a golf professional.

== Professional career ==
Simpson was part of the "Scottish Invasion" of golf professional of the late 1890s and 1900s. He secured positions at multiple courses in the Midwest including The Country Club of Oconomowoc, Hinsdale Country Club (Chicago, Illinois), Kent Country Club (Grand Rapids, Michigan), Memphis Country Club (Memphis, Tennessee), Kenosha Country Club (Kenosha, Wisconsin), Blue Mound Country Club (Wauwatosa, Wisconsin), Omaha Country Club (Omaha, Nebraska) and many years at Riverside Country Club (Chicago, Illinois). Many of the early golf professionals from Scotland earned an income in various ways as greenskeepers, part-time course architects, club-makers, teaching professionals, tournament players and exhibition golf players. His most notable victories came with victories in the Western Open in 1907 and 1911.

=== 1900 U.S. Open ===
At the 1900 U.S. Open held at the Chicago Golf Club in Wheaton, Illinois, Simpson carded rounds of 84-84-88-87 for a total of 343 and tied for 14th place.

=== 1901 U.S. Open ===
At the 1901 U.S. Open held at the Myopia Hunt Club in South Hamilton, Massachusetts, Simpson carded rounds of 88-87-87-87 for a total of 349 and again tied for 14th place.

=== 1904 U.S. Open ===
The 1904 U.S. Open was held July 8–9, 1904, at the Glen View Club in Golf, Illinois. Scottish professional Willie Anderson won his second consecutive, and third overall, U.S. Open title by five strokes over Englishman, Gilbert Nicholls. Simpson carded rounds of 82-82-76-76 for a total of 316 and finished tied in sixth place with Stewart Gardner and Percy Barrett. He won $53 in prize money.

=== 1907 Western Open ===
Simpson won the 1907 Western Open at the Hinsdale Country Club in Clarendon Hills, Illinois, where he defeated fellow Scotsmen, Willie Anderson and Fred McLeod, by two strokes, in Match Play.

=== 1908 Western Open ===
At the 1908 Western Open at the Beverly Country Club Simpson finished third (153) behind Willie Anderson (152) and Stewart Gardner (151), with the lowest round of the tournament (73).

=== 1909 U.S. Open ===
At the 1909 U.S. Open held at the Englewood Golf Club in Englewood, New Jersey, Simpson carded rounds of 84-76-77-84 for a total of 321 and tied for 46th place.

=== 1911 Western Open ===
In 1911 Simpson won his second Western Open at the Kent Country Club, in Grand Rapids, Michigan. He defeated Thomas McNamara, two up and one to play.
