= 1904 U.S. Open (golf) =

Coordinates: 42.060°N 87.781°W

Tournament information
- Dates: July 8–9, 1904
- Location: Golf, Illinois
- Course: Glen View Club
- Organized by: USGA
- Format: Stroke play − 72 holes

Statistics
- Length: 6,266 yards (5,730 m)
- Field: 69, 47 after cut
- Cut: 174
- Winner's share: $200

Champion
- (Scotland) Willie Anderson
- 303

Location in the United States
Location in Illinois

The 1904 U.S. Open was the tenth U.S. Open, held July 8–9 at Glen View Club in Golf, Illinois, a suburb northwest of Chicago. Defending champion Willie Anderson won the third of his four U.S. Open titles, five strokes ahead of runner-up Gilbert Nicholls.

Anderson shared the lead with Stewart Gardner at 75 on Friday morning, but a 78 in the afternoon dropped him two behind after 36 holes. In the third round on Saturday morning, Fred Mackenzie shot 74 to take a two-stroke lead over Anderson and Gardner after 54 holes. Mackenzie and Gardner fell back in the afternoon; Mackenzie's 80 took him down to third and Gardner's 85 dropped him to sixth. Anderson had 72 for the lowest round in U.S. Open history, and his 303 also established a new championship low. Nicholls posted a 73 in the final round to finish ascend the leaderboard to second place.

Anderson was the first to successfully defend a U.S. Open title, and he would become the first to win three straight the following year, yet to be equaled.

For the first time, the U.S. Open adopted a cut after 36 holes, eliminating those more than fifteen shots behind tenth place.

== Round summaries ==
=== First round ===
Friday, July 8, 1904 (morning)

Place	Player	Score
T1	(Scotland) Willie Anderson	75
T1	(Scotland) Stewart Gardner	75
3	(Scotland) Fred Mackenzie	76
4	(Scotland) Jack Hobens	77
T5	(England) Percy Barrett	78
T5	(Scotland) Alex Smith	78
T5	George Thomson	78
T8	(Scotland) David Foulis	79
T8	(England) Horace Rawlins	79
T10	(Scotland) Laurie Auchterlonie	80
T10	John Campbell	80
T10	(England) Bernard Nicholls	80
T10	(England) Gilbert Nicholls	80
T10	(Scotland) Donald Ross	80

=== Second round ===
Friday, July 8, 1904 (afternoon)

Place	Player	Score
1	(Scotland) Stewart Gardner	75-76=151
2	(Scotland) Willie Anderson	75-78=153
T3	(Scotland) Fred Mackenzie	76-79=155
T3	(England) Horace Rawlins	79-76=155
5	(England) Gilbert Nicholls	80-76=156
T6	(England) Percy Barrett	78-79=157
T6	(Scotland) James Foulis	83-74=157
T6	(England) Bernard Nicholls	80-77=157
T9	(Scotland) Jack Hobens	77-82=159
T9	(Scotland) Alex Smith	78-81=159

=== Third round ===
Saturday, July 9, 1904 (morning)

Place	Player	Score
1	(Scotland) Fred Mackenzie	76-79-74=229
T2	(Scotland) Willie Anderson	75-78-78=231
T2	(Scotland) Stewart Gardner	75-76-80=231
T4	(Scotland) James Foulis	83-74-78=235
T4	(England) Gilbert Nicholls	80-76-79=235
T6	(Scotland) Laurie Auchterlonie	80-81-75=236
T6	(England) Percy Barrett	78-79-79=236
T6	(England) Bernard Nicholls	80-77-79=236
9	(Scotland) Jack Hobens	77-82-80=239
T10	David Robertson	82-78-80=240
T10	(Scotland) Donald Ross	80-82-78=240
T10	(Scotland) Bobby Simpson	82-82-76=240

=== Final round ===
Saturday, July 9, 1904 (afternoon)

Place	Player	Score	Money ($)
1	(Scotland) Willie Anderson	75-78-78-72=303	200
2	(England) Gilbert Nicholls	80-76-79-73=308	150
3	(Scotland) Fred Mackenzie	76-79-74-80=309	125
T4	(Scotland) Laurie Auchterlonie	80-81-75-78=314	90
T4	(England) Bernard Nicholls	80-77-79-78=314	90
T6	(England) Percy Barrett	78-79-79-80=316	53
T6	(Scotland) Stewart Gardner	75-76-80-85=316	53
T6	(Scotland) Bobby Simpson	82-82-76-76=316	53
9	(Scotland) James Foulis	83-74-78-82=317	30
10	(Scotland) Donald Ross	80-82-78-78=318	25

Amateurs: C. Egan (329), Hunter (331), Edwards (332), Phelps (348), Clingman (349), W. Egan (363)
