= Western Amateur =

Annual golf tournament in the United States

Tournament information
- Location: Chicago, Illinois (2026)
- Established: 1899
- Course: Beverly Country Club (2026)
- Format: Stroke play and Match play
- Website: thewesternamateur.com

Current champion
- (United States) Jase Summy

The Western Amateur is a leading annual golf tournament in the United States for male amateur golfers. It is organized by the Western Golf Association. The Western Amateur features an international field of top-ranked amateur golfers. It was first held in 1899, making it the third-oldest amateur golf event in the world.

== History ==
The tournament was first held at Glen View Club in Golf, Illinois. The location has varied since, with the most events held at Point O'Woods Golf & Country Club near Benton Harbor, Michigan, including a stretch from 1971 to 2008. The winner receives the George R. Thorne championship trophy and, until 2007, an exemption to play in the Western Open, the PGA Tour's annual stop at Cog Hill Golf & Country Club in Lemont, Illinois.

World Golf Hall of Fame member Chick Evans holds a record eight Western Amateur titles. Past winners also include golf greats Jack Nicklaus, Tiger Woods, Ben Crenshaw, Justin Leonard, Phil Mickelson, Curtis Strange, Hal Sutton, Francis Ouimet, Lanny Wadkins, and Tom Weiskopf.

In December 2021, the Western Amateur joined with six other tournaments to form the Elite Amateur Golf Series.

== Winners ==
Year	Winner	Score	Runner-up	Course	Location
2026	Jay Leng	5 & 4	Michael Riebe	Beverly Country Club	Chicago, Illinois
2025	Jase Summy	6 & 5	Ethan Fang	Skokie Country Club	Glencoe, Illinois
2024	Ian Gilligan	29 holes	Jack Turner	Moraine Country Club	Dayton, Ohio
2023	Kazuma Kobori	1 up	Christiaan Maas	North Shore Country Club	Glenview, Illinois
2022	Austin Greaser	1 up	Mateo Fernandez de Oliveira	Exmoor Country Club	Highland Park, Illinois
2021	Michael Thorbjornsen	4 & 3	Gordon Sargent	Glen View Club	Golf, Illinois
2020	Pierceson Coody	3 & 2	Rasmus Neergaard-Petersen	Crooked Stick Golf Club	Carmel, Indiana
2019	Garrett Rank	3 & 2	Daniel Wetterich	Point O' Woods Golf & Country Club	Benton Township, Michigan
2018	Cole Hammer	1 up	Davis Riley	Sunset Ridge Country Club	Northfield, Illinois
2017	Norman Xiong	22 holes	Doc Redman	Skokie Country Club	Glencoe, Illinois
2016	Dylan Meyer	3 & 1	Sam Horsfield	Knollwood Club	Lake Forest, Illinois
2015	Dawson Armstrong	20 holes	Aaron Wise	Rich Harvest Farms	Sugar Grove, Illinois
2014	Beau Hossler	2 up	Xander Schauffele	Beverly Country Club	Chicago, Illinois
2013	Jordan Niebrugge	3 & 2	Sean Dale	The Alotian Club	Roland, Arkansas
2012	Chris Williams	1 up	Jordan Russell	Exmoor Country Club	Highland Park, Illinois
2011	Ethan Tracy	1 up	Patrick Cantlay	North Shore Country Club	Glenview, Illinois
2010	David Chung	2 & 1	Gregor Main	Skokie Country Club	Skokie, Illinois
2009	John Hahn	3 & 2	Zach Barlow	Conway Farms Golf Club	Lake Forest, Illinois
2008	Danny Lee	4 & 2	Erik Flores	Point O' Woods Golf & Country Club	Benton Township, Michigan
2007	Jhared Hack	1 up	Alex Prugh	Point O' Woods Golf & Country Club	Benton Township, Michigan
2006	Bronson La'Cassie	2 & 1	Pablo Martín	Point O' Woods Golf & Country Club	Benton Township, Michigan
2005	Jamie Lovemark	3 & 2	Chris Wilson	Point O' Woods Golf & Country Club	Benton Township, Michigan
2004	Ryan Moore	19 holes	James Nitties	Point O' Woods Golf & Country Club	Benton Township, Michigan
2003	Chris Botsford	3 & 2	J. J. Jakovac	Point O' Woods Golf & Country Club	Benton Township, Michigan
2002	John Klauk	6 & 5	Adam Rubinson	Point O' Woods Golf & Country Club	Benton Township, Michigan
2001	Bubba Dickerson	6 & 4	Trip Kuehne	Point O' Woods Golf & Country Club	Benton Township, Michigan
2000	Michael Kirk	2 & 1	Ben Curtis	Point O' Woods Golf & Country Club	Benton Township, Michigan
1999	Steve Scott	2 & 1	Andy Miller	Point O' Woods Golf & Country Club	Benton Township, Michigan
1998	Michael Henderson	1 up	Shawn Koch	Point O' Woods Golf & Country Club	Benton Township, Michigan
1997	Danny Green	19 holes	Andy Miller	Point O' Woods Golf & Country Club	Benton Township, Michigan
1996	Joel Kribel	2 & 1	Brett Partidge	Point O' Woods Golf & Country Club	Benton Township, Michigan
1995	Patrick Lee	2 & 1	Robert Floyd	Point O' Woods Golf & Country Club	Benton Township, Michigan
1994	Tiger Woods	2 & 1	Chris Riley	Point O' Woods Golf & Country Club	Benton Township, Michigan
1993	Justin Leonard	6 & 4	Danny Green	Point O' Woods Golf & Country Club	Benton Township, Michigan
1992	Justin Leonard	2 up	David Howser	Point O' Woods Golf & Country Club	Benton Township, Michigan
1991	Phil Mickelson	2 & 1	Justin Leonard	Point O' Woods Golf & Country Club	Benton Township, Michigan
1990	Craig Kanada	4 & 2	Greg Griffin	Point O' Woods Golf & Country Club	Benton Township, Michigan
1989	David Sutherland	2 & 1	Tony Mollica	Point O' Woods Golf & Country Club	Benton Township, Michigan
1988	Chris DiMarco	1 up	Bill Lundeen	Point O' Woods Golf & Country Club	Benton Township, Michigan
1987	Hugh Royer III	3 & 2	Craig Perks	Point O' Woods Golf & Country Club	Benton Township, Michigan
1986	Greg Parker	3 & 1	Robert Huxtable	Point O' Woods Golf & Country Club	Benton Township, Michigan
1985	Scott Verplank	1 up	Dave Peege	Point O' Woods Golf & Country Club	Benton Township, Michigan
1984	John Inman	3 & 2	Rocco Mediate	Point O' Woods Golf & Country Club	Benton Township, Michigan
1983	Billy Tuten	2 up	Kent Kluba	Point O' Woods Golf & Country Club	Benton Township, Michigan
1982	Rick Fehr	5 & 3	Tommy Moore	Point O' Woods Golf & Country Club	Benton Township, Michigan
1981	Frank Fuhrer III	2 & 1	Curt Byrum	Point O' Woods Golf & Country Club	Benton Township, Michigan
1980	Hal Sutton	4 & 3	David Ogrin	Point O' Woods Golf & Country Club	Benton Township, Michigan
1979	Hal Sutton	1 up	Mike Gove	Point O' Woods Golf & Country Club	Benton Township, Michigan
1978	Bobby Clampett	2 up	Mark Wiebe	Point O' Woods Golf & Country Club	Benton Township, Michigan
1977	Jim Nelford	2 & 1	Rafael Alarcón	Point O' Woods Golf & Country Club	Benton Township, Michigan
1976	John Stark	3 & 1	Mick Soli	Point O' Woods Golf & Country Club	Benton Township, Michigan
1975	Andy Bean	1 up	Randy Simmons	Point O' Woods Golf & Country Club	Benton Township, Michigan
1974	Curtis Strange	20 holes	Jay Haas	Point O' Woods Golf & Country Club	Benton Township, Michigan
1973	Ben Crenshaw	4 & 3	Jimmy Ellis	Point O' Woods Golf & Country Club	Benton Township, Michigan
1972	Gary Sanders	1 up	Gil Morgan	Point O' Woods Golf & Country Club	Benton Township, Michigan
1971	Andy North	1 up	Barney Thompson	Point O' Woods Golf & Country Club	Benton Township, Michigan
1970	Lanny Wadkins	4 & 2	Charlie Borner	Wichita Country Club	Wichita, Kansas
1969	Steve Melnyk	3 & 1	Howard Twitty	Rockford Country Club	Rockford, Illinois
1968	Rik Massengale	3 & 1	Kemp Richardson	Grosse Ile Golf & Country Club	Grosse Ile Township, Michigan
1967	Bob E. Smith	3 & 1	Marty Fleckman	Milburn Golf & Country Club	Overland Park, Kansas
1966	Jim Wiechers	1 up	Ron Cerrudo	Pinehurst Country Club	Pinehurst, North Carolina
1965	Bob E. Smith	19 holes	George Boutell	Point O' Woods Golf & Country Club	Benton Township, Michigan
1964	Steve Oppermann	3 & 2	Ed Updegraff	Tucson Country Club	Tucson, Arizona
1963	Tom Weiskopf	5 & 4	Labron Harris Jr.	Point O' Woods Golf & Country Club	Benton Township, Michigan
1962	Art Hudnutt	1 up	Melvin Stevens	Orchard Lake Country Club	Orchard Lake, Michigan
1961	Jack Nicklaus	4 & 3	James "Billy" Key	New Orleans Country Club	New Orleans, Louisiana
1960	Tommy Aaron	Default	Bob Cochran	Northland Country Club	Duluth, Minnesota
1959	Ed Updegraff	7 & 5	Charles Hunter, Jr.	Waverley Country Club	Portland, Oregon
1958	James "Billy" Key	3 & 2	Mason Rudolph	Country Club of Florida	Golf, Florida
1957	Ed Updegraff	9 & 8	Joe Campbell	Old Warson Country Club	St. Louis, Missouri
1956	Mason Rudolph	6 & 4	Jack Parnell	Belle Meade Country Club	Nashville, Tennessee
1955	Eddie Merrins	37 holes	Hillman Robbins	Rockford Country Club	Rockford, Illinois
1954	Bruce Cudd	37 holes	Philip Getchell	Broadmoor Golf Club	Seattle, Washington
1953	Dale Morey	8 & 6	Richard Norton	Blythefield Country Club	Belmont, Michigan
1952	Frank Stranahan	3 & 2	Harvie Ward	Exmoor Country Club	Highland Park, Illinois
1951	Frank Stranahan	7 & 6	James Blair III	South Bend Country Club	South Bend, Indiana
1950	Charles Coe	7 & 6	Robert Goldwater	Dallas Country Club	Highland Park, Texas
1949	Frank Stranahan	5 & 4	Walter Cisco	Bellerive Country Club	Town and Country, Missouri
1948	Skee Riegel	3 & 1	Jim McHale Jr.	Wichita Country Club	Wichita, Kansas
1947	Bud Ward	1 up	Frank Stranahan	Wakonda Country Club	Des Moines, Iowa
1946	Frank Stranahan	1 up	Bud Ward	Northland Country Club	Duluth, Minnesota
1943–1945	No tournament due to World War II				
1942	Pat Abbott	7 & 6	Bruce McCormick	Manito Golf and Country Club	Spokane, Washington
1941	Bud Ward	3 & 2	Harry Todd	Broadmoor Golf Club	Colorado Springs, Colorado
1940	Bud Ward	3 & 1	George Victor	Minneapolis Golf Club	St. Louis Park, Minnesota
1939	Harry Todd	2 & 1	Larry Moller	Oklahoma City Country Club	Oklahoma City, Oklahoma
1938	Bob Babbish	1 up	Maurice McCarthy	South Bend Country Club	South Bend, Indiana
1937	Wilford Wehrle	1 up	Chuck Kocsis	Los Angeles Country Club	Los Angeles, California
1936	Paul Leslie	2 & 1	Bob Frazer	Happy Hollow Club	Omaha, Nebraska
1935	Charlie Yates	5 & 3	Rodney Bliss	Broadmoor Golf Club	Colorado Springs, Colorado
1934	Zell Eaton	4 & 3	Spec Goldman	Twin Hills Golf & Country Club	Oklahoma City, Oklahoma
1933	Jack Westland	3 & 2	Rodney Bliss	Memphis Country Club	Memphis, Tennessee
1932	Gus Moreland	5 & 4	Ira Couch	Rockford Country Club	Rockford, Illinois
1931	Don Moe	9 & 7	Malcolm MacNaughton	Portland Golf Club	Portland, Oregon
1930	John Lehman	4 & 2	Ira Couch	Beverly Country Club	Chicago, Illinois
1929	Don Moe	37 holes	Gilbert Carter	Mission Hills Country Club	Mission Hills, Kansas
1928	Frank Dolp	4 & 3	Gus Novotny	Bob O'Link Golf Club	Highland Park, Illinois
1927	Bon Stein	2 & 1	Eddie Held	Seattle Golf Club	Seattle, Washington
1926	Frank Dolp	6 & 5	Bon Stein	White Bear Yacht Club	White Bear Lake, Minnesota
1925	Keefe Carter	3 & 2	Russell Martin	Lochmoor Club	Detroit, Michigan
1924	Jimmy Johnston	1 up	Albert Seckel	Hinsdale Country Club	Chicago, Illinois
1923	Chick Evans	6 & 4	Hamilton Gardner	Mayfield Country Club	Cleveland, Ohio
1922	Chick Evans	5 & 4	George Von Elm	Hillcrest Country Club	Kansas City, Missouri
1921	Chick Evans	3 & 2	Rudy Knepper	Westmoreland Country Club	Wilmette, Illinois
1920	Chick Evans	5 & 4	Clarence Wolff	Memphis Country Club	Memphis, Tennessee
1919	Harry Legg	2 & 1	Richard Bockenkamp	Sunset Hill Country Club	St. Louis, Missouri
1918	No tournament due to World War I				
1917	Francis Ouimet	1 up	Ken Edwards	Midlothian Country Club	Midlothian, Illinois
1916	Heinrich Schmidt	7 & 6	Douglas Grant	Del Monte Golf and Country Club	Del Monte, California
1915	Chick Evans	7 & 6	James D. Standish, Jr.	Mayfield Country Club	Lyndhurst, Ohio
1914	Chick Evans	11 & 9	James D. Standish, Jr.	Kent Country Club	Grand Rapids, Michigan
1913	Warren Wood	4 & 3	Ned Allis	Homewood Country Club	Flossmoor, Illinois
1912	Chick Evans	1 up	Warren Wood	Denver Country Club	Denver, Colorado
1911	Albert Seckel	8 & 7	Robert Gardner	Detroit Golf Club	Detroit, Michigan
1910	Mason Phelps	2 & 1	Chick Evans	Minikahda Club	Minneapolis, Minnesota
1909	Chick Evans	1 up	Albert Seckel	Homewood Country Club	Flossmoor, Illinois
1908	Mason Phelps	6 & 5	H. W. Allen	Arsenal Golf Club	Rock Island, Illinois
1907	Chandler Egan	5 & 4	Herbert Jones	Chicago Golf Club	Wheaton, Illinois
1906	Daniel Sawyer	37 holes	Warren Wood	Glen Echo Country Club	St. Louis, Missouri
1905	Chandler Egan	3 & 2	Walter Egan	Glen View Club	Golf, Illinois
1904	Chandler Egan	6 & 5	Daniel Sawyer	Exmoor Country Club	Highland Park, Illinois
1903	Walter Egan	1 up	Chandler Egan	Euclid Golf Club	Cleveland, Ohio
1902	Chandler Egan	37 holes	Walter Egan	Chicago Golf Club	Wheaton, Illinois
1901	Phelps Hoyt	6 & 5	Bruce Smith	Midlothian Country Club	Midlothian, Illinois
1900	William Waller	1 up	William Holabird, Jr.	Onwentsia Club	Lake Forest, Illinois
1899	David Forgan	6 & 5	Walter Egan	Glen View Club	Golf, Illinois
