= Frederick Mackenzie =

Frederick Mackenzie may refer to:

== Politicians ==
- Frederick Mackenzie (Quebec politician) (1841–1889), Member of the Canadian Parliament for Montreal West
- Frederick Donald MacKenzie (1882–1970), Member of the Canadian Parliament for Neepawa

== Others ==
- Frederick Arthur MacKenzie, journalist and author
- Frederick Mackenzie (cricketer) (1849-1934), English cricketer
- Frederick Mackenzie (painter) (1788–1854), British watercolour painter and architectural draughtsman
- Fred Mackenzie, Scottish golfer
- Fred T. Mackenzie (born 1934), American sedimentary and global biogeochemist
