= 1907 U.S. Open (golf) =

Coordinates: 40.065°N 75.209°W

Tournament information
- Dates: June 20–21, 1907
- Location: Chestnut Hill, Philadelphia, Pennsylvania
- Course: Philadelphia Cricket Club
- Organized by: USGA
- Format: Stroke play − 72 holes

Statistics
- Field: 73, 51 after cut
- Cut: 169
- Winner's share: $300

Champion
- (Scotland) Alec Ross
- 302

Location in the United States
Location in Pennsylvania

The 1907 U.S. Open was the 13th U.S. Open, held June 20–21 at Philadelphia Cricket Club in Chestnut Hill, Pennsylvania, a neighborhood of northwest Philadelphia. Alec Ross posted four sub-80 rounds to win his only major title, two strokes ahead of runner-up Gilbert Nicholls.

After the first 36 holes on Thursday, Ross owned a one-shot lead over Jack Hobens, who recorded the first hole-in-one in U.S. Open history in the second round.

Hobens led Nicholls by one after the third round on Friday morning, but an 85 in the afternoon dropped him to fourth place. Ross began the round two behind Hobens and shot a 76 to prevail by two over Nicholls, who shot 79. Ross' older brother Donald, the famed golf course architect, finished tenth.

Defending champion Alex Smith opted to play in the Open Championship in England, held on the same two days at Hoylake.

== Round summaries ==
=== First round ===
Thursday, June 20, 1907 (morning)

Place	Player	Score
1	(Scotland) David Brown	75
T2	(United States) Mike Brady	76
T2	(Scotland) James Campbell	76
T2	(Scotland) Jack Hobens	76
T2	(England) Bernard Nicholls	76
T2	(Scotland) Alec Ross	76
T7	(Scotland) Laurie Auchterlonie	77
T7	David Hunter	77
T9	(Scotland) Alex Campbell	78
T9	John Campbell	78
T9	(Scotland) George Low	78

=== Second round ===
Thursday, June 20, 1907 (afternoon)

Place	Player	Score
1	(Scotland) Alec Ross	76-74=150
2	(Scotland) Jack Hobens	76-75=151
T3	(Scotland) Alex Campbell	78-74=152
T3	(England) Bernard Nicholls	76-76=152
T3	David Hunter	77-75=152
T6	(United States) Mike Brady	76-77=153
T6	(England) Gilbert Nicholls	80-73=153
T6	David Robertson	81-77=153
T9	(Scotland) Laurie Auchterlonie	77-77=154
T9	(Scotland) George Low	78-76=154

=== Third round ===
Friday, June 21, 1907 (morning)

Place	Player	Score
1	(Scotland) Jack Hobens	76-75-73=224
2	(England) Gilbert Nicholls	80-73-72=225
3	(Scotland) Alec Ross	76-74-76=226
4	(Scotland) Alex Campbell	78-74-78=230
5	Fred Brand	78-80-73=231
T6	(Scotland) David Brown	75-80-78=233
T6	(Scotland) George Low	78-76-79=233
T6	(England) Bernard Nicholls	76-76-81=233
T6	David Robertson	81-77-78=233
10	(Scotland) Donald Ross	78-80-76=234

=== Final round ===
Friday, June 21, 1907 (afternoon)

Place	Player	Score	Money ($)
1	(Scotland) Alec Ross	76-74-76-76=302	300
2	(England) Gilbert Nicholls	80-73-72-79=304	150
3	(Scotland) Alex Campbell	78-74-78-75=305	100
4	(Scotland) Jack Hobens	76-75-73-85=309	80
T5	(Scotland) George Low	78-76-79-77=310	60
T5	(Scotland) Fred McLeod	79-77-79-75=310	60
T5	(Scotland) Peter Robertson	81-77-78-74=310	60
T8	(Scotland) David Brown	75-80-78-78=311	35
T8	(England) Bernard Nicholls	76-76-81-78=311	35
10	(Scotland) Donald Ross	78-80-76-78=312	20

Amateurs: Travers (324), Smith (328), Carr (334), West (335), Forrest (338), Cocharan (346).
