= George Simpson (golfer) =

Scottish-American golfer

Personal information
- Full name: George O. Simpson
- Nationality: Scotland; United States
- Born: 1 January 1887 Monifieth, Scotland
- Died: 27 January 1920 (aged 33) Chicago, Illinois

Career
- Sport: Golf
- Turned professional: 1911

Best results in major championships
- PGA Championship: T9: 1916
- U.S. Open: 3rd: 1911
- The Open Championship: DNP

George O. Simpson (1 January 1887 – 27 January 1920) was a Scottish-American professional golfer who played in the early 20th century. Simpson had one top-10 finish in a golf major championship when he finished third in the 1911 U.S. Open. Simpson finished second in the 1910 Western Open.

== Early life ==
Simpson was born 1 January 1887 in Monifieth, Scotland. He emigrated to the United States (date unknown) to further his career as a professional golfer. He held posts as professional at Wheaton Golf Club, La Grange Country Club, and Oak Park Country Club, and Omaha Country Club (1913–1914).

== Golf career ==
=== 1911 U.S. Open ===
The 1911 U.S. Open was the 17th U.S. Open, held June 23–26 at Chicago Golf Club in Wheaton, Illinois, a suburb west of Chicago. 19-year-old John McDermott became the first American-born U.S. Open champion by defeating Mike Brady and George Simpson in an 18-hole playoff.

==== Playoff ====
In the playoff on Monday, McDermott led Brady by four after the turn, with Simpson five back. Brady then played the next four holes in 1-under par while McDermott made three consecutive bogeys, evening up the contest heading to the 15th. McDermott took the lead after Brady missed a 4-footer for par, then sealed the championship with an approach to the 18th that settled 10 feet from the hole. He two-putted from there for an 80, two ahead of Brady and five ahead of Simpson who shot a disappointing 85. He won $100 for a third-place finish in the tournament.

== Death and legacy ==
Simpson died in Chicago, Illinois, on 27 January 1920. He finished third in the 1911 U.S. Open and was a former Scottish Amateur champion before emigrating to the U.S. and turning professional in 1911. He finished second in the 1910 Western Open, losing to Chick Evans at Beverly Country Club by the score of 6 and 5.

Simpson graciously praised Evans when he said, “I’ve learned the greatest golf lesson of my life today. I consider it a greater honor to be beaten by the kind of golf you have played than to have remained out of the tournament because I did not fancy match play.”

== Results in major championships ==
Tournament	1911	1912	1913	1914	1915	1916
U.S. Open	3	T13		T13	T47	T24
PGA Championship	NYF	NYF	NYF	NYF	NYF	R16

Note: Simpson never played only in the Masters Tournament or The Open Championship.

Top 10
Did not play

NYF = Tournament not yet founded
R64, R32, R16, QF, SF = Round in which player lost in PGA Championship match play
"T" indicates a tie for a place
