= Point O' Woods =

Point O'Woods or Point O' Woods may refer to

- Point O'Woods Golf & Country Club
- Point O' Woods, New York
