= 1974 U.S. Women's Open =

Coordinates: 41.801°N 87.881°W

Tournament information
- Dates: July 18–21, 1974
- Location: La Grange, Illinois
- Course: La Grange Country Club
- Organized by: USGA
- Tour: LPGA Tour

Statistics
- Par: 72
- Cut: 155 (+11)
- Prize fund: $40,000
- Winner's share: $6,073

Champion
- (United States) Sandra Haynie
- 295 (+7)

Location in the United States
Location in Illinois

The 1974 U.S. Women's Open was the 29th U.S. Women's Open, held July 18–21 at La Grange Country Club in La Grange, Illinois, a suburb west of Chicago.

After a double bogey, Sandra Haynie sank birdie putts from 70 and 15 feet (21 and 5 m) on the final two holes to win by a stroke over runners-up Carol Mann and Beth Stone. Haynie had won the previous major, the LPGA Championship, a month earlier.

== Final leaderboard ==
Sunday, July 21, 1974

Place	Player	Score	To par	Money ($)
1	(United States) Sandra Haynie	73-73-74-75=295	+7	6,073
T2	(United States) Beth Stone	75-74-76-71=296	+8	2,573
T2	(United States) Carol Mann	72-72-77-75=296	+8	2,573
T4	(United States) JoAnne Carner	77-72-71-77=297	+9	1,623
T4	(United States) Kathy Whitworth	75-77-74-71=297	+9	1,623
6	(Canada) Sandra Post	81-72-71-74=298	+10	1,473
T7	(United States) Debbie Massey (a)	71-73-80-75=299	+11	0
T7	(United States) Donna Caponi Young	71-76-79-73=299	+11	1,373
T9	(United States) Jane Booth (a)	76-74-76-74=300	+12	0
T9	(United States) Ruth Jessen	77-71-71-81=300	+12	1,273
