= Herbert Barker (golfer) =

English golfer and golf course architect

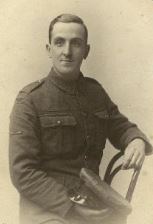
- Barker in RFC uniform, c. 1916

Personal information
- Full name: Herbert Haydn Barker
- Nationality: England
- Born: 1883 Huddersfield, England
- Died: 14 June 1924 (aged 41) Rastrick, Yorkshire, England
- Spouse: Evelyn Barker

Career
- Sport: Golf
- Turned professional: c. 1907

Best results in major championships
- Masters Tournament: DNP
- PGA Championship: DNP
- U.S. Open: T7: 1909, 1911
- The Open Championship: T31: 1907

Herbert Haydn Barker (1883 – 14 June 1924) was an English professional golfer and golf course architect who played in the early 20th century. Barker's best performance came in the 1909 U.S. Open when he tied for seventh place. He had an identical finish in the 1911 U.S. Open.

== Early life ==
Barker was born in Huddersfield, England, in 1883.

== Golf career ==
Barker had a successful amateur career, winning several tournaments in Great Britain in the early 1900s representing Huddersfield Golf Club. His wins included the Yorkshire Amateur in 1904 and 1906, the Irish Amateur Open Championship in 1906 and the Dartmouth Bowl for three consecutive years starting in 1905. He played in the Amateur Championship in 1905 and 1907 and qualified for the 1907 Open Championship. He also played for the England amateur team against Scotland in 1907. He sailed from Southampton on 21 September 1907 to take up a professional position in America.

Barker served as head professional at Garden City Golf Club in Garden City, New York, from 1908 to 1911. He found golf to be more competitive in America and failed to win any events. But he also discovered less challenging courses and soon began designing and remodelling layouts with the intention of elevating the game in the United States. After 1911 his appearances in tournaments were less frequent and he concentrated more on his work as a golf course architect.

== Golf course designer ==
Barker moved to the southern United States after leaving Garden City, and laid out Roebuck Country Club in Birmingham, Alabama, and stayed on as head professional for a time before taking a position at the Country Club of Virginia in Richmond in the fall of 1914.

== Military service ==
Barker took a two-month leave of absence from the Country Club of Virginia and sailed back to Britain on 30 July 1915 to enlist in the military, joining the Royal Flying Corps. He was stationed at South Shields, Seaton Carew, and RNAS Killingholme.

== Death ==
Although he told friends he intended to return after the war, Barker never returned to America. He died on 14 June 1924 after an extended illness. A death certificate, registered two days after his death, in the Sub-District of Brighouse in the County of York, WR, states that he died of "1) Myocarditis-6 months and 2) Auricular Fibrillation-2 months" and also had "Rheumatism 18 years ago". The death, which occurred at 23 Clough Lane, Brighouse, was in the presence of his wife, Evelyn Barker. The certificate listed Barker's date of death as 14 June 1924, his age as 41 and his occupation as "Timber Merchant", and was certified by A. Latimer Walker MB.

== Courses designed ==
The following is a partial list of courses designed by Herbert Barker:

- OD denotes courses for which Barker is the original designer
- R denotes courses reconstructed by Barker
- A denotes courses for which Barker made substantial additions
- E denotes courses that Barker examined and on the construction of which he consulted

Name	Contribution	Year built	City / Town	State / Province	Country	Comments
Don Hawkins Municipal GC	OD	1914	Birmingham	Alabama	United States	Public, formerly Roebuck CC
Capital City CC	OD	1911	Atlanta	Georgia	United States	Private
Druid Hills CC	OD	1912	Atlanta	Georgia	United States	Private
Columbia CC	OD	1911	Chevy Chase	Maryland	United States	Private
Arcola CC	OD	1909	Paramus	New Jersey	United States	Private
Raritan Valley CC	OD	1911	Bridgewater	New Jersey	United States	Private
Rumson CC	OD	1910	Rumson	New Jersey	United States	Private
Grove Park Inn CC	OD	1911	Asheville	North Carolina	United States	Private
Mayfield CC	OD	1911	Cleveland	Ohio	United States	Private, with Bert Way
The Springhaven Club	OD	1904	Wallingford	Pennsylvania	United States	Ida Dixon design (1904), alterations by Barker (1910)
CC of Virginia (Westhampton Course)	OD	1908	Richmond	Virginia	United States	Private

== Results in major championships ==
Tournament	1905	1906	1907	1908	1909	1910	1911	1912	1913	1914	1915
The Amateur Championship	R128		R32	–	–	–	–	–	–	–	–
Open Championship			T31								
U.S. Open				T17	T7	T8	T7	?	T36	?	T24

Note: Barker only played in the Amateur Championship, the Open Championship and the U.S. Open.

Top 10
Did not play

? = finish unknown
"T" indicates a tie for a place
R256, R128, R64, R32, R16, QF, SF = Round in which player lost in match play

== Team appearances ==
Amateur

- England–Scotland Amateur Match (representing England): 1907

== Notes ==
^{†} Remodelled by A. W. Tillinghast (1935) and Bob Cupp (2003)
