= H. Chandler and Alice B. Egan House =

Historic house in Oregon, United States

- U.S. National Register of Historic Places
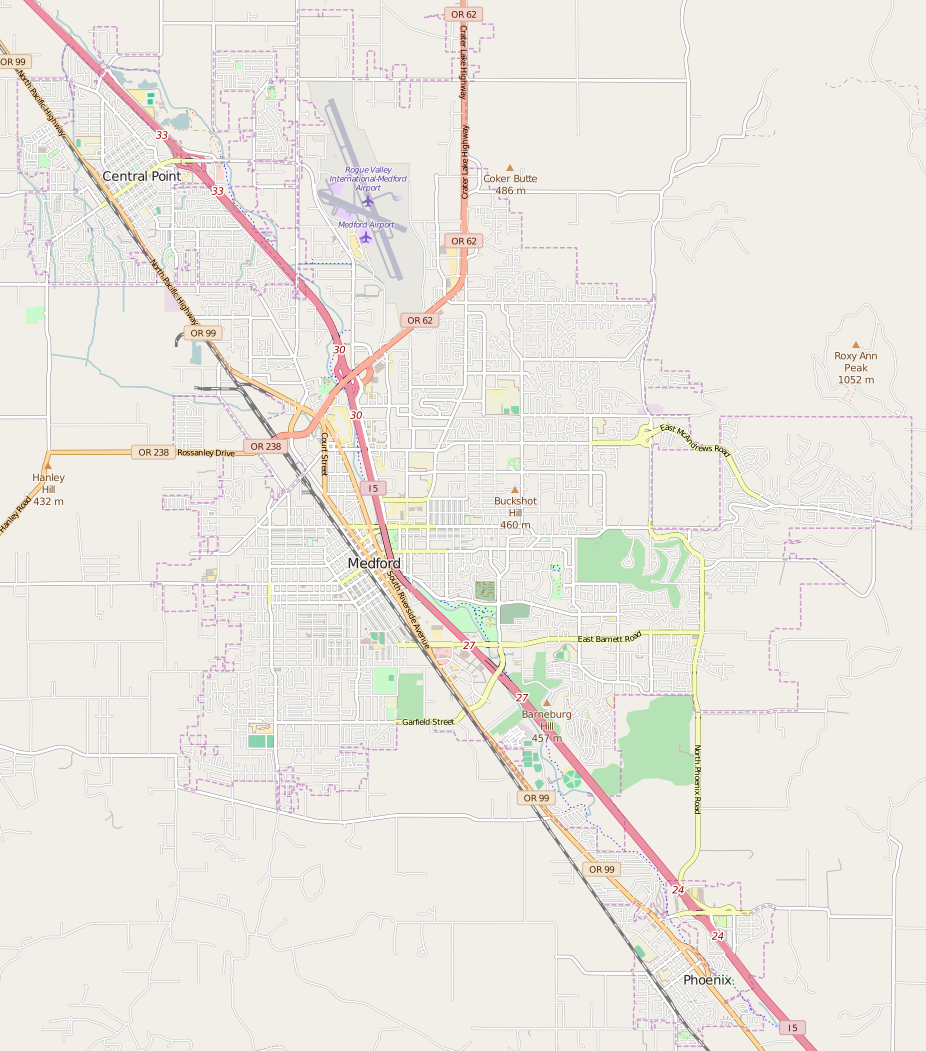
- Location within Medford OR Location within Oregon
- Location: 2620 Foothill Road; Medford, Oregon
- Coordinates: 42°21′11″N 122°49′21″W
- Area: 7.95 acres (3.22 ha)
- Built: 1911
- Architect: H. Chandler Egan (attributed)
- Architectural style: Arts and Crafts
- Restored: 1985
- NRHP reference No.: 97000126
- Added to NRHP: February 21, 1997

The H. Chandler and Alice B. Egan House is a historic house in Medford, Oregon, United States. Champion golfer and noted golf course architect Chandler Egan (1884–1936) designed it in the Arts and Crafts style soon after he relocated from Chicago to Medford where he explored his interest in farming. His involvement in golf course design grew naturally out of the fact that he was one of the few golf experts in the Pacific Northwest in that period. Through his personal celebrity and the spread of new courses, he played a pivotal role in the development of golf in Oregon and the region. Built in 1911 during Medford's "Orchard Boom", the house served both as family residence and headquarters for the surrounding Egan orchard venture. It subsequently underwent several stages of development and alteration during the Egan residency.

The house was added to the National Register of Historic Places in 1997.

== See also ==
- National Register of Historic Places listings in Jackson County, Oregon
