= Ida Dixon =

American golf course architect (1854–1916)

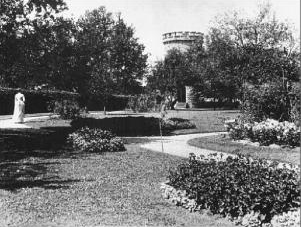
- Dixon (left) in 1890 strolling on the south lawn of The Gables Mansion
- Born: Ida Elizabeth Gilbert; December 25, 1854; Philadelphia, Pennsylvania, U.S.
- Died: November 22, 1916 (aged 61); Wallingford, Pennsylvania, U.S.
- Resting place: Laurel Hill Cemetery, Philadelphia, Pennsylvania

Ida Elizabeth Dixon (December 25, 1854 – November 22, 1916) was an American socialite and golf course architect from Pennsylvania. She was the first female golf course architect in the United States and perhaps in the world. She designed the Springhaven Country Club golf course in Wallingford, Pennsylvania in 1904.

== Early life ==
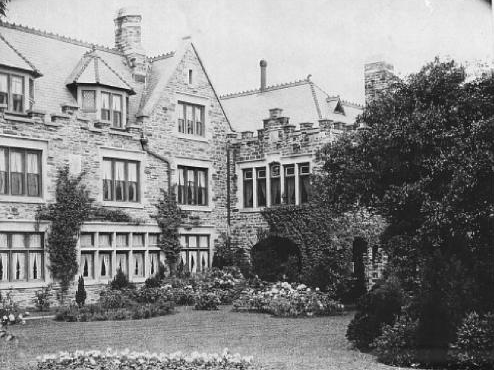
The Gables Mansion in 1896, home of Henry P. Dixon and Ida E. Dixon

Ida Elizabeth Gilbert was born in Philadelphia, Pennsylvania, on December 25, 1854. She was married to the Quaker businessman and Pennsylvania Railroad executive Henry P. Dixon. In addition to his position at the railroad, Henry Dixon was also the owner of the Henry P. Dixon Company, a manufacturer of grates, fireplaces, and furnaces, and was a dealer in tiles for hearths, halls, and mantel facades. The couple resided part-time in a large mansion called "The Gables" in Wallingford which was designed and custom built by architect Theophilus P. Chandler Jr. in 1889 as a summer home.

== Designing Springhaven Club ==
In 1904, Dixon designed an 18-hole golf course for the Springhaven Club, where she and her husband were enthusiastic golfers. They both served on the Club's governing committee. Co-authors Geoffrey S. Cornish and Ronald E. Whitten, in their book The Architects of Golf, credit Dixon as the first female golf architect in America and perhaps in the world. In addition to her golf course design work, she served as president of the Women's Golf Association of Philadelphia from 1911–16.

=== Course redesign ===
In 1910, changes were made to the course by Horace Rawlins and Herbert Barker. Today the course plays 6,518 yards at par 70 from the back tees with a course rating of 71.1 and a slope rating of 130.

== Death ==
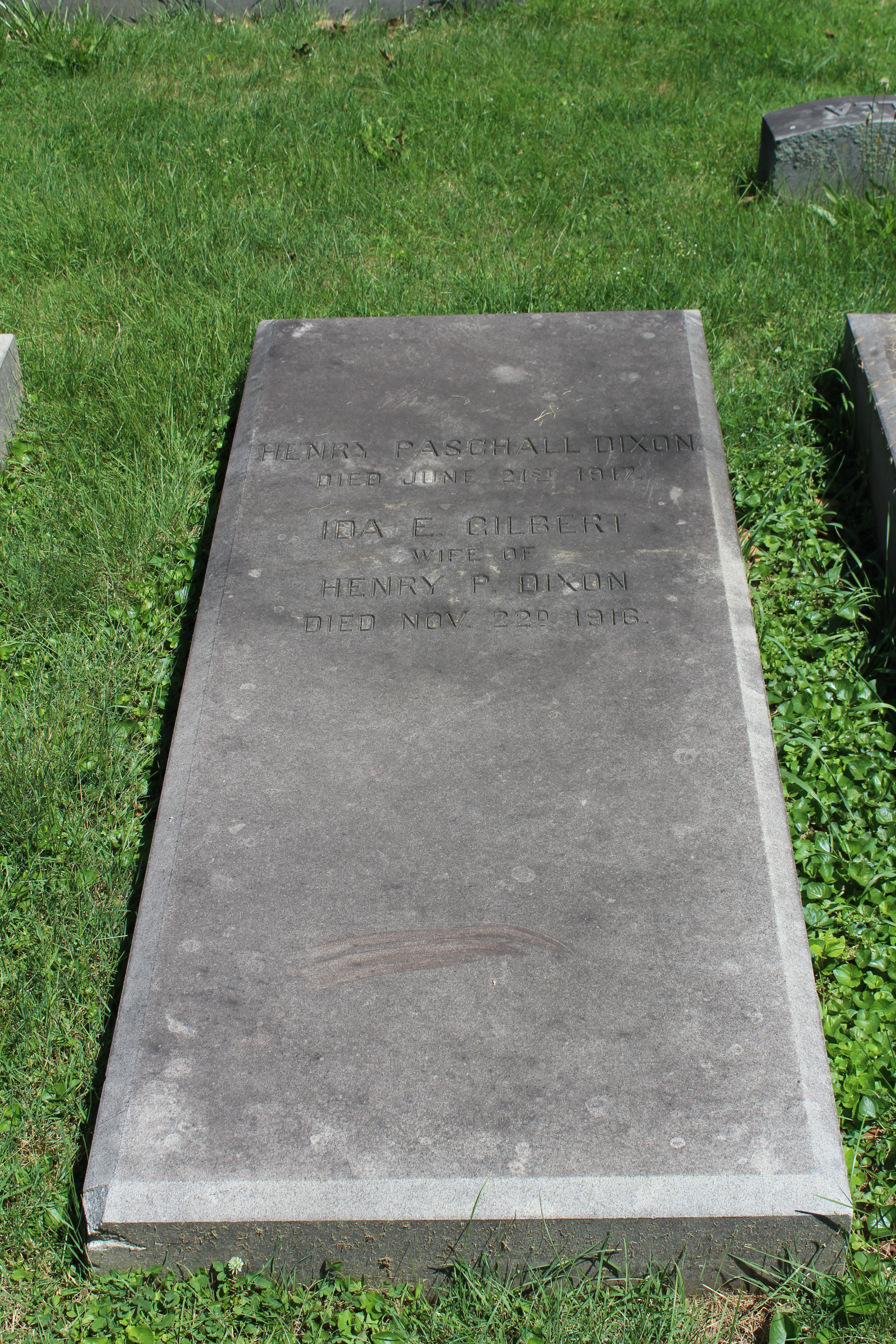
Ida Dixon tombstone in Laurel Hill Cemetery

Dixon died at her Wallingford home on November 22, 1916, following a three-month illness and was interred at Laurel Hill Cemetery in Philadelphia. She was survived by her husband and son, Clayton G. Dixon.

== Legacy ==
The Ida E. Dixon Cup golf tournament—established on September 25, 1917—has been held every year since 1917 with the exception of 1943 during World War II, and 1975, when the event was cancelled due to rain. The winner of the golf tournament is awarded the Ida E. Dixon Memorial Cup, which is named in her honor.
