= Warren Wood =

American amateur golfer (1887–1926)

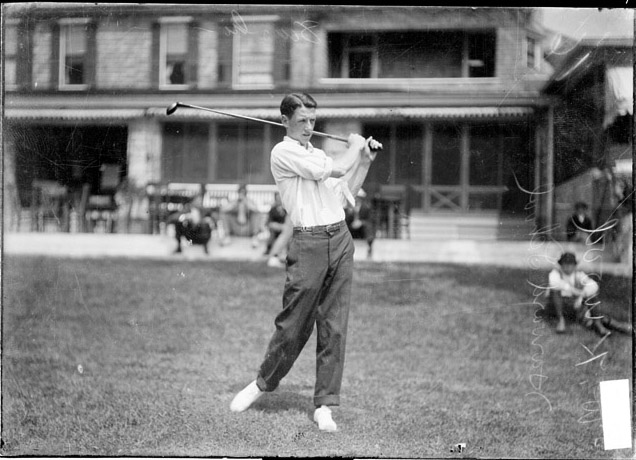
- Wood in 1905

Medal record

Men's golf

Representing the United States

Olympic Games
| Gold medal – first place | 1904 St. Louis | Team |

Warren Kenneth Wood (April 27, 1887 – October 27, 1926) was an American amateur golfer who competed in the 1904 Summer Olympics.

== Early life ==
Wood was born on April 27, 1887, to John Wood and Maud M. Wood (née Heath). He married Maude Langon on June 28, 1911, in Chicago, Illinois. Two daughters, Marjorie and Frances, were born to the couple.

== Golf career ==
=== 1904 Summer Olympics ===
In 1904, Wood was part of the American team which won the gold medal. He finished 10th in the team competition. In the individual competition, he finished 11th in the qualification and was eliminated in the first round of the match play.

=== Major amateur tournaments ===
Wood won the 1906 North and South Amateur. He also won the 1913 Western Amateur and was runner-up twice more (1906, 1912). He was also runner-up in the 1910 U.S. Amateur. Wood finished fourth in the 1907 Western Open.

=== Later career ===
In a golf foursomes match contested on 19 August 1921, Wood and Chick Evans played against Jock Hutchison and Phil Gaudin. It is unclear who won the match but a large gallery of more than 2,000 spectators watched the match which was played at the Lincoln Park public links in Chicago. Sailors from the Great Lakes Naval Station held the ropes to keep the large throng of fans in order.

== Military service ==
Wood was a soldier in World War I. When the war concluded on November 11, 1918, he received his travel orders to return to the United States and departed Brest, France, on January 24, 1919, aboard the RMS Celtic, arriving in New York on February 3.

== Death and legacy ==
Wood's grave (center right) at Oak Woods Cemetery

Wood died on October 27, 1926, in Pelham Manor, New York, aged 39. He was interred in Oak Woods Cemetery, Chicago, Illinois. Wood is best remembered for helping the United States win a team gold medal in golf at the 1904 Summer Olympic games.
