= James Maiden =

Scottish-American professional golfer (1881–1958)

Personal information
- Full name: James Cameron Maiden
- Nationality: Scotland; United States
- Born: 1 October 1881 Carnoustie, Angus, Scotland
- Died: 13 January 1958 (aged 76) Glen Cove, New York
- Spouse: Elizabeth MacGillivray
- Children: 2

Career
- Sport: Golf
- Status: Professional
- Professional wins: 3

Number of wins by tour
- PGA Tour: 1

Best results in major championships
- Masters Tournament: DNP
- PGA Championship: DNP
- U.S. Open: T3: 1906
- The Open Championship: DNP

James Cameron Maiden (1 October 1881 – 13 January 1958) was a Scottish-American professional golfer. He was born in Carnoustie, Scotland, the son of a payroll clerk at a local foundry. He emigrated from Scotland to the United States in 1901. He won the 1906 Ohio Open and the Eastern PGA in 1909. In 1924 he won the Long Island Open, a PGA Tour event at the time. He was a founding member of the PGA of America in 1916.

== Early life ==
Maiden was the son of James Maiden (1841–1914) and Elspeth Maiden née McLean (1845–1928). He left Scotland in 1901 and emigrated to the United States, became a naturalized citizen.

His brother, Stewart Maiden (1886–1948), was also a golf professional whose base was at East Lake Golf Club at the Atlanta Athletic Club. Both of the Maiden brothers are credited with helping teach the golf swing to Bobby Jones. It was Stewart Maiden's smooth, silky swing that initially caught Jones's eye, and he said he tried to emulate Stewart's swing.

== Professional career ==
In the early 1900s, Maiden took a job as assistant under head professional Alex Smith at Nassau Country Club in Glen Cove, New York.

Rodman Wanamaker, the wealthy proprietor of the Wanamaker department stores (now Macy's), and a number of golf professionals—including the legendary Walter Hagen and leading amateurs of the era—gathered at Wanamaker's invitation for a luncheon at the Taplow Club in the Martinique Hotel on Broadway and West 32nd Street in New York City on 17 January 1916. Wanamaker believed golf professionals could enhance equipment sales if they formed an association. It was during this meeting that Maiden, Herbert Strong, James Hepburn, Jack Hobens, Jack Mackie, Gilbert Nicholls and Robert White were chosen as the organizing committee of the PGA of America. The Taplow Club gathering initiated a series of several meetings over the next several months and, on 10 April 1916, the PGA of America was officially established with 35 charter members.

In 1923, Bobby Jones paid a visit to Nassau Country Club and at the suggestion of Maiden bought a putter from him, a club which Maiden had nicknamed "Calamity Jane". Jones, who was struggling with his putting at the time, would go on to use the putter with astounding success for the next seven years until his retirement from competitive golf in 1930 after winning the Grand Slam. The Maiden brothers are portrayed in the 2004 biographical drama film, Bobby Jones: Stroke of Genius, which is based on the life of Bobby Jones.

Maiden's main duties as a club professional were to give lessons and repair and build clubs for members at the courses where he worked, therefore his appearances in tournaments were minimal. His most important achievement as a player was a tie for third place in the 1906 U.S. Open. Years later—at the age of 42—he would win the 1924 Long Island Open, a PGA Tour event at the time.

== Personal life ==
Maiden was married to Elizabeth MacGillivray (born 1889) and they had two children, James Cameron Maiden, Jr. (1914–2005) and Natalie Maiden Vasiliu (born 1918). Natalie was married to the noted Romanian-American author of children's books, Mircea Vasiliu (1920–2008).

== Death ==
Maiden died on 13 January 1958 in Glen Cove, New York. Interment was in the Nassau Knolls Cemetery, Port Washington, New York.

== Professional wins (3) ==
=== PGA Tour wins ===
- 1924 Long Island Open

=== Other wins (2) ===
- 1906 Ohio Open
- 1909 Eastern PGA
