= Green Hills Country Club =

Country club in Millbrae, California

Green Hills Country Club, located in Millbrae, California, is a private members-only country club located on the San Francisco peninsula approximately 20 minutes south of the city. Green Hills was originally known as the Union League Golf and Country Club of San Francisco when it was built in 1929, opening in 1930.

Green Hills Country Club has hosted a number of prestigious tournaments, including the U.S. Open and Senior Open qualifying. For many decades, the club was host of the annual Professional Baseball Player-Babe Ruth Cancer Fund golf tournament with stars such as Ty Cobb, Bing Crosby, Lefty O'Doul, Leo Durocher and many others.

== History ==
Union League Golf and Country Club
- Interactive map of Union League Golf and Country Club
- Address: Millbrae, California; USA
- Coordinates: 37°36′19″N 122°24′45″W
- Type: Golf and leisure club

Construction
- Groundbreaking: January 6, 1929
- Opened: April 27, 1930
- Closed: 1933; 93 years ago
- Years active: 1929 - 1933
- Cost: $540,000 (equivalent to $10,125,000 in 2025)
- Architect: Alister MacKenzie
- General contractor: Charles T. Magill

The Union League Golf and Country Club of San Francisco was constructed in 1929 (opening in 1930) in Millbrae, California, United States. It was one of the most ambitious golf and country club projects of its era in Northern California. It was conceived in the prosperous time that proceeded the Great Depression by a prominent group of San Francisco businessmen (primarily Union League of San Francisco club members) who would spare no expense during the design-phase of the project. The golf course was designed by Alister MacKenzie who considered it one of the top three courses on the West Coast. The unforeseen economic downturn of the Great Depression caused the club to become financially insolvent and in 1933 it was reorganized as Millbrae Country Club. In 1945 the club was named Green Hills Country Club.

=== Search for the site ===
The Union League members began searching for a site to build a world-class facility in the 1920s. They spent years looking for a property that was: [1] near the city of San Francisco, [2] land suitable for the construction of a championship golf course, [3] property with a natural water supply, and [4] weather that was outside of the fog belt. In 1927 they found the ideal site for the club in the hills above a small town on the San Francisco Peninsula, Millbrae. The site featured very fertile land, in fact the property had been cultivated as a nursery for many decades. Flowers and shrubs grown on the property were actually utilized by famed horticulturist John MacLaren in the 1915 Pan Pacific Exposition, or World's Fair. The property had year-round water (from natural creeks), and undulating topography featuring gorgeous vistas. The property could be reached from San Francisco by the members’ automobiles traveling down a road that led to the Peninsula, the El Camino Real.

=== Design team ===
After the land was secured the Union League selected a design team that could build a world-class golf course, and a modern clubhouse. The Union League members would spare no expense in the golf and building architects.

The members of the future Union League Golf and Country Club retained renowned golf course architect Alister MacKenzie (who was responsible for Cypress Point, Augusta National and many others) to design an 18-hole golf course on the property. MacKenzie would be aided by two-time U.S. Amateur Champion Henry Chandler Egan and collegiate champion Robert Hunter.

The prestigious design firm of Willis Polk and Company was chosen as the clubhouse architect. Willis Polk and Company were highly acclaimed and responsible for many architectural gems throughout Northern California. Willis Polk, who was considered the architectural mastermind of the rebuilding of San Francisco after the 1906 earthquake, died in 1924. His architectural firm, however carried on in his tradition and developed the plans for the Union League Golf and Country Club structure. The chief architect in charge of the project was Angus McSweeney.

MacKenzie, with help from Hunter and Egan, utilized the existing topography and with minimal grading sculpted an 18-hole layout that would soon draw rave reviews as a world-class golf course. The course featured some of the most undulating greens ever built and the bunkering rivaled recently completed Cypress Point in Monterey. According to news accounts, "No expense has been spared to build the best. As witness of that, the piping is of cast iron. But one other course in Northern California has that, it is said".

In 1929, when MacKenzie was shaping the land into what is now Green Hills he said “When the Millbrae course is completed it will rank with the first three in the San Francisco district and will be one of the sportiest in the entire state. The natural topography has made it easy for us to plot the course, and with plenty of water for the tees and fairways, the new club will be one of the finest of its kind on the coast”.

=== The opening ===
The San Francisco press covered the April 27, 1930, opening day events and gave glowing reviews to the golf course, calling it "happy valley" and "the equal of anything in Northern California." A local newspaper indicated "MacKenzie, in fact, was loud in praise of the topography of the acreage, and declares it one of his best pieces of work, which is ample praise, coming from the reticent Englishman."

Groundbreaking of The Union League Golf and Country Club took place on January 6, 1929, ten months prior to the crash of the Stock Market. Although the course was ready for play in January 1930, the members voted to delay opening until "all possibility of damage to the greens by premature use" had been eliminated. (There was also a "washout" on the first fairway that required 7,800 feet (2,400 m) of "drain tile" prior to the opening).

The Golf Course officially opened to considerable fanfare on April 27, 1930, when more than 200 golfers teed off at the new golf course that the press called "one of the finest in California". The first ceremonial ball was hit from a silver tee by Samuel Welfield, the club's vice president, as the president, William J. Bevan, was out of town.

The San Francisco Press reported, "The course measures from the middle tees 6,300 yards (5,800 m), and from Champion tees, 6,665 yards (6,094 m). There are two routes to each hole, after the typical MacKenzie fashion, for the dub and star alike." They went on to say, "The acreage, which used to be a nursery, still bears the resemblance. On several of the fairways the roughs are fruit tree orchards. The entire 145 acres (0.59 km^{2}) are bordered and dotted by cypress, pine, oak, redwood and other variety of trees. Over 100,000 saplings are being nursed for further beautification of the land."

In 1930 a prominent sign was placed at the corner of El Camino Real and Ludeman Lane. The words "Union League Golf and Country Club 1,800 feet (550 m) West could be seen by anyone on El Camino Real. A picture of the sign, with the 16 Mile House (at its original location) in the background, was included in the Sunday August 10, 1930, issue of the San Francisco Chronicle. Opening of the Union League Golf Course was the feature story on the front page of the newspaper.

The cost of building the golf course, including MacKenzie’s fee, amounted to $140,000. The cost to purchase the land was $250,000. The clubhouse and furnishing generated another $150,000 which brought the total cost to approximately $540,000.

The contractor for the clubhouse project was Charles T. Magill, a member of the Union League Club in San Francisco. Magill won the "opening day" golf tournament.

The original fee to join the Union League Club was $1,250 with membership limited to 300. The opening gala dedication and dinner dance was held on August 23, 1930. The San Mateo Times reported that "Over three hundred members and their friends gathered in the new building which is one of the finest country clubs in California, and enjoyed the delightful entertainment prepared by the inauguration committee."

The times went on to report, "W.J. Bevan, Burlingame resident and vice-president of the Wells Fargo Bank of San Francisco is president of the club and has directed the details of construction which brings to the Peninsula a new golf course and clubhouse that is a real asset to the community. The new club is complete in every detail that could add to the comfort and pleasure of the members. It is a structure of charming architecture and embodies every modern facility of an up to date clubhouse."

The first head professional was Harry Kennett. Sam Smith, a former Harding Park starter, was the first "starter" and assistant Club Manager. The first Club Manager was C.L. Westlake.

=== MacKenzie and the design team ===
Alister MacKenzie was acknowledged to be one of the three leading golf course architects of his day (along with A. W. Tillinghast and Donald Ross) and was the author of Golf Course Design which told of his design philosophy. MacKenzie influenced countless architects from that time to the present. He also wrote The Spirit of St. Andrews, which became the famous "lost manuscript" until it was rediscovered and published long after his death in 1934.

Robert Hunter was a good golfer and a socialite with "connections" that helped bring attention to various MacKenzie course design projects. He oversaw construction of the course in collaboration with MacKenzie. His gregarious manner also helped to build membership after the club was formed. Moreover, Hunter was a devotee of links-style golf courses and published a seminal book on golf course architecture titled Links.

H. Chandler Egan, was a golfing champion of national stature having won the U. S. Amateur Championship in 1904 and 1905 and the Pacific Northwest championship in 1915, 1920, 1923, 1925 and 1932. He was also an accomplished architect in his own right, having designed several outstanding courses in Oregon. He also achieved considerable acclaim for his remodeling of Pebble Beach Golf Links in preparation for the 1929 U. S. Amateur Championship. He redesigned the greens and bunkering giving them a ragged, natural seaside look that was very dramatic. (It is worth noting that Egan finished second in that 1929 U.S. Amateur Championship). MacKenzie, however, redesigned the eighth hole which has been acclaimed as one of the great par fours of the world. Significantly, Bobby Jones was defeated early in that 1929 championship which led to his visiting Cypress Point and Pasatiempo. These visits prompted Bobby Jones to select Mackenzie for the design of Augusta National in place of Donald Ross and a tradition was born.

=== Economic realities ===
By 1933 economic reality set in and the Union League Golf and Country Club filed for bankruptcy. The club was reorganized as semi-private Millbrae Golf and Country Club. During the period around World War II many of the original MacKenzie bunkers were filled in (a cost-cutting measure that occurred in golf courses throughout America) and sodded over. In 1945 Millbrae Golf and Country Club became the private Green Hills Country Club, which it remains to this day.

During the 1990s many of the original MacKenzie design features (and bunkers) were restored.

=== New Clubhouse ===
In 2007, the original clubhouse was demolished. A new clubhouse opened in 2009.
