= La Grange Country Club =

Golf club in La Grange, Illinois

Coordinates: 41.801°N 87.881°W

- Interactive map of La Grange Country Club

Club information
- Location: La Grange, Illinois
- Established: 1899, 127 years ago
- Type: Private
- Tota holes: 18
- Tournaments: U.S. Women's Open (1974, 1981)
- Website: La Grange CC
- Designed by: Herbert J. Tweedie; Tom Bendelow
- Par: 71
- Length: 6,738 yards (6,161 m) Longest hole is #7 - 573 yards (524 m)
- Course rating: 72.7
- Slope rating: 134

La Grange Country Club is a private golf club in La Grange, Illinois, a suburb southwest of Chicago.

Founded 127 years ago in 1899 and designed by Herbert J. Tweedie as a nine-hole golf course, the club relocated to its present location in 1913 and was expanded to 18 holes. It hosted the U.S. Women's Open, an LPGA major championship, in 1974 and 1981, and underwent a major renovation in 2001.
