= Herbert J. Tweedie =

English golf course architect (1864–1906)

Herbert Tweedie
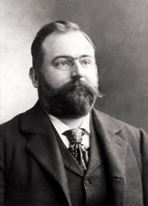
- Tweedie, c. 1898
- Born: Herbert James Tweedie, Jr. July 21, 1864; Bombay, India
- Died: July 9, 1906 (aged 41); Chicago, Illinois, U.S.
- Occupation: Golf course architect
- Spouse: Mary Ellen Armson
- Children: 8

Herbert James Tweedie, Jr. (July 21, 1864 – July 9, 1906) was an English golf course architect. Tweedie was one of the first golf course designers to build courses in the American Midwest.

== Early life ==
Tweedie was born in Bombay, India, on July 21, 1864, to parents of Scottish ancestry. He spent his formative years in Hoylake, England, where his father was a founding member of the Royal Liverpool Golf Club in 1869. Growing up next to the links, Tweedie learned the game alongside the great English amateurs John Ball and Harold Hilton and twice defeated Ball to win Hoylake's Junior Championship in the 1870s. He was also a frequent playing companion of Bernard Nicholls at Hoylake.

== Emigration to the U.S. ==
He sailed from Liverpool aboard the RMS Umbria of the Cunard Line and arrived in New York City on July 26, 1886. He and his family then relocated to Chicago in 1887. Tweedie was instrumental in working with Charles B. Macdonald to establish golf in the Chicago area. Tweedie designed a number of golf courses, primarily in Illinois. Among them was the Midlothian Country Club in Midlothian, Illinois, located 18 miles (29 km) southwest of Chicago and built on 208 acres (84 ha) of land. The course opened for play in 1898. Another was Waukegan Country Club which he designed and built in 1900 which later re-organized as Glen Flora Country Club in Waukegan in 1911. Tweedie's last place of employment before his death was at Belmont Golf Club in Downers Grove, Illinois, where he was the president. He laid out the original course in 1899.

In 1902, Tweedie was a contestant in the U.S. Amateur Championship which was played at the Glen View Club in Chicago, Illinois, where he was a member. He lost one of his matches to Phelps B. Hoyt by the score of 5 and 3. The tournament was won by Louis N. James by a score of 4 and 2 over Eben Byers.

Ironically, Hoyt spearheaded an effort to raise funds for Tweedie's widow and children who were left without provisions for their future after Tweedie's death.

== Courses designed ==
Note: This list may be incomplete.

- Exmoor Country Club (1902) – Private in Highland Park, Illinois
- Flossmoor Country Club (1899) – Private in Flossmoor, Illinois
- La Grange Country Club (1899) – Private in La Grange, Illinois
- Maple Bluff Country Club (1899) – Private in Madison, Wisconsin
- Midlothian Country Club (1898) – Private in Midlothian, Illinois
- Park Ridge Country Club (1906) – Private in Park Ridge, Illinois
- Ridge Country Club (1902) – Private in Chicago, Illinois
- Rockford Country Club (1899) – Private in Rockford, Illinois
- Belmont Golf Club (1899) – Public in Downers Grove, Illinois
- Waukegan Country Club (1900) - Private in Waukegan, Illinois
- Glen View Club^{†} (1897) – Private in Chicago, Illinois

== Death ==
At his death on July 9, 1906, Tweedie left a widow and eight children, seven of whom were step-children. A committee made up of Phelps B. Hoyt, president of the Western Golf Association, and others, sent out an appeal to raise funds for Tweedie's estate. According to an article dated July 24, 1906, and published in The Sun newspaper in New York, Tweedie's large family was left with "absolutely no means of support".

== Notes ==
^{†} Architect was Richard Leslie, with consultation from Tweedie.
