= Point O'Woods Golf & Country Club =

Golf club in Benton Township, Michigan

Point O' Woods Golf & Country Club
- Interactive map of Point O' Woods Golf & Country Club
- 42°08′06″N 86°21′34″W

Club information
- Location: Benton Charter Township, Michigan, United States
- Established: 1958
- Type: Private
- Tota holes: 18
- Website: www.pointowoods.com
- Designed by: Robert Trent Jones

The Point O' Woods Golf & Country Club is a private golf club located in Benton Township, Berrien County, Michigan, United States, near Benton Harbor.

== History ==
In 1954, local residents C.E. (Bud) Blake, Charles W. Gore, Richard Merrill, Malcolm Ross and Frederick S. Upton expressed interest in a new golf club in the Benton Harbor/St. Joseph area. When land owned by Donald H. Ross became available, the group contacted Robert Trent Jones to inquire whether he approved of the location as viable for a championship golf course; after inspection of the property, he was impressed and agreed to design the course. After the group secured funding, the project proceeded: Ground was broken in the Spring of 1957, and the course opened June 14, 1958.

Point O' Woods Golf and Country Club is rated 96th among Golfweek Magazine's Top 100 Classic golf courses in the United States in the 2009 rankings.

== Tournaments ==
Point O' Woods was the host of the Western Amateur annually from 1971 to 2008.
