= Glen View Club =

Private country club in Golf, Illinois

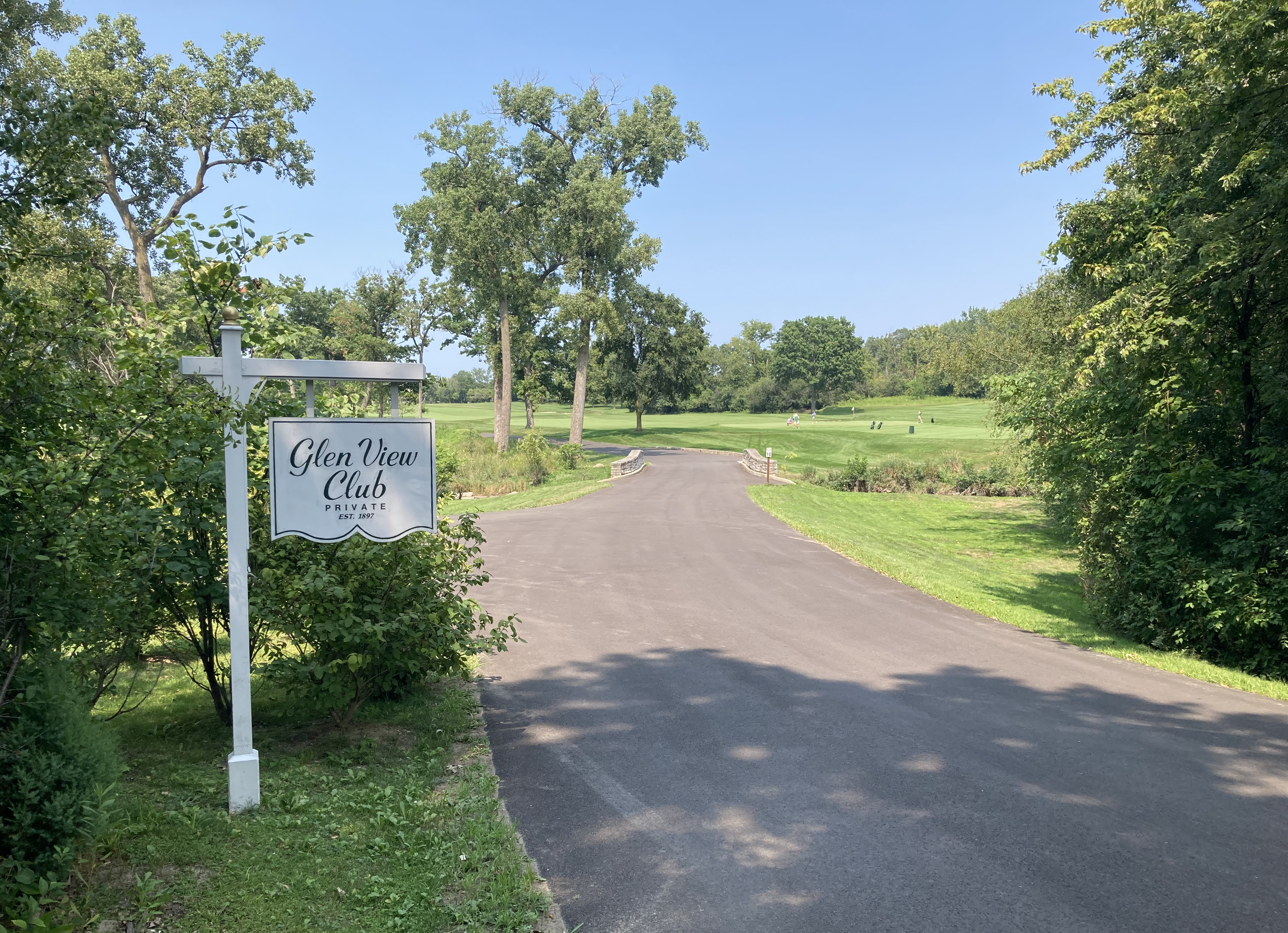
- Interactive map of Glen View Club

Club information
- Location: Golf, Illinois, U.S.
- Established: 1897; 129 years ago
- Type: Private
- Tota holes: 18
- Tournaments: U.S. Open: (1904); U.S. Amateur: (1902); Western Open: (1899); Western Amateur: (1899)
- Website: glenviewclub.com
- Designed by: Richard Leslie, with Herbert J. Tweedie (original); Tom Bendelow (1910); Harry Colt, Donald Ross (1913); William S. Flynn (1922)
- Par: 72
- Length: 6,948 yards (6,353 m)
- Course rating: 73.4
- Slope rating: 139

Glen View Club is a private country club located in Golf, Illinois, a suburb just north of Chicago.

== History ==
Founded 129 years ago by a group of Chicago businessmen on March 29, 1897, it was originally the Glen View Golf and Polo Club; its name was shortened a few years later to the Glen View Club. The club was situated so as to be close to a commuter railroad from Chicago, and the village of Golf got its name from the simple sign – "Golf" – that directed riders from the makeshift station to the course.

In 1899, Glen View Club was one of the founding clubs of the Western Golf Association and hosted the inaugural Western Open and Western Amateur tournaments that same year. Other notable founding clubs included Chicago Golf Club, Skokie Country Club, Onwentsia Club, and Evanston Golf Club.

== Golf ==
The par-72 golf course at Glen View measures 6,948 yards (6,353 m) from the back tees, and carries a rating of 73.4 and a slope of 139.

Richard Leslie, the first head professional, who consulted with Herbert J. Tweedie on the design, is credited with the original layout of the golf course.

In 1910, Tom Bendelow was credited with changes to Glen View’s hazard scheme. Bendelow is well known for his designs at Medinah Country Club, Skokie Country Club, Beverly Country Club, East Lake Golf Club and Olympia Fields Country Club.

In 1913, two of the games most prolific architects, Harry Colt and Donald Ross, began changes to Glen View. Harry Colt, referred to frequently as H.S. or more formally as Henry Shapland, was known for participating in the design of over 300 golf courses around the globe, primarily in the United Kingdom. His most notable work in the United States was with George Arthur Crump at Pine Valley Golf Club, a course frequently ranked as the best in the country.

Donald Ross is most famous for his work at Pinehurst No. 2, Interlachen Country Club Aronimink Golf Club, East Lake Golf Club, Seminole Golf Club, Oak Hill Country Club, Inverness Club and Oakland Hills.

In 1922, select holes of Glen View were redesigned by William S. Flynn. Flynn is most well-known for his design of Shinnecock Hills (on Long Island, New York).

The course as it stands today still includes elements from each of the aforementioned architects.

Glen View was the home club of the legendary Chick Evans (1890–1979), the namesake of the Evans Scholars Program. A member of the World Golf Hall of Fame, he won both the U.S. Amateur and the U.S. Open in 1916, and a second U.S. Amateur in 1920.

The course has hosted several major tournaments, including the inaugural Western Open and Western Amateur in 1899, the U.S. Amateur in 1902, and the U.S. Open in 1904. Annual member events include a member-member tournament called the "Royal and Ancient," and a member-guest tournament called "Twa Days."

== Clubhouse ==
The original clubhouse was designed by Holabird & Roche, known today as Holabird & Root, with help from consulting architect Daniel Burnham. The original clubhouse opened in 1898 but was destroyed by a fire in May 1920. The club once again turned to Holabird & Roche to design a new clubhouse that was built on the same site and exists to this day.

== Other activities ==
The club also has facilities for paddle tennis, tennis, skeet and trap shooting, ice skating, and swimming.
