= Chandler Egan =

American amateur golfer

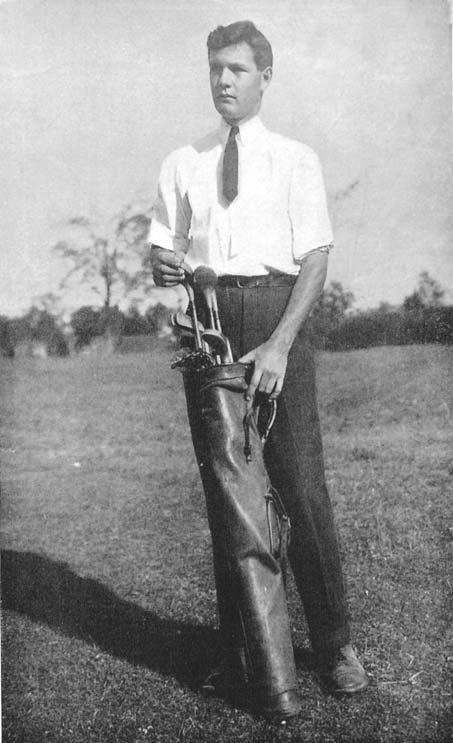
- Egan, circa 1904

Personal information
- Full name: Henry Chandler Egan
- Nationality: United States
- Born: August 21, 1884 Chicago, Illinois, U.S.
- Died: April 5, 1936 (aged 51) Everett, Washington, U.S.
- Spouses: Nina Lydia McNally (m.1910–1916); Alice Barrett Scudder (m.1917–1936) his death
- Children: 1

Career
- Sport: Golf
- College: Harvard University
- Status: Amateur

Best results in major championships (wins: 2)
- Masters Tournament: 60th: 1935
- PGA Championship: DNP
- U.S. Open: T8: 1906
- The Open Championship: DNP
- U.S. Amateur: Won: 1904, 1905
- British Amateur: T129: 1934
Medal record
Men's golf
Representing United States
Olympic Games
Gold medal – first place	1904 St. Louis	Men's team
Silver medal – second place	1904 St. Louis	Individual

Henry Chandler Egan (August 21, 1884 – April 5, 1936) was an American amateur golfer and golf course architect of the early 20th century.

== Early life and college ==
Egan was born in Chicago, Illinois, which at the end of the 19th century was the epicenter of golf in the United States – the first 18-hole golf course in the country, the Chicago Golf Club, in Wheaton, was built there in 1895. Egan played his first game of golf in Lake Geneva, Wisconsin at the age of 12. He attended secondary school at the Rugby School in Kenilworth, and was a star football player on its team. The school did not have a golf team, so Chandler developed his golf game at his father's club, Exmoor Country Club. He was accepted to Harvard University, where he soon became the captain of the college golf team. The team won three team NCAA Division I Men's Golf Championships from 1902 to 1904, and Egan won the individual title in 1902.

== Championships and Olympics ==
Egan won his first non-collegiate tournament in the 1902 Western Amateur, which was played at the Chicago Golf Club. Not only was the tournament played in his home metropolitan area, but the runner-up was his cousin Walter Egan. A year later, the Egan cousins switched places with Walter winning and Chandler coming in second, and Chandler Egan would win the tournament again in 1904, 1905 (with Walter again the runner-up), and 1907.

In 1904, Egan achieved the pinnacle of U.S. amateur golf success by winning the U.S. Amateur, played at Baltusrol Golf Club in New Jersey. He successfully defended his title a year later at his home turf of the Chicago Golf Club.

Egan appeared to be peaking at the right time to also win an individual silver medal at the 1904 Summer Olympics, which featured golf for the last time in 1904. While Egan's U.S. team (which also included cousin Walter) won team gold, Egan had to settle for individual silver, as he was defeated by Canadian George Lyon, who at 46, was more than twice Egan's age. Egan later admitted he had been outclassed by the wily Lyon, whose massive drives forced Egan out of his usual game.

== Move to Oregon ==
Following his runner-up finish in the 1909 U.S. Amateur, Egan abruptly disappeared from competition. He reappeared in the news in May 1911 with his purchase of 115 acres (0.47 km^{2}) of apple and pear orchard in Medford, Oregon. He reemerged on the competitive golf circuit in 1914, with a runner-up finish in the Pacific Northwest Amateur championship to Jack Neville. A year later, Egan and Neville would meet again, and this time, Egan was the winner. He would win the Pacific Northwest Amateur four more times, in 1920, 1923, 1925, and 1932. Egan traveled south to win the California State Amateur in 1926. He played on two U.S. championship Walker Cup teams in 1930 and 1934.

== Golf architecture ==
In the 1910s, Egan moved into golf course design, designing such notable Oregon courses as the Eugene Country Club, Eastmoreland Golf Course, Oswego Lake Country Club, Riverside Golf & Country Club, Tualatin Country Club, and Waverley Country Club. In 1929, Egan partnered with legendary golf architect Alister MacKenzie to renovate Pebble Beach Golf Links for the 1929 U.S. Amateur, in which Egan played and reached the semifinals. In 1929 Egan also aided MacKenzie and Hunter during the design and construction of The Union League Golf and Country Club, now known as Green Hills Country Club in Millbrae, California. After Seth Raynor submitted plans to re-design Sequoyah Country Club in Oakland, California just prior his death in 1926, it was Egan who ultimately did a 1930 re-design there. He designed the Indian Canyon municipal course in Spokane, Washington in 1930, which opened in 1935.

== Death and legacy ==
In 1936, Egan had completed plans for West Seattle Golf Course in Seattle, and was working on the half-finished Legion Memorial Golf Course in nearby Everett in late March. He came down with lobar pneumonia, was hospitalized for nearly a week, and died. His funeral was held in Seattle and he was buried in Chicago.

Egan was named to the Pacific Northwest Golf Association Hall of Fame in 1985, and the Oregon Sports Hall of Fame in 1990.

Egan's Olympic medals were discovered after the death of his daughter in 2012. They went on display in 2016 at the USGA Museum, Oakmont Country Club during the U.S. Open and the World Golf Hall of Fame.

== Golf courses designed ==
Egan designed the following golf courses:

- Bend Golf & Country Club Bend, Oregon (original nine)
- Watson Ranch Golf Club, Coos Bay, Oregon
- Eastmoreland Golf Course, Portland, Oregon
- Eugene Country Club, Eugene, Oregon
- Hood River Golf & Country Club, Hood River, Oregon
- Indian Canyon, Spokane, Washington
- Oswego Lake Country Club, Lake Oswego, Oregon
- Pacific Grove Municipal Golf Course, Pacific Grove, California (original nine)
- North Fulton Golf Course, Atlanta, Georgia
- Reames Golf & Country Club, Klamath Falls, Oregon
- Riverside Golf & Country Club, Portland, Oregon (front nine)
- Seaside Golf Club, Seaside, Oregon
- The Oaks at Rogue Valley Country Club, Medford, Oregon
- Plantation Country Club, Boise, Idaho
- The Rogue at Rogue Valley Country Club, Medford, Oregon
- Tualatin Country Club, Tualatin, Oregon
- Legion Memorial Golf Course, Everett, Washington
- Waverley Country Club, Portland, Oregon
- West Seattle Golf Club, Seattle, Washington
- Egan aided Alister MacKenzie and Robert Hunter during the construction of The Union League Golf and Country Club, which is now Green Hills Country Club in Millbrae, California in 1929.
- Egan, along with Robert Hunter, was a construction assistant to Alister Mackenzie on Sharp Park Golf Course, Pacifica, California (1932) Sharp Park is one of MacKenzie's few municipal courses, and his only public seaside links.
- Baywood Golf & Country Club, Arcata, California

== Tournament wins ==
- 1902 NCAA Division I Men's Golf Championships (individual and team), Western Amateur
- 1903 NCAA Division I Men's Golf Championships (team)
- 1904 NCAA Division I Men's Golf Championships (team), Western Amateur, U.S. Amateur
- 1905 Western Amateur, U.S. Amateur
- 1907 Western Amateur
- 1915 Pacific Northwest Amateur
- 1920 Pacific Northwest Amateur
- 1923 Pacific Northwest Amateur
- 1925 Pacific Northwest Amateur
- 1926 California State Amateur, Bahamas Amateur
- 1932 Pacific Northwest Amateur

== Major championships ==
=== Wins (2) ===
Year	Championship	Winning score	Runner-up
1904	U.S. Amateur	8 & 6	(United States) Fred Herreshoff
1905	U.S. Amateur	6 & 5	(United States) Daniel Sawyer

=== Results timeline ===
Tournament	1902	1903	1904	1905	1906	1907	1908	1909
U.S. Open			T20 LA		T8 LA			
U.S. Amateur	QF	R32	1 M	1	R16	R32		2
The Amateur Championship								

Tournament	1910	1911	1912	1913	1914	1915	1916	1917	1918	1919
U.S. Open		T23						NT	NT	
U.S. Amateur	DNQ							NT	NT	
The Amateur Championship					NT	NT	NT	NT	NT	NT

Tournament	1920	1921	1922	1923	1924	1925	1926	1927	1928	1929
U.S. Open										
U.S. Amateur		DNQ			R32					SF
The Amateur Championship										

Tournament	1930	1931	1932	1933	1934	1935
Masters Tournament	NYF	NYF	NYF	NYF		60
U.S. Open						
U.S. Amateur	DNQ		R32	R16	R64	R64
The Amateur Championship					R256	

Win
Top 10
Did not play

M = Medalist
LA = Low amateur
NYF = Tournament not yet founded
NT = No tournament
"T" indicates a tie for a place
DNQ = Did not qualify for match play portion
R64, R32, R16, QF, SF = Round in which player lost in match play

Source for U.S. Open and U.S. Amateur: USGA Championship Database

Source for 1934 British Amateur: The Glasgow Herald, May 22, 1934, pg. 10.

== U.S. national team appearances ==
- Walker Cup: 1930 (winners), 1934 (winners)

== See also ==
- H. Chandler and Alice B. Egan House
