= Alec Ross =

Scottish golfer

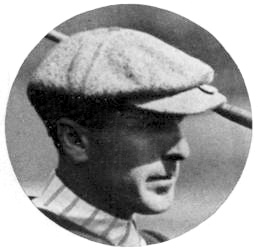

Personal information
- Full name: Alexander Ross
- Nationality: Scotland
- Born: 15 September 1879 Dornoch, Scotland
- Died: 25 June 1952 (aged 72) Miami, Florida, U.S.

Career
- Sport: Golf
- Status: Professional
- Professional wins: 16

Best results in major championships (wins: 1)
- Masters Tournament: DNP
- PGA Championship: DNP
- U.S. Open: Won: 1907
- The Open Championship: DNP

Alexander Ross (15 September 1879 – 25 June 1952) was a Scottish professional golfer.

== Early life ==
Ross grew up in Dornoch, Scotland. Ross's older brother Donald Ross was also a professional golfer and eventually became a famous golf course designer.

== Professional career ==
Early in this career, Ross moved to the United States. Alec, along with his older brother Donald were founding members of The Tin Whistles in 1904. He ultimately found work at Brae Burn Country Club in Newton, Massachusetts. While employed at Brae Burn he won the 1907 U.S. Open at the St. Martin's course at Philadelphia Cricket Club. He competed in the U.S. Open seventeen times in total and finished in the top-10 five times.

Ross had much success at other notable tournaments. His other tournament wins include the North and South Open six times, the Massachusetts Open six times, and the Swiss Open three times.

Later in his career, Ross was a club professional at Detroit Golf Club in Detroit, Michiganfor 31 years.

== Personal life ==
In 1952, Ross died in Miami, Florida.

== Professional wins ==
Note: This list may be incomplete.

- 1902 North and South Open
- 1904 North and South Open
- 1906 Massachusetts Open
- 1907 **U.S. Open**, North and South Open, Massachusetts Open
- 1908 North and South Open, Massachusetts Open
- 1909 Massachusetts Open
- 1910 North and South Open, Massachusetts Open
- 1912 Massachusetts Open
- 1915 North and South Open
- 1923 Swiss Open
- 1925 Swiss Open
- 1926 Swiss Open

Note: major championships in bold

== Major championships ==
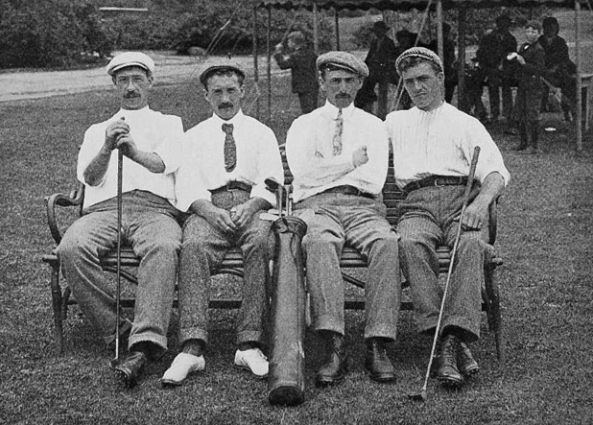
(From left to right): Isaac Mackie, Jack Hobens, Alec Ross, and George Thomson at the 1904 U.S. Open

=== Wins (1) ===
Year	Championship	54 holes	Winning score	Margin	Runner-up
1907	U.S. Open	2 shot deficit	76-74-76-76=302	2 strokes	(United States) Gilbert Nicholls

=== Results timeline ===
Note: Ross played only in the U.S. Open.

Tournament	1902	1903	1904	1905	1906	1907	1908	1909
U.S. Open	10	T9	T15	T13	6	**1**	T23	37

Tournament	1910	1911	1912	1913	1914	1915	1916	1917	1918	1919
U.S. Open	22	T9	CUT	T36	T22			NT	NT	T16

Tournament	1920	1921	1922	1923	1924	1925	1926
U.S. Open	T27						T34

Win
Top 10
Did not play

NT = No tournament
CUT = missed the half-way cut
"T" indicates a tie for a place

== See also ==
- List of golfers with most wins in one PGA Tour event
