= Walter Egan (golfer) =

American golfer

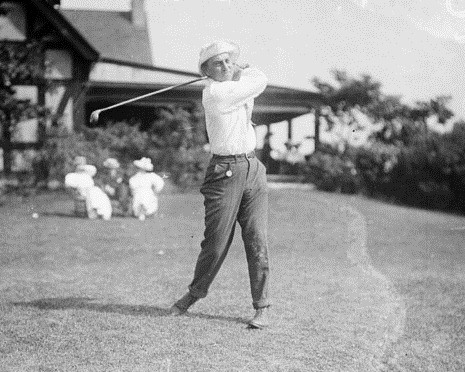
- Egan in 1905

Medal record

Men's golf

Representing the United States

Olympic Games
Gold medal – first place	1904 St. Louis	Men's team

Walter Eugene Egan (June 2, 1881 – September 12, 1971) was an American golfer who competed in the late 1890s and early 1900s.

== Career ==
Egan came to prominence in his teens when he was playing at Onwentsia Club and attending University School on the north side of Chicago. He helped University win the Preparatory League championship in 1899. The same year he astonished his elders by taking second to David Forgan in the Western Amateur. In 1902 he again took second in the event, this time to his cousin, H. Chandler Egan, but finally won the brass ring in 1903 when he got revenge on Chandler by beating him by one stroke. Egan was runner-up three times, including twice to his cousin Chandler. In 1901, Egan was the runner-up in the U.S. Amateur.

Egan compete in the 1904 Summer Olympics. He was part of the American team which won the gold medal. He finished 19th in this competition. In the individual competition, he finished fourth in the qualification and was eliminated in the first round of the match play.
