= Bernard Nicholls =

English-American professional golfer (1877–1924)

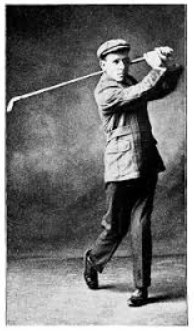
- Nicholls, c. 1897

Personal information
- Full name: Frank Bernard Nicholls
- Nickname: Ben
- Nationality: England; United States
- Born: 19 April 1877 Dover, Kent, England
- Died: 3 November 1924 (aged 47) Philadelphia, Pennsylvania
- Spouse: Minnie Sharp
- Children: 2

Career
- Sport: Golf
- Turned professional: c. 1894

Best results in major championships
- U.S. Open: T4: 1904
- The Open Championship: T10: 1909

Frank Bernard "Ben" Nicholls (19 April 1877 – 3 November 1924) was an American professional golfer and golf course designer of English birth. He compiled an outstanding record in a golf career that included five top-10 finishes in the U.S. Open and one T10 finish in the Open Championship.

In 1900, during Harry Vardon's exhibition tour, Nicholls did what no other golfer in North America could accomplish—beat Harry Vardon. Nicholls defeated the legendary British golfer in two separate matches in resounding fashion.

== Early life ==
Nicholls was born in Dover, Kent, England. He was the son of Frank Nicholls (1851–1930) and Lois Elizabeth Cordrey (1855–1935). Nicholls married Minnie Sharp on 16 May 1898 at St. George's Church in Deal, Kent, England. Prior to leaving England he worked at an athletic goods store in Liverpool and was almost a daily visitor to the Royal Liverpool Golf Club links at Hoylake, county of Cheshire. In his days at Hoylake he became good friends with fellow English golfers John Ball, Jr. – the great amateur player – and Herbert Tweedie who would later become a golf course architect.

== Golf career ==
=== Early golf career ===
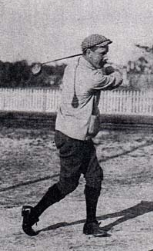
Nicholls, c. 1905

At the age of 17, Nicholls – who was called "Ben" by those who knew him – was hired to design a golf course in France and by 1899 was the head professional at the Philadelphia Country Club. On 13 July 1905 he played in the first professional golf tournament ever played on a public links golf course in the United States when he competed in an Open Tournament at the Van Cortlandt Park course. Nicholls and Willie Anderson finished joint second five shots behind Isaac Mackie.

He worked at Whitemarsh Valley Country Club in 1912–13 and was at Wilmington Country Club with his younger brother Gilbert Nicholls in 1914. In 1915 he took a position at LuLu Country Club in Glenside, Pennsylvania, and worked there until late 1916. When he registered for the draft during World War I on 9 September 1918 he was working at the Charlotte Country Club in Charlotte, North Carolina.

=== Golf course architecture ===
Nicholls stated on 20 February 1916, "In the year 1894, at the age of 17, I was called to France to lay out the first golf course in Paris, which was but a miniature affair on an island situated in the Seine. In connection with this work I became acquainted with the Viscomte [Leon] de Janze, one of the oldest leaders of golf in the district of Paris and the man who is responsible for the excellent course at La Boulie ... as well as several others." Viscomte Leon de Janze was the founder of the Societe de Sport de Puteaux in 1896. Nicholls would go on to build another course at Aix-les-Bains in the French eastern frontier.

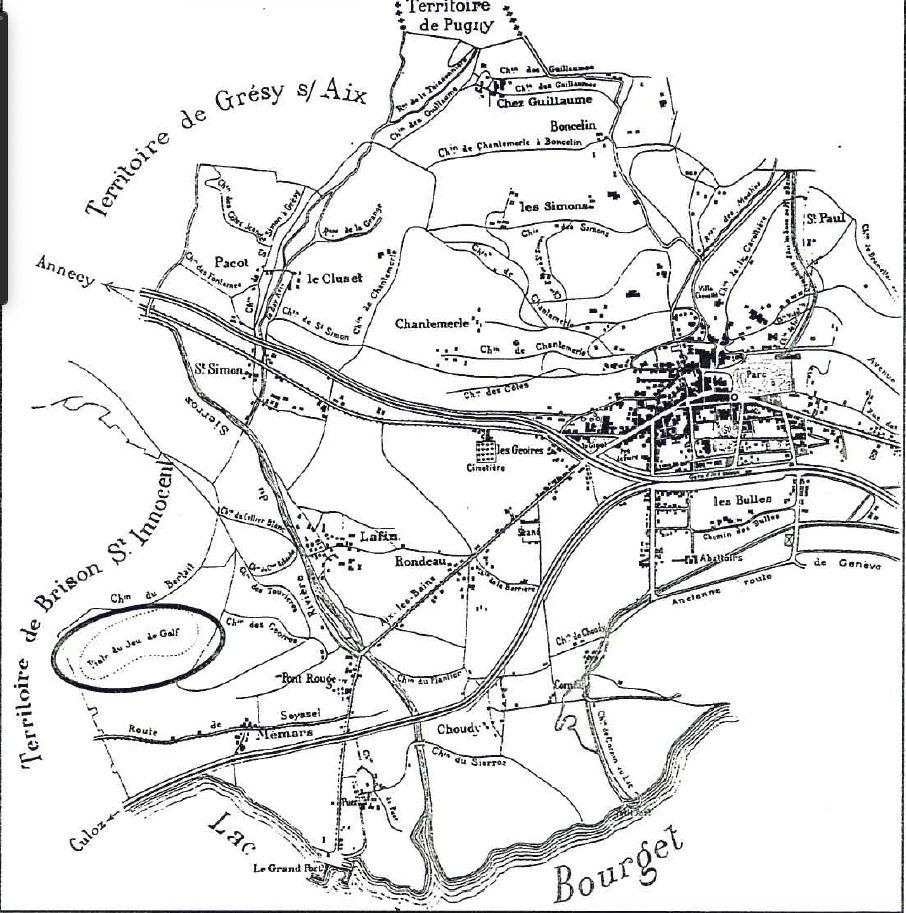

"Nicholls, if you can do that the Bank of France is open to you."

— Docteur Brachet on Nicholls

There, Nicholls said he met Monsieur le Docteur Brachet, a leading physician and "multimillionaire of the place". Brachet said, "I want a golf course in Aix-les-Bains. Far up on the mountain side I have a piece of land. After breakfast we will take the mules and look over this property with a view to building a course there" Corsuet forest. Nicholls mentioned that difficulties were encountered in viewing the land due to the fact that it was heavily wooded. "I saw some beautiful olive and fig trees, but more important, I also saw 60 husky Italian laborers equipped and ready to work. After threading our way through this mountainous woodland and taking another look at the 60 huskies, I promised to give Monsieur Le Docteur a golf course in six weeks", said Nicholls. Brachet retorted, "Nicholls, if you can do that the Bank of France is open to you. Moreover, I will have King Leopold of the Belgians and King George of Greece present for the grand opening".

=== Building Spain's second golf course ===
In Nicholls' memoirs, written in 1916, he stated that he built Spain's second golf course on the Island of Toxa, belonging to Spain and situated in the Bay of Arousa, some 35 miles from Vigo, which Nicholls added, "boasts the second finest harbor in the world. It is said that it is capable of accommodating the combined navies of the world. It was by royal command of his majesty King Alphonso that I undertook the work".

=== Matches against Harry Vardon ===
Nicholls compiled results in the U.S. Open that were superb. He was very consistent in his play from 1897 through 1907, finishing in the top 10 on six occasions. Nicholls had a respectable T10 finish in the 1909 Open Championship held 10–11 June at Royal Cinque Ports Golf Club in Deal, Kent, England. One major feather in the cap of Nicholls is that he was the only player to beat Harry Vardon, the famous British master golfer, on Vardon's 1900 exhibition tour to points across the U.S. and Canada. In fact, Nicholls beat Vardon twice.

On 17 February 1900, at Ormond, Florida, Nicholls soundly defeated Vardon 5 and 4. His second victory over Vardon was on 13 October 1900 at Brae Burn Country Club, West Newton, Massachusetts, when he won 2 up in a 36-hole match.

== Family ==
His wife, Minnie Sharp Nicholls (born 1876), died in 1939. Nicholls had eight siblings: brothers Gilbert, William and Alfred, and sisters Florence, Anne, Clara, Ethel and Blanche. He had two children of his own, son Norman Bernard Nicholls (1909–1985) and daughter Doris Lillian Nicholls (1899–1990).

His younger brother, Gilbert Nicholls, was also a very fine player.

== Death ==
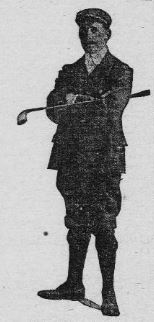
Nicholls, c. 1900

Bernard Nicholls died at Jefferson Hospital in Philadelphia, Pennsylvania, on 3 November 1924 due to septic meningitis. Interment was at Northwood Cemetery.

== Results in major championships ==
Tournament	1896	1897	1898	1899	1900	1901	1902	1903	1904	1905	1906	1907	1908	1909	1909	1910
U.S. Open	?	T4	T8	17	?	T5	28	19	T4	T20	T11	T8	?	?	?	?
The Open Championship	T46	T35	DNP	DNP	DNP	DNP	DNP	DNP	DNP	DNP	DNP	DNP	DNP	T10	WD	CUT

Note: Nicholls never played in the Masters Tournament, founded in 1934, nor the PGA Championship.

CUT = Missed the half-way cut
DNP = Did not play
WD = Withdrew
"T" = Tied for a place
Yellow background for top-10
