= Onwentsia Club =

Golf course in Lake Forest, Illinois, US

- Onwentsia Club logo

- Location within the United States Location within Illinois
- 42.243°N 87.843°W

Club information
- Location: Lake Forest, Illinois, U.S.
- Elevation: 700 feet (215 m)
- Established: 1895; 131 years ago
- Type: Private
- Total holes: 18
- Tournaments: 1906 U.S. Open
- Website: onwentsiaclub.org
- Designed by: Charles B. Macdonald; Herbert J. Tweedie redesign by Tom Doak
- Par: 71
- Length: 6,645 yards (6,076 m)
- Course rating: 72.8
- Slope rating: 134

Onwentsia Club is an 18-hole golf course in the central United States, located in Lake Forest, Illinois, a suburb north of Chicago.

== Course history ==
In Lake County, the par-71 course is 6,645 yards (6,076 m) from the back tees; it has a course rating of 72.8 with a slope rating of 134, on Chicago (bent) grass. Charles B. Macdonald designed the first nine holes in 1895; the second nine was designed in 1898 by Herbert J. Tweedie, James Foulis and Robert Foulis. The course was subsequently redesigned by Tom Doak.

In 1906, the club secured the services of the great Willie Anderson who had been pro at The Apawamis Club. Anderson remains the only golfer to win 3 consecutive US Opens.

== 1906 U.S. Open ==
Onwentsia Club hosted the U.S. Open 120 years ago in 1906, won by Alex Smith.

== Tom Doak redesign ==
The club has panoramic views of the property at almost all points, and the Doak redesign keeps the integrity of some holes intact. The fescue and multi-tiered putting surfaces compensate for length on this gem. The name "Onwentsia” meant a meeting place - in the country - of sporting braves and squaws.
