= Golf, Illinois =

- Village
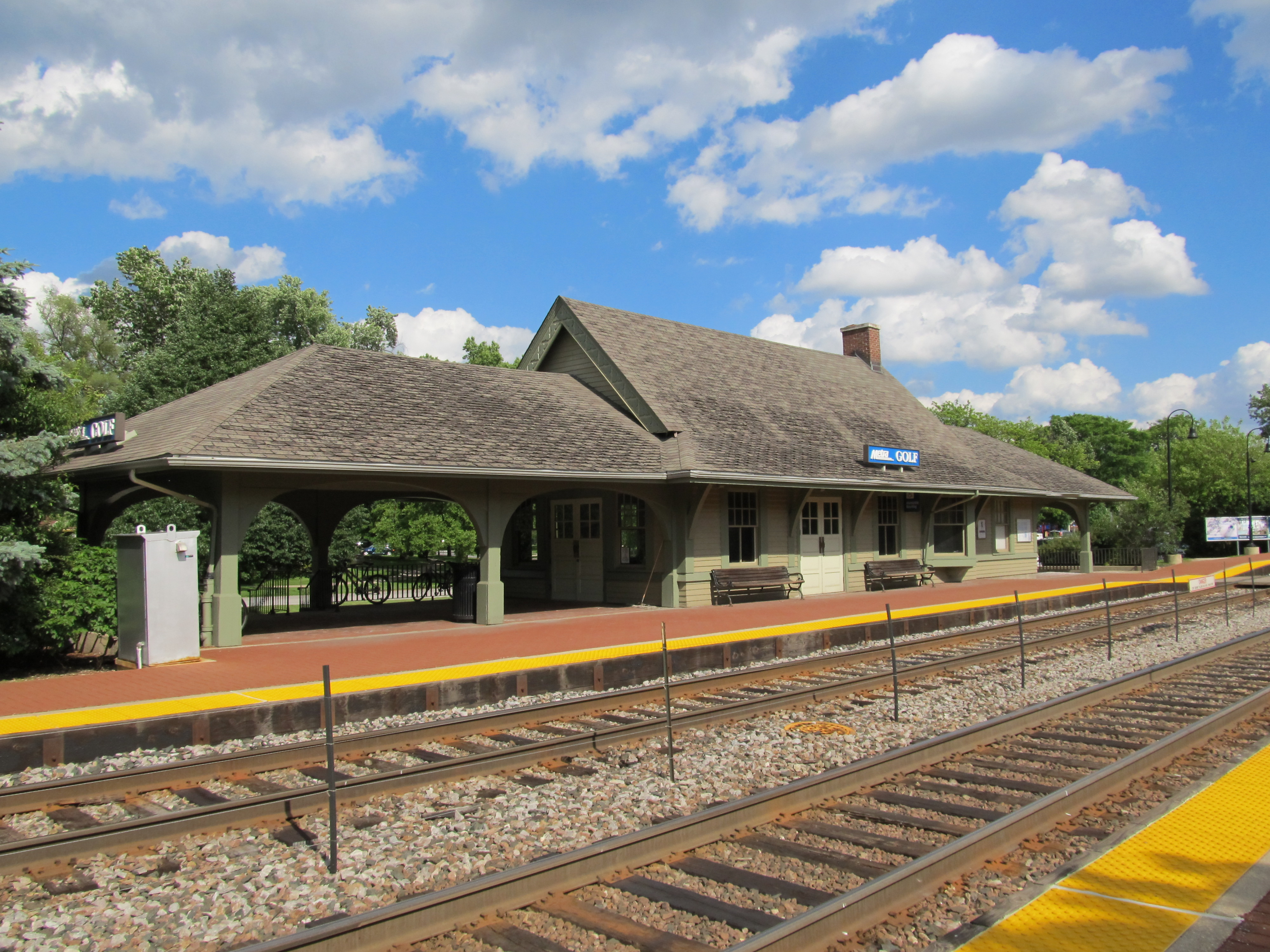
- Golf station

- logo

- Location in Cook County and the state of Illinois

- Location within Greater Chicago Location within Illinois Location within the United States
- Coordinates: 42°03′27″N 87°47′31″W
- Country: United States
- State: Illinois
- County: Cook County
- Settled: 1830s
- Incorporated: 1928

Area
  - Total: 0.45 sq mi (1.16 km^{2})
  - Land: 0.45 sq mi (1.16 km^{2})
  - Water: 0 sq mi (0.00 km^{2})

Population (2020)
  - Total: 514
  - Density: 1,146/sq mi (442.6/km^{2})
- Time zone: UTC-6 (CST)
  - Summer (DST): UTC-5 (CDT)
- ZIP Code(s): 60029
- FIPS code: 17-30328
- Website: villageofgolf.us

Golf is a village in Cook County, Illinois, United States, incorporated in 1928. As of the 2020 census, the village had a population of 514. The community is primarily residential, and has a dedicated police department, post office, and Metra train stop.

== History ==
The village of Golf occupies approximately half a square mile in Cook County, Illinois, roughly 17 miles (27 km) northwest of the Loop.

The land which is now the village was originally inhabited by Chippewa, Ottawa, and Potawatomi peoples. It was designated for their settlement in the August 1825 First Treaty of Prairie du Chien.

Around 1830, John Dewes purchased 400 acres (160 ha) for 50 cents an acre from Antoine Ouilmette and became the first non-Indian settler in what is now Golf. Dewes first built a log cabin, then in 1834 he built a brick house - a mansion at the time. Both structures remain on the grounds of what is now the Glen View Club.

In 1897, the Glen View Club bought a portion of the Dewes land and built an 18-hole golf course.

Around 1899, one member, Albert J. Earling, President of the Chicago, Milwaukee and St. Paul Railroad, started taking his private rail car from his offices downtown to golf at the Glen View Golf Club. He would tell people he was "going to golf." Earling arranged to have his car switched to a special siding at what is now the Golf train station. Other members began using Earling's siding, and it soon became a regular stop known as the "golf stop". The siding remained until it was salvaged during World War II to reclaim the steel tracks for use in the war effort, according to residents of Golf at that time.

In 1925 Edward R. Diederich, a Chicago businessman, wanted to buy an acre of land near the Glen View Golf Club to build a country home. He found that in order to get the site he wanted, he would have to purchase a 30-acre (12 ha) tract that was being sold to close an estate. The 30 acres extended from the Golf train station to the Glen View Golf Club boundary. Diederich chose to purchase the land, and had it laid out with winding streets and big lots. He installed sewer, water, gas, and electricity, paved streets, sidewalks, and installed electric street lights. The village of Golf was incorporated in 1928. The Glen View Club was originally outside of Golf village limits until annexation c. 1975.

== Geography ==
According to the 2010 census, Golf has a total area of 0.45 square miles (1.17 km^{2}), all land.

== Demographics ==
Historical population
Census	Pop.	Note	%±
1930	112		—
1940	158		41.1%
1950	258		63.3%
1960	409		58.5%
1970	504		23.2%
1980	482		−4.4%
1990	454		−5.8%
2000	451		−0.7%
2010	500		10.9%
2020	514		2.8%
U.S. Decennial Census; 2010 2020

As of the 2020 census there were 514 people, 167 households, and 137 families residing in the village. The population density was 1,147.32 inhabitants per square mile (442.98/km^{2}). There were 168 housing units at an average density of 375.00 per square mile (144.79/km^{2}). The racial makeup of the village was 83.46% White, 1.36% African American, 0.19% Native American, 5.64% Asian, 0.00% Pacific Islander, 3.50% from other races, and 5.84% from two or more races. Hispanic or Latino of any race were 6.81% of the population.

There were 167 households, out of which 35.3% had children under the age of 18 living with them, 80.24% were married couples living together, 1.80% had a female householder with no husband present, and 17.96% were non-families. 17.37% of all households were made up of individuals, and 16.77% had someone living alone who was 65 years of age or older. The average household size was 3.32 and the average family size was 2.92.

The village's age distribution consisted of 27.4% under the age of 18, 5.2% from 18 to 24, 14.4% from 25 to 44, 34.7% from 45 to 64, and 18.2% who were 65 years of age or older. The median age was 46.8 years. For every 100 females, there were 115.3 males. For every 100 females age 18 and over, there were 105.4 males.

The median income for a household in the village was $201,875, and the median income for a family was $240,313. Males had a median income of $126,250 versus $66,250 for females. The per capita income for the village was $92,636. No families and 3.5% of the population were below the poverty line, including none of those under age 18 and 15.8% of those age 65 or over.

As of 2022, the population was 546, the median age was 50.1, the median income per household was $228,750, and the poverty rate was 3.66%.

Golf village, Illinois – Racial and ethnic composition Note: the US Census treats Hispanic/Latino as an ethnic category. This table excludes Latinos from the racial categories and assigns them to a separate category. Hispanics/Latinos may be of any race.
Race / Ethnicity (NH = Non-Hispanic)	Pop 2000	Pop 2010	Pop 2020	% 2000	% 2010	% 2020
White alone (NH)	444	431	428	98.45%	86.20%	83.27%
Black or African American alone (NH)	0	3	7	0.00%	0.60%	1.36%
Native American or Alaska Native alone (NH)	0	0	0	0.00%	0.00%	0.00%
Asian alone (NH)	4	15	29	0.89%	3.00%	5.64%
Pacific Islander alone (NH)	0	0	0	0.00%	0.00%	0.00%
Other race alone (NH)	0	2	3	0.00%	0.40%	0.58%
Mixed race or Multiracial (NH)	0	8	12	0.00%	1.60%	2.33%
Hispanic or Latino (any race)	3	41	35	0.67%	8.20%	6.81%
Total	451	500	514	100.00%	100.00%	100.00%

== Education ==
Golf School was built in 1927, just south of the village, at a location that would become 9401 Waukegan Road in Morton Grove. At the time it was a prototypical country school house - a wooden structure with four rooms, no electricity, and no running water. A 1930s Works Progress Administration project constructed a large brick structure east of the original building. Up until the early 1980s, public school students from Golf attended Golf Elementary School (K-5), Golf Junior High School, and Niles North High School. After three years of legal wrangling, in February 1982, Golf detached from School District 67, and was attached to Glenview School District 34. As demographics changed in the late 1970s and early 1980s, Golf residents chose to align with the more upscale school districts in Glenview. More than two-thirds of the registered voters in the detachment area (village of Golf and the adjacent Golf Acres subdivision of the village of Glenview) signed the petition to detach from Niles Township High School District 219 and to attach to Northfield Township High School District 225. The Cook County Regional Board of School Trustees granted the petition in the 1980s.

Currently students from Golf attending public school go to Lyon School, Pleasant Ridge School, Springman Middle School (Glenview School District 34), and Glenbrook South High School (District 225).

== Transportation ==
Golf is connected to Chicago's transportation network.

=== Roads ===
Interstate Highways:

- Edens Expressway
- Tri-State Tollway

Illinois State Routes:

- Waukegan Road
- Golf Road

=== Public Transit ===
Golf is served by the Metra Milwaukee District North Line, and Pace suburban bus routes 208 and 210.
