= Gilbert Nicholls =

English-American professional golfer (1878–1950)

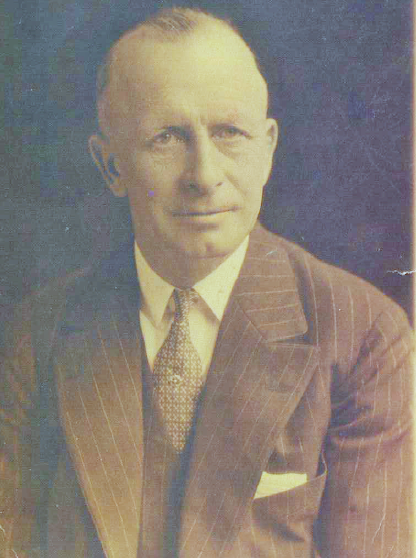
- Nicholls, c. 1945

Personal information
- Full name: Gilbert Ernest Nicholls
- Nationality: England; United States
- Born: July 23, 1878 Dover, Kent, England
- Died: January 17, 1950 (aged 71) Great Neck, New York, U.S.
- Spouses: Mary Agnes Gately (1878–1927); Eleanor C. Watson-Moshier (1897–1989)
- Children: 5

Career
- Sport: Golf
- Status: Professional
- Former tour: PGA Tour
- Professional wins: 12+

Number of wins by tour
- PGA Tour: 5

Best results in major championships
- PGA Championship: T33: 1922
- U.S. Open: 2nd: 1904, 1907
- The Open Championship: T13: 1924

Gilbert Ernest Nicholls (July 23, 1878 – January 17, 1950) was an English-American professional golfer, prominent in the late 19th and early 20th centuries. He had eight top-10 finishes in the U.S. Open.

== Career ==
Nicholls was born in Dover, Kent, England on July 23, 1878, to Frank Nicholls (1851–1930) and Lois Elizabeth Cordrey (1855–1935).

After working in Cannes, France, the two Nicholls brothers emigrated to the United States in 1897 and 1898, when golf was growing rapidly in North America. He had an older brother Bernard (also known as Ben), also an excellent competitive golfer, who posted five top-10 finishes in the U.S. Open between 1897 and 1907, although Gilbert eventually compiled the better record of the two.

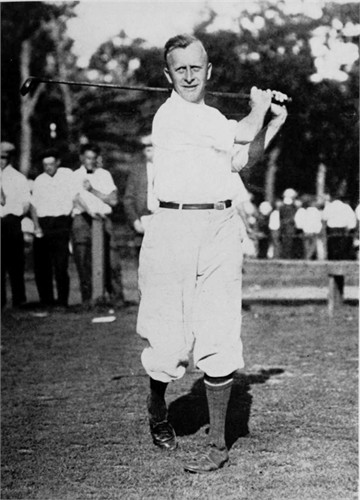
Nicholls, c. 1937

Bernard Nicholls, then playing out of the Boston area, earned the distinction of twice defeating Harry Vardon, then the top player in the world, head-to-head, on Vardon's 1900 tour of the United States and Canada; those were the only head-to-head matches Vardon lost on that tour.

The first match was on February 17, 1900, at Ormond Beach, Florida, when he soundly defeated the British star 5 and 4; and the second was at the Brae Burn Country Club near Boston on 13 October 1900 when he won 2 up in a 36-hole match.

The Nicholls brothers worked as club professionals and also sold golf clubs under the "Nicholls Brothers" and later "Butchart-Nicholls" brands. Gilbert worked at clubs in Lexington, Massachusetts, St. Louis, Missouri, Denver, Colorado, Wilmington, Delaware, Beaumont, Texas, and finally Great Neck, New York.

=== Competitive record ===
Nicholls is officially credited with five PGA Tour victories for his career, along with one third-place finish; he placed 15 times in the top-10 and 24 times in the top-25.

As well, he finished as runner-up in two U.S. Opens, in 1904 and 1907; he had a total of eight U.S. Open finishes in the top-10. He would have had a ninth, a T-5 in 1908, but he was disqualified for signing an incorrect scorecard. Among tournaments Nicholls won are included the 1909 and 1912 Philadelphia Open Championships, the 1911 and 1915 Metropolitan Opens, the 1911 and 1914 North and South Opens, the 1912 Florida Open, and the 1924 Maine Open. He is also listed as having won PGA Tour events in 1917 and 1921.

=== Memorable matches ===
Nicholls teamed twice with the legendary Willie Anderson, a World Golf Hall of Fame member who won four U.S. Opens, in 36-hole exhibition matches shortly before Anderson died in late October 1910. On October 21, Nicholls and Anderson lost to Jock Hutchison and Peter Robertson at a Pittsburgh club. Two days later, Nicholls and Anderson teamed again at the Allegheny Country Club in Sewickley, Pennsylvania, and lost on the final hole to two top-flight amateur players: William C. Fownes (then U.S. Amateur champion) and Eben Byers (1906 Amateur champion). This was Anderson's final match; he tired noticeably as the match progressed and died two days later at his home in Philadelphia at age 31.

In 1913 Vardon again toured North America and, teaming with Ted Ray, barnstormed the continent prior to the U.S. Open. In the first match of the tour, the two Englishmen met the Nicholls brothers in Philadelphia, and defeated them over 18 holes with a medal score of 68.

=== Golf club shaft patent ===
On April 26, 1927, Nicholls was awarded United States Patent No. 1,626,476. His invention was intended to improve the construction of wooden golf shafts by laminating different types of wood together; in the case of his invention it was a plurality of bamboo and hickory woods. When steel shafts became available in the early 1930s, Nicholls' invention quickly became obsolete.

== Personal life ==
Nicholls married Mary Agnes Gately (1878–1927) on May 14, 1901, in Roxbury, Massachusetts. They had five children, four boys and one girl. When his wife Mary died at the relatively young age of 48, Nicholls remarried to Eleanor "Ella" Catherine Moshier, née Watson (1897–1989) on January 7, 1929, in Miami, Florida. He met Mary Gately when he was lodging with the Lewis Tapley family in 1900 shortly after arriving in the United States. The Tapley's were Mary Gately's aunt and uncle.

Nicholls died on January 17, 1950, in Great Neck, New York.

== Tournament wins ==
Note: This list is incomplete.

- 1909 Philadelphia Open Championship
- 1911 Metropolitan Open, Florida Open, North and South Open
- 1912 Philadelphia Open Championship
- 1914 North and South Open
- 1915 Metropolitan Open, Shawnee Open
- 1921 New England PGA Championship
- 1922 New England PGA Championship
- 1924 Maine Open
- 1927 Florida West Coast Open

== Results in major championships ==
Tournament	1898	1899	1900	1901	1902	1903	1904	1905	1906	1907	1908	1909
U.S. Open	T23	T18	?	T14	T18	T15	2	T7	T8	2	DQ	17
The Open Championship												

Tournament	1910	1911	1912	1913	1914	1915	1916	1917	1918	1919	1920	1921	1922	1923	1924
U.S. Open	T5	T5	?	?	?	T10	T4	NT	NT	T16	T23	?	?	?	?
The Open Championship						NT	NT	NT	NT	NT					T13
PGA Championship	NYF	NYF	NYF	NYF	NYF	NYF		NT	NT				R64		

Note: Nicholls never played in the Masters Tournament, founded in 1934.

Top 10
Did not play

NYF = Tournament not yet founded
NT = No tournament
DQ = Disqualified
"T" indicates a tie for a place
R64, R32, R16, QF, SF = Round in which player lost in PGA Championship match play

Sources: U.S. Open, Open Championship, PGA Championship
