= Charlie Bolling =

American professional golfer (born 1957)

Personal information
- Full name: Charles Lanier Bolling Jr.
- Nationality: United States
- Born: November 15, 1957 (age 68) Rosemont, Pennsylvania, U.S.
- Height: 5 ft 9 in (175 cm)
- Weight: 150 lb (68 kg)
- Children: 1

Career
- Sport: Golf
- College: Duke University
- Turned professional: 1981
- Former tours: PGA Tour; European Tour; Sunshine Tour; European Senior Tour
- Professional wins: 14

Number of wins by tour
- Sunshine Tour: 1
- Other: 13

Best results in major championships
- Masters Tournament: DNP
- PGA Championship: DNP
- U.S. Open: CUT: 1983, 1984, 1987, 1988
- The Open Championship: CUT: 1983, 1984, 1989

Achievements and awards
- TPS leading money winner: 1984

Charles Lanier Bolling Jr. (born November 15, 1957) is an American professional golfer. Early in his career Bolling had much success, winning six significant amateur events in the mid-Atlantic region, including the 1980 Pennsylvania Amateur. Shortly after graduating from Duke University in 1981, Bolling attempted to earn membership on the PGA Tour. However, he was unsuccessful for three consecutive years at Q-school. In the interim he played overseas, culminating with a win at the 1983 South African Open. In late 1984, Bolling earned PGA Tour membership. He played on the PGA Tour for four seasons in the mid-1980s but did not record many high results, never coming close to winning and only recording four top-10s. Since 1990, Bolling has worked primarily as a club professional in the northeastern United States.

== Early life ==
Bolling was born in Rosemont, Pennsylvania, in suburban Philadelphia. Bolling started to play some golf at the age of 10 but did not take the game seriously until he was 14. Baseball was his big sport growing up. At the age of 15, however, he began to focus on golf. His parents belonged to a country club which, Bolling later stated, helped him easily segue into golf. They were members Gulph Mills Golf Club in King of Prussia, Pennsylvania. At Gulph Mills, Bolling worked with head pro Willie Scholl who, in Bolling's words, "taught me how to play."

== Amateur career ==
Bolling attended Duke University. In the summer of 1978 he won the Philadelphia Amateur. In October, Bolling played the Grandfather Mountain Invitational Golf Tournament at Grandfather Mountain, North Carolina. In the first round he shot a 73, leading Duke to a 297 total, six in front of the favored team of Wake Forest University. In the second and final round, however, Bolling shot a higher score to finish outside of the top four. Duke's team, however, finished in solo second place, only behind Wake Forest. Later in the academic year, in April 1979, Bolling played well at the ACC Championship in Greensboro, North Carolina. At the end of the first round, Bolling was tied for third place with a 69, three back of leader Robert Wrenn of Wake Forest. As a team, "surprising" Duke was in second place at 371, six back of University of North Carolina at Chapel Hill. However, Bolling would shoot significantly over-par for the rest of the tournament and finished outside of the individual top 5. Duke's team finished in solo third place, 18 strokes behind the champions, Wake Forest. In the summer of 1979, however, Bolling had, in his words, "swing problems," and did not record many high results. To resolve the problems Bolling moved to Fort Lauderdale, Florida and worked with swing instructor Lew Worsham. He did not return to college in the fall. Bolling later stated, "That period was important to my progress. I made some critical swing changes."

In the summer of 1980, Bolling began to play better. In July, he played the Pennsylvania Amateur. The event was four rounds long. Over the course of the first two rounds Bolling was at 142 (+2). This good score earn him the right to play in the final group on the two-round final day. He played with Frank Furher and Dick von Tacky. However, Furher was sick for most of the final day and withdrew on the 7th hole of the final round. Only Bolling and von Tacky remained in the final group. Bolling had a sizable lead over von Tacky for most of the day. However, von Tacky played excellently on the final round's front nine and after a 25-foot birdie putt on the 8th hole he took the solo lead. Bolling then bogeyed the 11th and 12th holes to fall further behind. However, Bolling came back with birdies on the next two holes. Meanwhile, von Tacky bogeyed the 14th to fall back into a tie and then made a three-putt bogey on the 15th hole. Bolling now had the lead. Bolling was in trouble on the 16th hole, however, stuck in a fairway bunker. He hit a "marvelous" recovery shot, though, to 12 feet. He made the par putt. He remained one ahead entering the final hole. Bolling played the hole poorly but von Tacky "missed a nine-footer for par that would have tied." Bolling's bogey won it by one. Overall, during the final day he closed with rounds of 71 (+1) to finish at 284 (+4). After the tournament he said, "That's the greatest experience I ever had in golf. I've never been in a more pressure situation. I never came to the 72nd hole on the winning side."

In the fall, Bolling returned to Duke. He was a fifth-year senior. In October, he played the Grandfather Mountain event. The event was three rounds long and held at Grandfather Country Club in Linville, North Carolina. He shot an even-par first round 72 to tie several players for the lead, including Mike Cook from the University of Georgia. In the second round both he and Cook again shot rounds of 72 and were now the only ones in the joint lead. In the final round, after 17 holes, Bolling was three-over-par and one back of Cook. However, Bolling made birdie while Cook bogeyed giving Bolling the win. During the fall, Bolling also won the intercollegiate events at Kingsmill and Guilford.

In March 1981, it was noted by Raleigh, North Carolina's The News and Observer that Bolling had "rapidly blossomed" over the course of the academic year. Duke coach Rod Myers said, "Charlie's really matured. He's a good planner on the course, and has the talent to be the ACC champion." In mid-March, he played the three-round Iron Duke Classic. After two rounds Bolling was at 145 (+3) for solo second, two back of leader Larry Penley of Clemson University. In the final round Bolling shot a one-under-par 70 to tie Penley at the end of regulation. However, Penley defeated Bolling on the first playoff hole. Duke's team finished in solo third. Later in the academic year, at golf's NCAA championships held in Palo Alto, California, Bolling finished in 8th place. The following month, in April, he played the three-round Tar Heel Invitational. Bolling led the individual event after two rounds at 138 (−6). He shot a final round 71 to win by five. Overall, Bolling won five events during the 1980-81 year at Duke. He earned second-team All-American honors. In May 1981, Bolling graduated from Duke with degrees in Economics and History.

== Professional career ==
Bolling attempted to earn playing privileges for the PGA Tour in 1981 at the PGA Tour Qualifying Tournament. He was not successful. The following year he returned to q-school. At 1982 PGA Tour Qualifying School he missed graduating by one shot. In the ensuing years he played primarily overseas and on the Tournament Players Series (TPS), a satellite tour of the PGA Tour. During the southern hemisphere summer of 1982–83, Bolling played the Southern African Tour. His first tournament was the Gordon's Gin Classic. It was also first 72 hole tournament. He finished in 11th place. Later in the month, he won the country's national open, the Datsun SA Open, defeating Tertius Claassens by a shot. In addition, he defeated serious contenders Nick Price and Gary Player by multiple shots. He won US$14,000. He was the first American to win the event. Bolling ultimately finished in third place on South Africa's Order of Merit for the season.

As of April, Bolling began play on the Tournament Players Series. A month later, in May, he played the Chattanooga Classic. He opened at 133 (−9) to put him in a tie for second place, two behind leader George Cadle. In the third round he played well on the back nine. He eagled the par-5 11th and closed with a 15-foot birdie for a 68 (−3). He took a two-stroke lead entering the final round. However, Bolling played poorly in the final round, shooting a 75 (+4), to finish in a tie for eighth, four back of champion Jim Dent.

Later in the year he started play on the PGA European Tour. Bolling's good play in South Africa gave him an exemption for the tour. He recorded top-25 finishes in his first two events, the Scandinavian Enterprise Open and the State Express Classic. In his third event, the 1983 British Open, he opened well with a 71. However, he shot a second round 80 to miss the cut. After the British Open, Bolling did not play particularly well. In his final six events of the year, he made the cut in only two of them. In late 1983, Bolling attempted to earn membership for the PGA Tour at 1983 PGA Tour Qualifying School. It was his third attempt at q-school. He was not successful.

In early 1984 he played some events in the United States. In April he earned entrance into the Greater Greensboro Open. However, he missed the cut. In June he played the 1984 U.S. Open at Winged Foot Golf Club in Mamaroneck, New York. It was the second time he played the event. He led the field early in the tournament with a front nine 32 (−3). He ultimately shot a first round 72 (+2). However, he shot a second round 79 (+9) to miss the cut. Shortly thereafter, Bolling again played in Europe. On the European Tour he made the cut in four of nine events, with two top-25s.

Later in the 1984, Bolling would play on the Tournament Players Series as he had the previous year. In early September he played well the Everett Open. Bolling started the final round tied with England's Peter Oosterhuis, one back of the joint lead shared by Chi-Chi Rodríguez, Dave Stockton, and Ron Commans. Bolling opened well, holing putts from, respectively, 15 and 5 feet on the 2nd and 3rd holes to take the solo lead. He also hit wedge shots close on the par-3 8th and par-4 9th holes to assure birdies. He recorded a front nine 31 (−4) to take a three-shot lead over Stockton, Rodriguez, and Commans. He then birdied the 10th and 12th holes to "extend his lead to five shots." Though he had some troubles in the middle of the back nine, he drove the 280-yard par-4 16th hole to create an easy birdie and secure the win. He won $36,000. The following week he played the three-round Victorian Open in British Columbia. Bolling later stated, "I wanted to play respectable to show people my win in Everett was not a fluke." In the first round he shot a 66 (−4). In the second round he shot 63 (−7), tying the course record. He was at 129 (−11). This set the record for lowest two-round total on the Tournament Players Series. In the final round he shot a 69 (−1). He won the event. With his 198 (−12) total, he recorded the lowest three-round score on the TPS. With the win, he was virtually assured with an exemption into the following year's PGA Tour. He was the leading money winner on the Tournament Players Series and considered the tour's "hottest player." The following week, he played the final event of the season, the Anderson-Pacific Sacramento Golf Classic. Before the event, on September 11, he played "The Shootout," a pairs event. His partner was Bob Tway. In the nine hole tournament, his team shot three-under par to tie the team of Bob Charles and Russ Cochran for the win. Bolling earned $250 for the victory. Two days later Bolling played the event proper. Bolling's goal was to protect his money leader standing. He easily achieved this goal, finishing in third place, one out of a playoff. Due to his Order of Merit win he received PGA Tour membership for 1985.

In December he played the Chrysler Team Championship, with Brad Fabel. In the first two rounds they shot 66–64 to put themselves in a tie for ninth, three back. In the third round they shot an "impressive" 64 (−8) to take a one-shot lead. In the final round the team shot a 66 (−6) to finish tied with four other teams. At the first playoff hole, Fabel missed from eight feet and Bolling from 20 feet. The team of Raymond Floyd and Hal Sutton won the event.

In 1985, Bolling played on the PGA Tour for the first time. He made the cut in his first event, the Bob Hope Classic. However, he missed the cut or withdrew from 19 of his next 21 events. In his 23rd event, the Buick Open, he played better, however. He opened with a 67 (−5) to put him two back of the lead held by Rick Fehr, in a tie for third. He shot two-under-par over the next two rounds to put him in position for a high result. However, he shot a final round 75 (+3) to finish outside of the top-25. In his next three events he missed the cut. However, he played better at his final five events, making the cut in four of them, including three top-25s. He finished 150th on the money list. This was still not good enough to secure PGA Tour membership for the following year. He attended 1985 PGA Tour Qualifying School in an attempt to earn full-time status again. Bolling played well, recording a T-20 to regain membership. In December he again played well at the Chrysler Team Championship, recording another runner-up finish.

In 1986 he played his second season on the PGA Tour. He again opened the year poorly, with four straight missed cuts. However, he made the cut in his final event of the West Coast swing, recording a T-33. In early March he went on a streak, making the cut in four consecutive events, including a T-12 at the USF&G Classic. In late April he recorded a top ten at the Houston Open. It was the highest finish of his career so far. Roughly a month after that he played the Kemper Open. He opened with a 67 (−5) to put him three back of Fred Couples' lead. In the second round he birdied three of the last four holes. He recorded a 70 (−2) to take a one shot lead over a number of players. However, Bolling shot a second 77 (+5) to fall out of contention. He eventually finished in a tie for 23rd. Over the course of the summer, in his next nine events, Bolling made the cut in only four of them. However, he made the cut in his next eight events. The final event of the year he played was the Tallahassee Open. Over the course of the first three rounds, Bolling opened with a 212 (−4) total to put in a tie for 19th place. He shot a final round 69 (−3) to finish in a tie for 10th. It was the ninth straight cut he made. He finished 96th on the money list.

In 1987, Bolling opened the year with a top ten finish at the Bob Hope Chrysler Classic. He then made the cut in three of his final four events on the West Coast swing. However, he missed the cut in 10 of his next 15 events; when he did make the cut he did not record any top-25s. At his next event after this stretch, the Hardee's Golf Classic, he played much better. He opened with rounds of 67 (−3) an 65 (−5). This put him in a tie for fifth place, three back of the lead. However, he shot over-par in the final two rounds and finished T-30. The following week he played the Buick Open. During the second round, Bolling made a hole-in-one. He won the use of a car for a year. His was his fifth ace of his career. Despite the ace he missed the cut. The following week he played the Federal Express St. Jude Classic. Bolling shot a first round 67 (−5) to tie for second place, one back of the lead. In the second round, however, Bolling saw his score "soar" to an 81 (+9) and he missed the cut. At this point he was 131st on the money list, outside of the top 125 to automatically secure PGA Tour membership. In his last 12 events he made the cut in seven but only recorded one top-25, a T-14 at the Greater Milwaukee Open, and failed to move into the top 125 of the money list. He finished 128th on the money list.

In 1988, Bolling played his final season on the PGA Tour. He opened the season poorly, missing the cut in his first seven events. However, during this time period he managed to qualify for the 1988 U.S. Open. In the opening round of the event, held at The Country Club at Brookline, Massachusetts, he shot an 80 (+9). He shot a second round 74 (+3) and missed the cut by eight strokes. After the U.S. Open, Bolling made the cut in two of next three events, his first cuts made of the season. However, he failed to make the cut in his final eight events of the year. During the year, Bolling broke his arm in a "non-golfing accident" which severely "curtailed his career."

He still attempted to regain status on the PGA Tour. Bolling played the 1988 PGA Tour Qualifying School at The Woodlands Country Club in the suburbs of Houston, Texas. The top 37 players advanced to the finals. Bolling shot rounds of 73-73-71-75 to finish in a tie for 11th place, easily making it. In the six-round finals he opened well, with rounds of 70 and 71. In the third round, however, he fell back a little with a 74. In the final three rounds he finished with rounds of 76-76-81. He finished in last place and missed the qualifying cut-off by 16 strokes.

In 1989, Bolling elected to play overseas. In January he played a handful of events on the South African Tour and recorded a top ten at the South African Open. By February he had moved on to the European Tour. He made the cut in two of his first four events but did not record any high finishes, failing to record any top-25s. In his fifth event, however, the Volvo Open Championship, he took the joint lead with a first round 68 (−4). He shot even-par thereafter and finished in a tie for fifth. Overall, Bolling made the cut in 5 of 8 events with one top-ten.

=== Club professional ===
In 1990 Bolling began his career as a club professional. His first job was at a club in Vermont. As of April 1993, he was the assistant pro at Bent Creek Country Club at Lititz, Pennsylvania. He occasionally still received some media attention for his golf play. In October he played the Pro-Pro Scramble, a Philadelphia Section PGA event, with Brett Upper, the head pro at Bent Creek. The event was at Hershey Country Club. Bolling and Upper shot a 60 (−12) to tie the team of Gary Hardin and Wayne Phillips. Their team then won the event with a birdie on the first sudden-death playoff hole. In 1994, Bolling had a "quiet summer" in notable Pennsylvania golf events through the end of July. In early August, however, "he shot lights-out" to win the PGA Club Pro qualifier at Kennett Square Golf and Country Club. In September, he played the three-round Philadelphia PGA Section Championship at Conestoga Country Club in Lancaster, Pennsylvania. Bolling shot "an impressive opening-round 69." However, he scored four shots higher in the second round. "I hit the ball better today and my score was worse," Bolling said after the round. In the final round Bolling shot a 68 to finish in a tie for fifth, five back of champion Frank Dobbs.

In 1995, Bolling started work at Siwanoy Country Club in Bronxville, New York. In September, he played the three-round Izod Club/Cadillac Met PGA Championship at Quaker Ridge Golf Club in Scarsdale, New York. Bolling shot a second round 69 (−1), the round of the day, to put him one back of the lead. However, he shot a final round 76 (+6) to finish in a tie for fifth place. In 1996 he finished in joint second at the Metropolitan Open, only behind Bruce Zabriski.

In 1997, he began work at Fresh Meadow Country Club in Lake Success, New York. In June, Bolling played the PGA Club Professional Championship at Pinehurst No. 8. The top 25 players earned rights to play the 1997 PGA Championship which was going to be held in the state of New York. At 143 (−1), he made the halfway cut by five shots. In the third round he shot 73 (+1) to stay within the top 25. However, in the final round he shot a 77 (+5). At 293, he finished in a tie for 28th, missing the cut-off figure for the PGA Championship by a shot.

Shortly thereafter, Bolling received media attention for his "professionalism." In the late 1990s, Bolling started an annual benefit for the Met PGA junior programs. Bolling would play Fresh Meadows from dawn to dusk and members would pay for every par and every birdie he made. He explained to the New York Post on why he performed the benefit. "I wanted to do something for junior golf," he said. "I didn’t take the game up until I was 14 and I remember getting very excited about it very quickly. That led the pros who touched my life to want to help me out, and I’ve never forgotten that." In May 1999, Bolling played the MasterCard Long Island PGA Championship. In one his matches he played Rick Meskell. The match went into extra holes. Bolling's drive on the first extra hole went into the rough. Bolling cleaned some leaves near his ball. He then saw the ball move. He was the only person to see this. He was unsure if he had moved his ball but notified an official about it. It was deemed by the official that Bolling would be penalized. Bolling ultimately lost the hole and the match. However, because he went out of his way to notify an official about the potential infraction he was noted for his "professionalism" by Jeff Williams of Newsday.

Over the next few years Bolling had much success at prominent tri-state area events. In August 1999, he played the three-round Metropolitan Open. In the second round he shot a 68 (−3) to tie the lead. He ultimately finished in joint second place with Matt Cannon, behind Mark Brown. In July 2002 he played the three-round New York State Open at the Bethpage Black Course. He opened with a 70 (−1), the only player under-par. The course was described as almost as difficult as when it hosted the U.S. Open a month before. In the second round Bolling shot a 74 (+3) to fall into a tie for second with Mark Brown, one behind leader Rick Hartmann. In the final round, he shot three-over-par on the first two holes to fall "out of the mix." He ultimately shot a 78 (+7) to finish in solo fourth, three back of champion Brown. Two months later, in September 2002, Bolling played the Izod Lincoln Metropolitan PGA Championship. The event was held at the Country Club of Fairfield in Fairfield, Connecticut. Bolling opened with an even-par 70. He then shot a second round 66 (−4) to take the solo lead by one over John Reeves. He played poorly in the final round and was four-over-par after 17 holes. Most of his competitors played poorly though and he still had a one shot lead over Reeves entering the final hole. However, on the par-4 18th hole, Reeves made the green in regulation while Bolling's lop wedge approach spun off the green, 35 yards from the pin. Bolling though holed the chip shot for a birdie and a "dramatic" two shot win.

In 2003, Bolling was still the head pro at Fresh Meadows. During this era, he did not play particularly well at golf tournaments. By the end of the 2003 Met PGA season, Bolling was only 17th on the PGA's points list. He stated in mid-September, "My summer hasn't been very steady. The difference has been my putting. I haven't putted well." In 2004, Bolling attempted to qualify for the U.S. Open. However, he was unsuccessful at sectional qualifying, missing qualifying by four shots.

As of 2009, Bolling was still the head pro at Fresh Meadow. He started to play in senior Met PGA events. In May, he reached the semifinals of the Mastercard Senior Match Play Championship. In September, he recorded a joint runner-up at the Key Food Met PGA Senior Championship. In October, he won the Senior Treiber Memorial Tournament of Champions. In 2011, he won the event again.

In 2012, he started playing some events on the European Senior Tour. He played in five events, including the Senior Open Championship, but did not have much success, failing to record anything better than a T-41. In late 2012, however, he had some success back on the Met PGA, finishing runner-up at the Met PGA Senior Championship and recording a victory at the Senior Treiber Memorial Tournament of Champions for the third time. Later in the year, he attempted to qualify for the Senior PGA TOUR at their q-school. However, he finished in a tie for 66th place, at 300 (+12), and did not move on.

In 2015 he won twice on Senior Met PGA. He won the Polo Golf Met PGA Head Professional Championship and the Senior Treiber Memorial Tournament of Champions for the fourth time.

In 2016 he won the Met PGA Team Championship, a pairs event, with teammate Bill Van Orman. In 2017 he won the Polo Golf Met PGA Head Professional Championship for the second time.

In May 2018, Bolling had success at the Mastercard Met PGA Senior Match Play Championship. The event was at Rolling Hills Country Club in Wilton, Connecticut. He got through the Round of 16. He then defeated Jeff Warne and Darrell Kestner, respectively, in the quarterfinals and semifinals. However, in the finals he lost to Frank Bensel 1 up. The following week he successfully defended his Polo Golf Met PGA Head Professional Championship. It was his third win in the event.

In May 2019, he played in the Senior PGA Championship, a major championship on the Senior PGA Tour. However, he opened with a 77 (+7) to put himself 11 shots back. He then shot a second round 86 (+16) to miss the cut. In 2021 he played in the same event. However, he again missed the cut by a wide margin.

As of 2021, he was still playing Senior Met events.

== Personal life ==
In September 1992, Bolling got married. In the summer of 1999, his son Jacob was born.

== Amateur wins ==
- 1978 Philadelphia Amateur
- 1980 Pennsylvania Amateur, Grandfather Mountain intercollegiate, Kingsmill intercollegiate, Guilford intercollegiate
- 1981 Tar Heel Invitational

== Professional wins (14) ==
=== Southern Africa Tour wins (1) ===
No.	Date	Tournament	Winning score	Margin of victory	Runner-up
1	Jan 29, 1983	Datsun South African Open	−10 (71-67-69-71=278)	1 stroke	(South Africa) Tertius Claassens

=== Tournament Players Series wins (2) ===
No.	Date	Tournament	Winning score	Margin of victory	Runner-up
1	Sep 3, 1984	Everett Open	−15 (70-66-67-66=269)	4 strokes	(England) Peter Oosterhuis
2	Sep 9, 1984	PEZ Victoria Open	−12 (66-63-69=198)	2 strokes	(United States) Terry Snodgrass

=== Pennsylvania PGA Section wins (1) ===
- 1993 Pro-Pro Scramble (with Brett Upper)

=== Met PGA Section wins (5) ===
- 2002 Izod Lincoln Metropolitan PGA Championship
- 2015 Polo Golf Met PGA Head Professional Championship,
- 2016 Met PGA Team Championship (with Bill Van Orman)
- 2017 Polo Golf Met PGA Head Professional Championship
- 2018 Polo Golf Met PGA Head Professional Championship

=== Senior Met PGA Sections wins (4) ===
- 2009 Senior Treiber Memorial Tournament of Champions
- 2011 Senior Treiber Memorial Tournament of Champions
- 2012 Senior Treiber Memorial Tournament of Champions
- 2015 Senior Treiber Memorial Tournament of Champions

== Results in major championships ==
Tournament	1983	1984	1985	1986	1987	1988	1989
U.S. Open	CUT	CUT			CUT	CUT	
The Open Championship	CUT	CUT					CUT

Did not play

CUT = missed the halfway cut
Note: Bolling never played in the Masters Tournament or the PGA Championship.

== Results in The Players Championship ==
Tournament	1986	1987
The Players Championship	T21	CUT

"T" = Tied
CUT = missed the halfway cut

== See also ==
- 1985 PGA Tour Qualifying School graduates
