= Jason Caron =

American professional golfer (born 1972)

Personal information
- Nationality: United States
- Born: July 25, 1972 (age 54) Hyannis, Massachusetts, U.S.
- Height: 5 ft 11 in (1.80 m)
- Weight: 170 lb (77 kg; 12 st)

Career
- Sport: Golf
- College: Charleston Southern University
- Turned professional: 1994
- Current tour: PGA Tour Champions
- Former tours: PGA Tour; Nationwide Tour; NGA Hooters Tour
- Professional wins: 10

Best results in major championships
- Masters Tournament: DNP
- PGA Championship: CUT: 2019, 2020
- U.S. Open: T30: 2002
- The Open Championship: DNP

Achievements and awards
- PGA Professional Player of the Year: 2020

Jason Caron (born July 25, 1972) is an American professional golfer and former PGA Tour player.

== Early life and amateur career ==
Caron was born in Hyannis, Massachusetts and attended Charleston Southern University.

He was runner-up at the 1994 New England Amateur, two strokes behind Mark Plummer.

== Professional career ==
Caron turned professional in 1994 and joined the NGA Hooters Tour, where he was runner-up at the 1998 Ronald McDonald House Classic, 3 strokes behind Darron Stiles. In 1999 he won three tournaments.

He played on the Nationwide Tour between 2001 and 2009, where he was runner-up at the 2002 Arkansas Classic, a stroke behind Jace Bugg.

Caron played on the PGA Tour in 2000 and 2003 after earning his card through Q-School. His best finishes were a tied 19th at the 2000 Honda Classic, and tied 15th at the 2003 AT&T Pebble Beach National Pro-Am. He finished tied 30th at the 2002 U.S. Open at Bethpage Black Course.

In 2020 he won the Long Island Open. He was runner-up at the Long Island PGA Championship in 2023 and 2024.

Caron joined the PGA Tour Champions in 2024. In 2025, he lost a playoff to Steven Alker at the Cologuard Classic and was runner-up to Stephen Allan at Dick's Open.

Caron is also the head professional at Mill River Club on Long Island, and was named the 2020 PGA Professional Player of the Year.

== Professional wins (10) ==
=== NGA Hooters Tour wins (3) ===
- 1999 Casino Strip Resorts Classic, Coors Light Classic, Budweiser Classic

=== Other wins (7) ===
- 1995 Hilton Head Championship (Hurricane Tour)
- 2012 Connecticut Open
- 2017 PGA Stroke Play Championship
- 2018 Metropolitan PGA Championship
- 2020 PGA Stroke Play Championship, Long Island Open, Metropolitan PGA Championship

== Playoff record ==
Buy.com Tour playoff record (0–1)

No.	Year	Tournament	Opponents	Result
1	2001	Buy.com Gila River Classic	(United States) Ben Crane, (United States) Bo Van Pelt	Eliminated by par on second hole. Crane won with birdie on fourth extra.

PGA Tour Champions playoff record (0–1)

No.	Year	Tournament	Opponent	Result
1	2025	Cologuard Classic	(New Zealand) Steven Alker	Lost to birdie on first extra hole

== Results in major championships ==
Tournament	2002	2003	2004	2005	2006	2007	2008	2009	2010	2011	2012	2013	2014	2015	2016	2017	2018	2019	2020
U.S. Open	T30																		
PGA Championship																		CUT	CUT

Note: Caron never played in the Masters Tournament nor The Open Championship.

Did not play

CUT = missed 36 hole cut
"T" = tied

== Results in senior major championships ==
Tournament	2024	2025	2026
Senior PGA Championship	T4	T4	T12
The Tradition			
U.S. Senior Open	CUT	T9	T20
Senior Players Championship		T30	T11
Senior British Open Championship		T40	T55

Top 10

CUT = missed the halfway cut
"T" indicates a tie for a place

== U.S. national team appearances ==
- PGA Cup: 2019 (winners)
- World Champions Cup: 2025

== See also ==
- 1999 PGA Tour Qualifying School graduates
- 2002 PGA Tour Qualifying School graduates
