= Rick Hartmann =

American professional golfer (born 1959)

Personal information
- Full name: Richard Hartmann
- Nickname: "The Big Pro"
- Nationality: United States
- Born: December 23, 1958 Bridgehampton, New York, U.S.
- Died: August 5, 2025 (aged 66) Sag Harbor, New York, U.S.

Career
- Sport: Golf
- Turned professional: 1980
- Former tours: European Tour; Southern Africa Tour
- Professional wins: 26

Number of wins by tour
- Sunshine Tour: 1
- Other: 25

Best results in major championships
- Masters Tournament: DNP
- PGA Championship: CUT: 2002
- U.S. Open: T46: 2000
- The Open Championship: T62: 1984

Achievements and awards
- Met PGA Player of the Year: 2000, 2001

Richard Hartmann (December 23, 1958 – August 5, 2025) was an American professional golfer. Hartmann turned pro in the early 1980s and tried out for the PGA Tour several times during this era. However, he was unsuccessful and decided to play in Europe. Hartmann played on the European Tour for 10 years and recorded a number of high finishes. However, the general consensus was that he had "mixed success" as his performance was erratic and he failed to win. In 1994, he quit life as a touring professional and started working as a club pro on Long Island. Hartmann also played on the local club pro circuit, the Met PGA, with incredible success, winning every significant tournament, and was generally regarded as one of the "finest club pros" in the country during the era.

== Early life ==
Hartmann was born in Bridgehampton, New York and grew up in Huntington, New York on Long Island. His parents were Larry and Dorothy and he has two brothers. In the late 1960s, when Hartmann was still a kid, his family moved from New York to Florida.

At the age of 14, Hartmann started playing golf. He immediately caught "golf fever" and played nearly every day for the next two years. Hartmann attended Hudson High School in Hudson, Florida. However, he eventually stopped attending school during the day, practicing golf exclusively during the mornings and afternoons while taking night classes in an effort to earn his diploma. Hartmann played out of Beacon Woods Golf Club in Bayonet Point, Florida. Early in his career, he broke the Beacon Woods course record with a 65. In 1976, he also won Beacon Woods' club championship.

== Amateur career ==
In 1976, while still an amateur, Hartmann won his first professional tournaments, the Jimmy Mann County Golf Tournament and the Continental Invitational.

During this period, Hartmann started attending Brevard Community College. He attended the school for one year, for the 1977–78 academic year, and "played sparingly" on the golf team. During this era, he was considered one of the "North Suncoast's top amateurs." In June, he played the three-round Pasco Times Men's Amateur Golf Tournament. The event was at his home course and he was considered "the local favorite." In the final round, Hartmann shot a three-under-par 69, the "tournament's low round," to finish solo second, three behind champion Rick Powers. "I think I played about as well as I could today," he said after the round.

== Professional career ==
As of 1980, Hartmann had turned professional. In May, he tried out for the U.S. Open at Bent Tree at Gator Creek. Hartmann shot round of 71 and 75 and qualified by three shots. He was scheduled to compete in sectional qualifying at the Atlanta Athletic Club in June. Hartmann, however, failed to make it through sectional qualifying. During this era, he was thinking about playing on the European Tour. "I enjoy playing, whether it's on the tour here or in Europe," he told the Tampa Bay Times. "In fact, I would enjoy going to Europe to play. The travel would be great, and the competition there might not be as tough."

In the early 1980s, he played a number of state opens across the country in an effort to prepare himself for PGA Tour tryouts. In 1982, Hartmann recorded a top ten at the Florida Open. The following year, he again recorded a top ten at the event. In July 1983, he played the New Hampshire Open. Hartmann shot rounds of 69 and 71 to finish joint second, one back of champion Frank Fuhrer. A few months later, in September, Hartmann played the North Dakota Open. Hartmann finished in tie for third, five back of champion Barney Thompson.

In 1983, Hartmann began attempts to qualify for the PGA Tour. In October, he played the Indiana Regional qualifier at the Golf Club of Indiana in Lebanon, Indiana. In his words, he "missed by a bunch." In November, Hartmann decided to play another regional qualifier, the PGA North Florida qualifier, in attempts to make it onto the PGA Tour. In the third round he shot a 66 (−6), the "best round of the day," to move within one of leader Steve Hart. He finished with a 67 to finish at 271 (−17) and earned medalist honors by six shots. He earned the rights to the play the final qualifying school at TPC at Sawgrass later in the month. However, Hartmann was unsuccessful at final qualifying; it was the second time he was unsuccessful at qualifying.

=== European Tour ===
In 1984, Hartmann started playing overseas. Early in the year, he played the six-event South African Tour. During the first five weeks of the season, Hartmann won roughly $10,000. At his final event, he played the Swazi Sun Pro-Am. Hartmann opened with three rounds in the 60s to put him near the lead. In the final round, due to an "excellent final nine" he defeated Teddy Webber by a shot. Shortly thereafter, Hartmann began playing on the European Tour. His first event was at the Timex Open at Biarritz Golf Club in Spain. Hartmann played well, shooting in the 60s every day to finish in a tie for sixth. Later in the season he played the 1984 Open Championship at the St Andrews. Hartmann opened with a 70 to put him in the top ten, tied with Lee Trevino and Lanny Wadkins. He followed with a 73 to make the cut. However, he "had problems the last two days," shooting rounds of 76 and 77, and finished well back. Overall, in his first tour of Europe, Hartmann made the cut in five of seven events with one top ten. Later in the year, Hartmann returned to the United States to play on the Tournament Players' Series, an offshoot tour of the PGA Tour. In August, he played the three-round Provident Classic. In the final round, Hartmann shot a 66 to finish in a tie for sixth place. Later in the month he began play at the Everett Open in Everett, Washington. Hartmann opened with a 65 (−6) to take a one shot lead. However, he failed to break par for the remainder of the tournament and finished outside the top 25. Hartmann played in a few more TPS tournaments for the remainder of the year. He ultimately finished in 31st place on the TPS' money list. According to the Miami Herald, though content with his play Hartmann wanted to improve and, in his words, move on to the "big time." During this era, he began working with David Leadbetter, the famed swing instructor.

In 1985, Hartmann played his first full season in Europe. He made the cut in five of his first seven events but did not record any high finishes, failing to record any top-25s. He was at 92nd place on the Order of Merit at this point. In July, Hartmann played the Lawrence Batley International at The Belfry Golf Club. He had much more success at this event. In the third round he shot a three-under-par 69 to move into solo second place, two back of Graham Marsh. He was the only player in the field without a bogey. It was reported by The Guardian he "played the best golf of his career" during the round. In the final round, Hartmann continued to play well, birdieing three holes in the middle of the front nine to take a three shot lead over Marsh. In the middle of the round, however, he became "anxious around the greens," failing to get up and down several times. He fell into a tie for the lead. Hartmann then bogeyed the par-5 17th hole and par-4 18th hole to lose to Marsh by two. Despite the loss, he earned automatic entry into next week's British Open. In August, Hartmann played the Scandinavian Enterprise Open. He shot under-par every day to finish joint third with, among others, Johnny Miller, three back. In September, shortly after the tour's season ended, Hartmann played the Stiab Grand Prix, a match play tournament on the Swedish Golf Tour. Though a wild-card entry, Hartmann reached the finals of the tournament. In the finals, playing Mats Lanner, he scored six consecutive birdies in the middle of the match for an "easy" 5 & 4 win. Hartmann won $12,000. During this era, he still lived permanently in United States, residing in Venice, Florida.

In the mid-1980s, Hartmann continued to have success in Europe. In June 1986, he played the British Masters at Woburn Golf Club. In the first round he "upstaged his more illustrious rivals," recording seven birdies, on his way to a course record-tying 66 (−6) and a one shot lead over Seve Ballesteros. In the middle of the tournament, he shot rounds of 72 and 70 "to remain in contention," three back of Ballesteros, now the leader, in a tie for third with Bernhard Langer. Hartmann remained near the lead during most of the final round and was still "in contention after he birdied the 14th" hole. However, he shot four-over-par over the course of the next three holes to end his hopes. With a final round 73 (+1), Hartmann finished in a tie for fifth, six back. Two weeks later, Hartmann played the French Open. He closed with rounds of 68 and 67, including birdies on four of his last eight holes, to record a joint fifth place finish. In 1987, he continued to have success. In May, he played the British PGA Championship. Hartmann opened with a 68 to put him two back of Langer, in a tie for second. In the second round, he followed with a 69 to remain in second, still two behind leader Langer, in a tie with José María Cañizares and Ballesteros. Hartmann failed to break 70 in the final two rounds but finished in the top five. Later in the season, he told The Guardian, "I am playing better now than at any time since I first came here in 1984." In both 1986 and 1987, Hartmann finished in the top 50 of the Order of Merit and recorded two top tens each season.

However, Hartmann did not play well for the remainder of the decade. At the end of 1987, like he had in previous years, Hartmann returned to the United States in an attempt to earn his PGA Tour card. However, he was unsuccessful at PGA Tour Qualifying School. He ultimately never made it onto the PGA Tour. In 1988, Hartmann returned to Europe. He played poorly, earning rights to play the weekend in only 5 of 23 tournaments, failing to make the cut in his final 14 events. In 1989, Hartmann continued to struggled; he missed the majority of his cuts again and never threatened to win. Late in the year, Hartmann played the South African Tour where he had a little more success. At the Twee Jonge Gezellen Masters, he finished joint second with Ernie Els and Tertius Claassens, one back of champion Hugh Baiocchi.

In 1990, Hartmann had much more success in Europe, recording a number of top tens throughout the year. In June, he played the Wang Four Stars. Hartmann opened with rounds of 66 (−6) to tie for the lead at the end of each round. He failed to break 70 on the weekend though still finished in the top ten. The following week, Hartmann played the Irish Open at Portmarnock Golf Club. He failed to break par the first two days but closed well, with rounds of 71 and 69, to finish in solo fourth place. At the end of the month, Hartmann began play at the French Open. He fired a second round 65 (−5) to take a two-shot lead. In the final two rounds, however, he shot over-par each day to finish two back, two out of a playoff. Much later in the year, in October, he recorded a couple more top tens. At the Austrian Open, Hartmann fired a third round 66 to put himself in solo third place, only behind leaders Bernhard Langer and Lanny Wadkins. He shot over-par the final day though still tied for 8th place. Two weeks later, at the Portuguese Open, he opened with rounds of 68 (−4) to position himself in fourth place. Hartmann shot over-par in the third round to fall well back but recorded another 68 in the final round to finish in the top ten. Overall, for the year he made the cut in 16 of 25 events with five top tens, his most ever for a single season, and finished 39th on the Order of Merit.

For the remainder of his experience in Europe, however, he did not have much success. In 1991, he made the cut in 12 of 17 events but never threatened to win, finishing 91st on the Order of Merit. The following two years Hartmann played worse, missing the cut in the majority of his events between the two seasons. He failed to finish inside the top 100 of the Order of Merit each year and ceased playing on the European Tour after the 1993 season. In general, the consensus from the media was that Hartmann had "mixed success" in Europe. He later told The Star Tribune, "I had a couple of OK years, a few mediocre years and two really bad years."

=== Club professional ===
Hartmann "finally tired of the lifestyle" as a touring professional and "took the suggestion of an old friend Darrell Kestner to move to Long Island and seek a job as a club pro." He became an assistant club pro at Fresh Meadow Country Club in Great Neck, New York. In June 1994, Hartmann played the Long Island Open. He opened with a three-under-par 67 to tie for the lead. However, "It was the second round that ultimately won the Open for Hartmann," according to Newsday. He shot a 66 (−4) to take a three shot lead over John Gentile and Kestner. In the final round, Kestner briefly got within two but that was it. Hartmann shot a final round 69 to defeat runner-up Kestner by four. It was Hartmann's first win since his victory in Sweden in 1985. He won $6,000. After the tournament, he said it was "his most enjoyable win ever." Later in the summer, Hartmann recorded runner-up finishes at the New York State Open, Metropolitan Open, and Met PGA Assistants Championship. After the Met PGA season ended, Hartmann intended to play tournament golf in South America in the fall. In the winter, he would work as a golf instructor in Florida and play the local minitours.

In 1996, Hartmann started working at Atlantic Golf Club. He continued to play on the Met PGA during this era. In July 1996, Hartmann played the New York State Open at Bethpage Black Course. In the second round, he birdied the first hole on the way to shooting a 66 (−5), one off the course record, to take a three-stroke lead. In the final round, Hartmann shot even-par to win by two strokes. He finished in second place on the Met PGA Player of the Year standing, only behind Bruce Zabriski. In May 1997, he played the Tommy Hilfger Met PGA Head Pro Championship. Hartmann opened with a "near-flawless" round of 67 to take a two-shot lead. In the final round, however, "his lead evaporated" when he made three straight bogeys late on the front nine. Fellow club pro Peter Serafimoff took a two-shot lead. Hartmann, however, "fought back" on the back nine with even-par golf to remain close. On the final hole, meanwhile, Serafimoff hit his drive out of bounds leading to a double bogey. Hartmann defeated him by one. In June, he played the Long Island Open at Bethpage Black Course. Hartmann opened with a 69 (−2) to put him in a tie for second place, four back of leader Jimmy Weiss. In the second round, he shot a one-under-par 70 to get closer. In the final round, Hartmann played "steady, relentless golf" early to overtake Weiss who struggled. Mark Mielke briefly challenged in the middle of the back nine but Hartmann birdied the 16th and "cruised in" from there. He won by three strokes. It was his third win at Bethpage State Park's courses in recent years. "Looks like I kind of like it, doesn't it," he said after the round. He earned $6,000. At the end of the year, he finished in second place in the PaineWebber Metropolitan PGA Section Player of the Year standings, again only behind Zabriski.

Hartmann "dominated area golf in 1998," winning nearly every major tournament on the Met PGA. In May, he played the TaylorMade Long Island PGA Championship. Hartmann reached the quarterfinals where he played Mark Mielke. Hartmann birdied the 18th hole to win 1 up. In the semifinals, he defeated John Gentile 4 & 3. In the finals, Hartmann played Dave Gosiewski. Hartmann took a 3 up lead after five holes and never trailed. He won 2 & 1. After the round, Gosiewski said, "Not only is Rick one of the best players in the Met area, he's one of the best club pros in the country. He's an awful tough guy to beat." Later in the month, he played the two-round Met PGA Head Pro Championship as defending champion. In the final round, Hartmann was three-under-par over the first 16 holes to tie first round leader Mike Caporole. On the 17th hole, both missed the green but Hartmann went up and down while Caporole bogeyed. "Seventeen ended up being the key hole," Hartmann said after the round. "Without it, we would have gone to a playoff." Hartmann won by one and earned $3,600." In June, he played the three-round Long Island Open at Bethpage's Red Course. During the final round, on a "blustery day," Hartmann shot a "brilliant" 66 (−4) to win by three. In August, he played the three-round Metropolitan Open. Hartmann started the final round five strokes back but "got off to a great start" with four birdies on the front nine. He then closed with consecutive birdies on the 17th and 18th holes. He took a two-shot lead over Darrell Kestner. On the final hole, Kestner had an eagle putt to tie. However, he missed; Hartmann defeated him by one. His 63 (−7) was one off the course record. It was also the lowest round of his career. "He is now the premier player in the area,” Kestner stated after the event. He earned $20,000. It was his fourth win of the year. Hartmann ultimately finished in second place at the Met PGA Order of Merit, only narrowly behind Ron McDougal. Newsday considered it his "finest year in the section" so far.

In 2000, Hartmann received media coverage due to qualifying for two major championships. In the spring, he qualified for the 2000 U.S. Open which was held at Pebble Beach Golf Links. Hartmann played well early in the tournament and was well within the cut line near the end of the second round. However, he started "leaking some oil" with bogeys on the 16th and 17th holes during Friday's play. However, he went up and down on the 18th to make the cut by a shot. Hartmann ultimately finished in a tie for 46th place. He said after the tournament, "This was definitely a highlight of my career." A few days later, Hartmann was scheduled to play the PGA of America Club Pro Championship at Oak Tree Golf Club in Edmond, Oklahoma. Hartmann finished in the top 25 and qualified for the 2000 PGA Championship. However, on August 5, shortly before the tournament, his father died. He pulled out of the event.

In 2001, Hartmann had one of his best seasons on the Met PGA. In May, he played the two-round Met PGA Head Pro Championship at Woodmere Golf Club. Hartmann opened with a 62 (−8), breaking the course record by two shots to take the lead. He shot a final round four-over-par 74 but his main competitor, Mark Mielke, also struggled with a 73 (+3). Hartmann's total was enough to defeat him by one. In June, he played the Long Island Open at Bethpage's par-70 Red course. Hartmann opened with rounds of 68 and 66 to tie Mark Mielke, once again his main competitor, for the lead. Mielke, however, struggled once more in the final round allowing Hartmann to pull way. He finished with a 67 to win by five. "That's as good as I can play," Hartmann told Newsday after the round. In July, he played the New York State Open. Hartmann finished in a tie for second place, five back of champion John Nieporte. In August, he played the Metropolitan Open. He was considered one of the favorites. The event was again at Bethpage State Park, this time on the Black course. In the second round, Hartmann fired six birdies on the way to a 65 (−5) and a four-shot lead. He tied the course record, nearly 30 years old. In the final round, however, Hartmann had an "off day," with imprecise iron play and mediocre putting. This allowed amateur Johnson Wagner, who was four-under-par through the first 12 holes, to take control. Hartmann lost to Wagner by three shots. Though he did not win he earned the $23,000 first place cheque because Wagner was an amateur. Due to his good play over the course of the year, Hartmann won Met PGA's Player of the Year Award for the second straight year.

In 2002, Hartmann received some attention for his play in PGA Tour events. In May, he qualified for the tour's Buick Classic which was held at Westchester Country Club. However, Hartmann opened with a 79 (+8) to put him in third to last place. Though he shot a 72 (+1) in the second round, he still missed the cut by a wide margin. In June, he attempted to qualify for the PGA Championship at the PGA Club Professional Championship. Hartmann failed to break par the first three rounds and was outside of the top-25 cut-off. In the final round, however, he shot a 68 (−4), the second best round of the day, to easily make the cut-off and qualify for the tournament. It would be his first appearance at the event. At the 2002 PGA Championship, Hartmann shot rounds of 79 and 73 and missed the cut.

Over the next few years, Hartmann continued to win local events in the northeast. In September 2002, he played the Eastern PGA Club Professional at Shenandoah Golf Club at Turning Stone Resort Casino in upstate New York. Hartmann opened with rounds of 69 and 68 to take the lead. He closed with an even-par 72 to win by one. Hartmann repeated as champion the following year. In 2004, he played the three-round Metropolitan Open at Hudson National Golf Course. In the second round Hartmann shot a 67 (−4), the round of the day at the "confounding" course. He took a "commanding" four-shot lead. In the final round, though, Brian Lamberti shot with a "dramatic" 64 (−7) to take the clubhouse lead. Hartmann recorded sand saves on the final two holes, however, to win by one. At this point in his career he was considered one of the top club pros in the country. Ann Miller of The Honolulu Advertiser referred to him as, "One of the finest club pros in the finest section of club pros in the country."

In the mid-2000s, Hartmann received national media attention. In May 2005, he played the Big Stakes Match Play competition. The tournament was for club pros and mini-tour players. It was a pairs match play event which lasted six rounds. Each player had to put up $50,000 to enter the event which guaranteed $3 million in prize money to the winning team. Members at Hartmann's club, Atlantic Golf Club, put up money for him. Hartmann's partner was Mark Mielke. The event was at Casa Bianca Resort in Mesquite, Nevada. Their team won their first four matches. In the semi-finals, they played the team of Jimmy Blair and Steve Schneiter. Hartmann's team were "slow starters" and were 2 down after 5 holes. However, Mielke made a number of birdies around the turn and the pair took the lead. Hartmann's team eventually won it, 4 & 2. The pair were now guaranteed to win at least several hundred thousands dollars each. "This is life changing," Hartmann said shortly after the win. "This is paying off the car, paying off the mortgage." They were scheduled to play David Ping and Garth Mulroy in the finals. The champions would earn $1.5 million each while the runners-up would split the $675,000 runner-up total. In the finals, Mielke birdied two holes early to give Hartmann's team an early 2 up lead. However, the team of Ping and Mulroy won a number of holes around the turn to take the lead. Two down with two to play, Hartmann birdied the 17th to force an 18th hole. However, Hartmann's team conceded after they failed to birdie the final hole. Despite the loss, Hartmann and Mielke shared the $675,000-second place prize. The event received nation-wide media coverage and was reported by Sports Illustrated. A year later, Hartmann was again in the "national spotlight." He earned the rights to play a sectional qualifier for the 2006 U.S. Open and was paired with David Gossett and Michelle Wie. The two-round event was held at two different courses on Canoe Brook Country Club in Summit, New Jersey. The pairing received much media attention because Wie was trying to become the first female to qualify for the U.S. Open. David Fay, executive director of the USGA, chose Gossett, a former PGA Tour pro, and Hartmann, a former European Tour pro, because of their experiences as touring professionals playing events in front of large galleries. Marty Parkes, spokesman for the organization, stated, "We didn't want someone who would not be able to deal with the situation." According to The Boston Globe, Hartmann was "besieged with attention" due to the pairing. Sports Illustrated commissioned him to write an article about the pairing. Mike Lupica ran a full-length profile of Hartmann before the event in the New York Daily News. At the two-round qualifier, Hartmann opened well, birdieing the first hole and remained near the prospective cut-off for most of the first round. However, he "[blew] up" on the 16th hole, making a double-bogey and ultimately scored a two-over-par 72. Hartmann closed with a 74 (+2) at the North Course to miss the cut-off by six shots.

For the remainder of his career on the Met PGA, Hartmann continued to place high, recording a number of runner-up finishes. In July 2006, Hartmann played the three-round North Fork Bank New York State Open. Hartmann opened with rounds of 69 and 71 to put him two back, in solo third, and earned rights to play in the final group. However, Hartmann opened with a double-bogey on the first hole that, in his words, "kind of put me behind the eight-ball." He was never in contention though still finished in a tie for second, three back. In August, he played the three-round Metropolitan Open at Canoe Brook Golf Club, his first event there since the U.S. Open qualifier with Michelle Wie. Hartmann opened with rounds of 70 and 69 to tie for the lead. He would be in the final round's final group once more. Hartmann came to the par-5 18th hole tied for the lead with a chance to win. However, he was forced "to scramble for par." He entered a three-hole playoff with John Guyton. At the final playoff hole, played at the par-5 12th hole, Hartmann three-putted for par giving Guyton the win. After the round, Hartmann stated, "This one is a little more difficult because I thought I was more in control today." In May 2007, Hartmann played the MasterCard Long Island PGA Championship. Hartmann won all of his early matches to reach the finals. However, in the finals he lost to Ron Faria, his assistant at Atlantic Golf Club, 4 & 3. In August, he played the three-round Metropolitan Open once more. Hartmann finished the tournament birdie-birdie for a 68 (−3) to tie for the clubhouse lead. However, competitor Frank Bensel also closed birdie-birdie to defeat Hartmann by one. In September, Hartmann played the three-round Metropolitan PGA Championship. Hartmann opened with a 79 was ultimately 11 strokes behind entering the final round. However, he had a "torrid" final round, shooting five-under-par through the first 17 holes. Meanwhile, the leader Tony DeMaria struggled and was five-over-par by the middle of the back nine. Hartmann had a 15-foot putt on the final hole to temporarily tie. However, he missed and finished with a 67 (−5). DeMaria closed with four pars to defeat Hartmann by one. In 2008, he recorded another runner-up, this time at the Met PGA Head Pro Championship. In 2009, he won the Long Island PGA Championship, his first win on the Met PGA in several years.

During this era, Hartmann still worked at Atlantic. He was in charge of preparing the club for the 2010 U.S. Mid-Amateur. "The next two years will be a grind but it's good for the game of golf," Hartmann said in early 2009. "It certainly helps amateur golf." Hartmann, did not play much during the year of 2010, according to Newsday, but focused on preparing the club for the event. Shortly thereafter, Hartmann started playing on the senior Met PGA. He had recently turned 50. In 2011, he played the Bacardi Met PGA Senior Championship. The event was held at the par-71 Pine Hollow Club in East Norwich, New York. Hartmann shot rounds of 70 and 69 to win by one. The following year he again had some success, winning the MasterCard Senior Match Play Championship and finishing runner-up at Met PGA Senior Championship. Since 2012, Hartmann has played some Met Senior events but has not had many high results. He continued to work as Atlantic's pro, however.

== Personal life ==
In 1983, while playing in South Africa, he met Claudette. Hartmann and Claudette eventually got married.

Hartmann was friends with the tennis pro Vitas Gerulaitis. They traded golf and tennis lessons with each other. Hartmann served as a pallbearer at Gerulatis' funeral after he died of carbon monoxide poisoning in September 1994.

== Death and legacy ==
In August 2025, at the age of 66, Hartmann died in Sag Harbor, New York. The fashion designer Vera Wang, a member of Atlantic, memorialized him on her Instagram page.

In 2025, the edition of the Berkeley Cup, an event inaugurated by Hartmann, was played in his memory. In addition, it was announced that the low qualifier would earn the Rick Hartmann Medalist Honor. It would be bestowed to the medalist indefinitely.

== Awards and honors ==
In 2000 and 2001, Hartmann earned the Metropolitan's PGA of America section Player of the Year Award.

== Professional wins (26) ==
=== Southern Africa Tour wins (1) ===
No.	Date	Tournament	Winning score	Margin of victory	Runner-up
1	2 Mar 1984	Swazi Sun Pro-Am	−17 (65-68-69-69=271)	1 stroke	(Zimbabwe) Teddy Webber

=== Swedish Golf Tour wins (1) ===
No.	Date	Tournament	Winning score	Margin of victory	Runner-up
1	14 Sep 1985	Stiab Grand Prix	5 and 4		(Sweden) Mats Lanner

=== Met PGA Section wins (16) ===
- 1994 Long Island Open
- 1996 New York State Open
- 1997 Tommy Hilfiger Met PGA Head Pro Championship, Long Island Open
- 1998 TaylorMade Long Island PGA Championship, Met PGA Head Pro Championship, Long Island Open, Metropolitan Open
- 1999 MasterCard Long Island PGA Championship, Hoffhine Memorial Golf Championship
- 2000 MasterCard Long Island PGA Championship, Metropolitan PGA Championship
- 2001 Met PGA Head Pro Championship, Long Island Open
- 2004 Metropolitan Open
- 2009 Long Island PGA Championship

=== Senior Met PGA Sections wins (2) ===
- 2011 Bacardi Met PGA Senior Championship
- 2012 MasterCard Senior Match Play Championship

=== Other wins (6) ===
- 1976 Jimmy Mann County Golf Tournament (as an amateur), Continental Invitational (as an amateur)
- 1999 PGA Tournament Series event
- 2002 Eastern Club Pro Professional Championship
- 2003 Eastern Club Pro Professional Championship
- 2007 TaylorMade Long Island ProAssistants Championship

== Results in major championships ==
Tournament	1984	1985	1986	1987	1988	1989	1990	1991	1992	1993
U.S. Open										
The Open Championship	T62	CUT					CUT			
PGA Championship										

Tournament	1994	1995	1996	1997	1998	1999	2000	2001	2002
U.S. Open							T46		
The Open Championship									
PGA Championship									CUT

Note: Hartmann never played in the Masters Tournament
