= Metropolitan PGA Championship =

Golf tournament

The Metropolitan PGA Championship is a golf tournament that is the section championship of the Metropolitan section of the PGA of America. It has been played annually since 1926 at a variety of courses around the New York City metropolitan area. It was considered a PGA Tour event in the 1920s and 1930s. It is also known as simply the Metropolitan PGA or Met PGA.

== History ==
In 1924, the Metropolitan PGA hosted its first championship. It was a one-round tournament held at Rockaway Hunting Club which was won by Walter Hagen. Though sometimes referred to as the Metropolitan PGA Championship it is different from this event. The "first annual" Metropolitan PGA Championship was held in 1926 at Salisbury Country Club in Salisbury, New York on Long Island. In the finals, playing against "strong winds," Joe Turnesa "played wonderful golf" to defeat Joe Sylvester 6 & 5.

== Winners ==
Year	Winner	Score	To par	Margin of victory	Runner(s)-up	Venue	Ref.
2026	Matt Dobyns	137	−5	1 stroke	Peter Ballo	Winged Foot Golf Club	
2025	Danny Balin	203	−7	6 strokes	Peter Ballo; Andre Chi	Tamarack Country Club	
2024	Dylan Newman	216	E	1 stroke	Frank Bensel	Noyac Golf Club	
2023	Dylan Newman	202	−8	Playoff	Matt Dobyns; Peter Ballo	Nassau Country Club	
2022	Alex Beach						
2021	Peter Ballo						
2020	Jason Caron						
2019	Peter Ballo	205	−5	6 strokes	Matt Dobyns	Sleepy Hollow Country Club	
2018	Jason Caron						
2017	Frank Bensel	210	E	5 strokes	Josh Rackely	Metropolis Country Club	
2016	Matt Dobyns	197	−16	10 strokes	Frank Bensel	Siwanoy Country Club	
2015	Matt Dobyns						
2014	Anthony Casalino	214	−2	2 strokes	Frank Bensel	Glen Oaks Club	
2013	Danny Balin				Frank Bensel		
2012	Danny Balin				Frank Bensel		
2011	Danny Balin	208	−2	2 strokes	Frank Bensel; Nick Bova	Old Oaks	
2010	Mark Brown	207	−6	2 strokes	Danny Balin	Piping Rock Club	
2009	Frank Bensel			1 stroke	Sean Farren	Quaker Ridge Golf Club	
2008	Colin Amaral	209	−7	6 strokes	David Young	Glen Oaks Club	
2007	Tony DeMaria	215	−1	1 stroke	Rick Hartmann	The Stanwich Club	
2006	Ron Philo, Jr.	216	E	1 stroke	Bob Rittberger; Mark Mielke	Wee Burn Country Club	
2005	Mark Brown	207	−6	1 stroke	Darrell Kestner	Metropolis Country Club	
2004	Darrell Kestner	201	−9	8 strokes	Mark Mielke	Inwood Country Club	
2003	Darrell Kestner	215	−1	2 strokes	Rick Hartmann; Mike Gilmore	Atlantic Golf Club	
2002	Charlie Bolling	209	−1	2 strokes	John Reeves	Country Club of Fairfield	
2001	Mark Mielke	204	−9	3 strokes	Carl Alexander	Sunningdale Country Club	
2000	Rick Hartmann	212	+2	Playoff^{1}	Carl Alexander; Heath Wassem	Hudson National Golf Club	
1999	Jay McWilliams	211	−2	2 strokes	Mike Melton	Pine Hollow Country Club	
1998	Carl Alexander	208		Playoff^{2}	Heath Wassem	Century Country Club	
1997	Darrell Kestner	205	−5	4 strokes	Dave Gosiewski	Fresh Meadow Country Club	
1996	Bruce Zabriski	202	−11	1 stroke	Rick Hartmann	Piping Rock Club	
1995	Darrell Kestner	212		Playoff	John DeForest	Quaker Ridge Golf Club	
1994	Darrell Kestner	217	+1	4 strokes	John DeForest	Stanwich Club	
1993	Rick Vershure						
1992	Mark Mielke	216	+3	Playoff	Larry Rentz; Mel Baum	Bethpage Black Course	
1991	Ron McDougal	200	−10	7 strokes	Larry Rentz	Country Club of Fairfield	
1990	Mel Baum						
1989	Mel Baum						
1988	Rick Meskell	214	−2	4 strokes	Jim Albus	Inwood Country Club	
1987	Rick Vershure						
1986	Don Reese						
1985	Don Reese	210	E	1 stroke	Kevin Morris; Roger Ginsberg	Country Club of Fairfield	
1984	Kevin Morris	215	+1	2 strokes	Rick Whitfield		
1983	Ed Sabo	212	+2	6 strokes	John Gentile	Quaker Ridge Golf Club	
1982	Jim Albus	209	−4	4 strokes	Kevin Morris	Century Country Club	
1981	Jim Albus	206	−4	5 strokes	Don Massengale	Fresh Meadow Country Club	
1980	Jimmy Wright			Playoff^{3}	David Glenz	Metropolis Country Club	
1979	Jeff Steinberg	214	+4	1 stroke	Pete Davison	Nassau Country Club	
1978	Austin Straub	215		1 stroke	Marty Bohen		
1977	Gene Borek	144^{4}	+4	2 strokes	Austin Straub	Winged Foot Golf Club	
1976	Jimmy Wright	211	−5	9 strokes	Rex Baxter	Glen Oaks	
1975	Bill Collins	218	+2		Jimmy Wright	Meadow Brook Golf Club	
1974	Jimmy Wright	207	−9	10 strokes	Tom Joyce; Bob Bruno	Meadow Brook Golf Club	
1973	Gene Borek	284	E	3 strokes	Bob Bruno; Roger Ginsburg		
1972	Jimmy Wright	292	+4	1 stroke	Ron Letellier	Inwood	
1971	Tom Nieporte	283	−1	1 stroke	Don Massengale		
1970	Gene Borek	276		5 strokes			
1969	Craig Shankland						
1968	Mike Krak	284	E	4 strokes	Wes Ellis	Pine Hollow Country Club	
1967	Terry Wilcox	277	−3	2 strokes	Doug Ford	Nassau Country Club	
1966	Mike Krak	287		3 strokes	Bill Collins	Century Country Club	
1965	Jerry Pittman	294		4 strokes	Doug Ford; Tom Nieporte	Middle Bay	
1964	Billy Farrell	287	−1	2 strokes	Mickey Homa	Fairview Country Club	
1963	Doug Ford	287	+3	7 strokes	Buck Adams; Steve Doctor; Tom Nieporte	Lido	
1962	Dave Marr	285		Playoff^{5}	Doug Ford	Westchester Country Club	
1961	Ed Merrins	286		Playoff^{6}	Shelley Mayfield	Meadowbrook Golf Club	
1960	Doug Ford				Al Brosch	Winged Foot Golf Club	
1959	Doug Ford	280	E	1 stroke	Al Brosch	Rockaway Hunting Club	
1958	Doug Ford	278		2 strokes	Mickey Homa	Briar Hall Country Club	
1957	Doug Ford	210		1 stroke	Al Feminelli Bill Collins	Concord International Golf Club	
1956	Bill Collins	285	+1	3 strokes	Jim Turnesa	Dellwood Country Club	
1955	Harry Cooper	285	−3	2 strokes	Claude Harmon; Mike Turnesa	Fairview Country Club	
1954	Steve Doctor	289		2 strokes	Claude Harmon	Winged Foot Golf Club	
1953	Clarence Doser	37th hole			Mickey Homa		
1952	Al Brosch	137	−5	2 strokes	Dick DeMane; Claude Harmon	Innis Arden Golf Club	
1951	Claude Harmon	283			Pete Cooper	Cold Spring Country Club	
1950	Al Brosch	136	−4	6 strokes	Willie Goggin	Willows Country Club	
1949	Mike Turnesa	2 up		Playoff^{7}	Al Brosch	Ardsley Country Club	
1948	Clarence Doser						
1947	Al Brosch	279	−9	8 strokes	Pat Cici	Cold Spring Country Club	
1946	Claude Harmon						
1945	Clarence Doser						
1944	Willie Goggin	215		Playoff^{8}	Herman Barron; Frank Strazza		
1943	No tournament due to World War II						
1942	Craig Wood	210		9 strokes	Al Brosch	Fresh Meadow Country Club	
1941	Al Brosch						
1940	Jimmy Hines						
1939	Gene Sarazen	10 & 9			Jimmy Hines		
1938	Al Brosch						
1937	Herman Barron	294		6 strokes	Henry Ciuci; Leo Mallory	Fenway Golf Club	
1936	Paul Runyan						
1935	Paul Runyan						
1934	Leo Mallory						
1933	Walter Scheiber						
1932	Willie Klein						
1931	Paul Runyan				Gene Sarazen		
1930	Joe Turnesa						
1929	Walter Kozak	3 & 1			Jim Turnesa		
1928	Gene Sarazen				Craig Wood		
1927	Gene Sarazen	292		3 strokes	Leo Diegel		
1926	Joe Turnesa	6 & 5			Joe Sylvester	Salisbury Country Club	

== Notes ==
^{1} Hartmann defeated Alexander and Wassem on first sudden-death playoff hole with a bogey.
^{2} Alexander defeated Wassem on the first sudden-death playoff hole with a par.
^{3} Wright defeated Glenz on the first sudden-death playoff hole.
^{4} Rain-shortened event. The second round was cancelled due to rain.
^{5} Marr (72) defeated Ford (75) in an 18-hole playoff.
^{6} Merrins (71) defeated Mayfield (75) in an 18-hole playoff.
^{7}Turnesa tied Brosch after the first 35-hole playoff. Turnesa won the second playoff.
^{8} Goggin (67) defeated Barron (71) and Strazza (73) in an 18-hole playoff.
