= Long Island Open =

Golf tournament

Tournament information
- Location: Long Island, New York
- Established: 1922
- Organized by: Long Island Golf Association
- Format: 54-hole stroke play

Current champion
- Eli Weidmann (a)

The Long Island Open is a professional golf tournament played on Long Island, New York. It is sponsored by the Long Island Golf Association and was first held in 1922 at the Cherry Valley Club in Garden City, New York.

== History ==
The Long Island Open was a PGA Tour-level event in the 1920s and 1930s. Al Brosch won a record ten titles between 1939 and 1959, a record that stands today.

== Winners ==
Year	Champion	Score	To par	Margin of victory	Runner(s)-up	Venue	Ref.
2026	Eli Weidmann (a)	−11	205	1 stroke	Peicheng Chen, Dylan Gallagher (a)	The Seawane Club	
2025	Jay Card	–13	197	Playoff (Note: Three-hole aggregate playoff.)	Dylan Gallagher (a)	Rockaway Hunting Club	
2024	Matt Dobyns	−11	199	1 stroke	Jay Card	Piping Rock Club	
2023	James Nicholas	−11	199	7 strokes	Matt Dobyns	Huntington Crescent Club	
2022	Reid Howey	208	−2	3 strokes	Mark Brown, Connor Costello	Westhampton CC	
2021	Andrew Svoboda	201	−9	Playoff	Darin Goldstein (a)	Fresh Meadow CC	
2020	Jason Caron	205	−5	3 strokes	Danny Balin, Lucas Cromeenes, Matt Dobyns	Sands Point GC	
2019	Andrew Svoboda	206	−7	Playoff	Nick Beddow	Hempstead G&CC	
2018	Andrew Svoboda	199	−6	3 strokes	J. D. Guiney	Nassau CC	
2017	J. D. Guiney	206	−4	2 strokes	Rob Corcoran	Westhampton CC	
2016	Jimmy Hazen	208	−2	5 strokes	Colin Corrigan	Garden City CC	
2015	Jim Farrell	206	−4	Playoff	Matt Dobyns, Mike Furci	The Creek Club	
2014	Jimmy Hazen	213		2 strokes	Abbie Valentine	The Bridge	
2013	Matt Dobyns	211	+1	2 strokes	Dylan Crowley (a)	Fresh Meadow CC	
2012	Mike Meehan	205	−5	Playoff	Matt Dobyns	Bethpage (Red)	
2011	Matt Dobyns	208		3 strokes	Adam Fuchs	Wheatley Hills	
2010	Mark Brown	209		1 stroke	Kirk Oguri	Bethpage (Red)	
2009	Mike Meehan					Atlantic	
2008	Mike Meehan					Bethpage (Red)	
2007	Abbie Valentine					Nassau	
2006	Darrell Kestner					Bethpage (Red)	
2005	Bob Rittberger					Bethpage (Red)	
2004	Keith Blythe					Bethpage (Red)	
2003	Ron Faria					Bethpage (Red)	
2002	Bob Rittberger					Long Island National	
2001	Rick Hartmann	201	−9	5 strokes	P. J. Cowan	Bethpage (Red)	
2000	Mark Mielke					Bethpage (Red)	
1999	Mark Mielke					Bethpage (Red)	
1998	Rick Hartmann	206	−4	3 strokes	Malcolm Smith (a)	Bethpage (Red)	
1997	Rick Hartmann	208	−5	3 strokes	Mark Mielke	Bethpage (Black)	
1996	Tom McGinnis					Bethpage (Red)	
1995	Darrell Kestner					Bethpage (Red)	
1994	Rick Hartmann	202	−8	4 strokes	Darrell Kestner	Bethpage (Red)	
1993	Bruce Zabriski					Bethpage (Red)	
1992	Rick Meskell			Playoff		Bethpage (Red)	
1991	Bruce Zabriski					Bethpage (Red)	
1990	Tom Sutter					Bethpage (Red)	
1989	Bruce Zabriski					Bethpage (Red)	
1988	Jim Albus					Bethpage (Red)	
1987	Jim Albus	212	−4	4 strokes	Jan Kudysch	Hempstead	
1986	Rick Vershure					Cherry Valley	
1985	Bruce Zabriski					Cedarbrook	
1984	Tom Joyce					Cedarbrook	
1983	Don Reese			Playoff		Huntington	
1982	Mike Joyce					Fox Run	
1981	Mal Galletta Jr.	226		Playoff (Note: Galletta defeated Kudysch with a par on the second hole of a sudden-death playoff.)	Jan Kudysch	Noyac	
1980	Don Beatty	143	+1	1 stroke	Mal Galletta Jr.	Fox Run	
1979	Mal Galletta Jr.	213	+3	1 stroke	John Trimboli, Jim Albus	St. George's	
1978	Roger Ginsberg	216	+6	6 strokes	Jay Horton, Lenny Peters Jr.	Huntington Crescent	
1977	Mal Galletta Jr.	213	+3	1 stroke	Jim Albus	St. George's	
1976	Dave Matthews	215		5 strokes	Jim Albus	Westhampton	
1975	Tom Nieporte			Playoff		Nassau	
1974	Jimmy Wright	205	−5	6 strokes	George Burns (a)	Woodmere	
1973	Tom Nieporte					Pine Hollow	
1972	Jimmy Wright	214	−2	3 strokes	Ron Letellier	Harbor Hills	
1971	Gene Borek	218	+2	1 stroke	Ron Letellier	Hempstead	
1970	Jimmy Wright	211				Inwood	
1969	Jimmy Wright					North Hills	
1968	Jerry Pittman	208	−2	3 strokes	Mike Fetchick	Woodmere	
1967	Pete Mazur	216		1 stroke	Jerry Pittman, Arthur Rhodes	Rockville Links	
1966	Gene Borek	220	+10	2 strokes	Tom Nieporte, Pete Mazur, Nunzio Campi	Fresh Meadow CC	
1965	Tom Nieporte	213		4 strokes	Gene Borek, Pete Mazur	Piping Rock Club	
1964	Tom Nieporte	213		3 strokes	Mike Fetchik	Rockaway Hunting Club	
1963	Art Silverstone	220		2 strokes	Ernie Boros	Muttontown	
1962	Tom Nieporte	214	+4	Playoff (Note: Nieporte (71) defeated LaClair (72) and DeMane (77) in an 18-hole playoff.)	Houston LaClair, Dick DeMane	Garden City CC	
1961	Ed Merrins	211	+1	4 strokes	Joe Moresco	Westhampton	
1960	Bob Stuhler	216	E	1 stroke	Shelley Mayfield	North Hempstead	
1959	Al Brosch					Rockville	
1958	John Cleary					Meadow Brook	
1957	Shelley Mayfield	214	+1	7 strokes	Al Brosch	Woodmere	
1956	Al Brosch	221		2 strokes	W. G. Holloway	St. George's	
1955	Art Doering	213	+3	1 stroke	Jay Hebert	Great River	
1954	Jay Hebert	213	E	1 stroke	Al Brosch	Southward Ho	
1953	Al Brosch					Meadow Brook	
1952	Fred Wampler					North Hempstead	
1951	Al Brosch					Plandome	
1950	Al Brosch	211		1 stroke	George Stuhler	Meadow Brook	
1949	Al Brosch					Willow Brook	
1948	Al Brosch					Garden City CC	
1947	Al Brosch	287	−1	7 strokes	George Stuhler	Brookville	
1946	Al Brosch					Hempstead	
1945	Henry Ransom					Wheatley Hills	
1942–1944: No tournament due to World War II
1941	Pat Cici	287	−1	Playoff (Note: Cici (73) defeated Klein (74) in 18-hole playoff.)	Willie Klein	Lido	
1940	Joe Turnesa	288		8 strokes	Al Brosch	Inwood	
1939	Al Brosch	276		12 strokes	Tony Longo	Wheatley Hills	
1938	Joe Turnesa	291	+3	2 strokes	Jimmy Hines	Rockville	
1937	Jim Barnes	295	+3	7 strokes	Jimmy Hines	Huntington Crescent Club	
1936	Charles Lacey	289		5 strokes		Rockville	
1935	Jimmy Hines	297		3 strokes		Fresh Meadow CC	
1934	Joe Turnesa					Lakeville	
1933	Willie Klein	296		1 stroke	Walter Kozak	Lido	
1932	Walter Kozak					Garden City CC	
1931	Macdonald Smith					Southward Ho	
1930	Macdonald Smith	278		8 strokes	Willie Klein	Engineers	
1929	Macdonald Smith	286		2 strokes	Gene Sarazen	Salisbury	
1928	George Voigt	293		3 strokes	Willie Klein	Salisbury	
1927	Gene Sarazen	290		11 strokes	Cox	Salisbury	
1926	Jimmy Law	294				Salisbury	
1925	Macdonald Smith	281		10 strokes	Gene Sarazen	Salisbury	
1924	James Maiden	290				St. Albans	
1923	Willie Klein					Garden City CC	
1922	Willie Klein	306		2 strokes	George Heron, Jack Pirie	Cherry Valley	
