= Al Brosch =

American golfer (1911–1975)

- Brosch hitting a shot (c. 1965)

Personal information
- Full name: Albert Wenzel Brosch
- Nickname: Red
- Nationality: United States
- Born: November 8, 1911 Farmingdale, New York, U.S.
- Died: December 10, 1975 (aged 64) Mineola, New York, U.S.
- Height: 6 ft 3 in (1.91 m)
- Spouse: Ellen Fredericka Blixt

Career
- Sport: Golf
- Status: Professional
- Former tour: PGA Tour
- Professional wins: 25

Best results in major championships
- Masters Tournament: T35: 1950
- PGA Championship: T5: 1951
- U.S. Open: 6th: 1937
- The Open Championship: DNP

Albert Wenzel "Red" Brosch (November 8, 1911 – December 10, 1975) was an American professional golfer.

== Early life ==
Brosch was born in Farmingdale, New York, on November 8, 1911, to Henry J. Brosch and his wife Catherine.

== Professional career ==
Brosch turned pro in the 1930s. He primarily worked primarily as a club pro. However, Brosch also played some as a touring professional on what is now known as the PGA Tour. He made 125 cuts between 1933 and 1962. Broach's career was interrupted by his service in World War II. He was drafted in 1943 and reached the rank of corporal.

Brosch was the first player to shoot a round of 60 on the Tour, in the third round of the 1951 Texas Open. He went on to finish fourth, shooting a final-round 70 (268), three strokes out of the Dutch Harrison-Doug Ford playoff. Three weeks later, Brosch turned in his top PGA Tour performance, a runner-up finish at the St. Petersburg Open. He fell by six strokes to winner Jim Ferrier.

As a club pro, he worked primarily in the New York City area, including Bethpage, Cherry Valley Club, and Sands Point Golf Club. Brosch won the Long Island Open ten times, the Long Island PGA Championship nine times, and the Metropolitan PGA six times. He success was so great at the Long Island PGA that the tournament was jocularly referred to as a "benefit" for Brosch because he reliably picked up the first place cheque.

== Personal life ==
In June 1936, he married Ellen Fredericka Blixt.

Brosch died on December 10, 1975, and was interred in Long Island National Cemetery.

== Awards and honors ==
In 1975, Brosch was honored as the PGA Metropolitan Section’s second Sam Snead Award recipient for his contributions to golf, the PGA and the Metropolitan Section.

== Professional wins (25) ==
this list mat be incomplete

- 1938 Metropolitan PGA
- 1939 Long Island PGA Championship, Long Island Open
- 1940 Long Island PGA Championship
- 1941 Metropolitan PGA
- 1942 Long Island PGA Championship
- 1946 Long Island Open
- 1947 Metropolitan PGA, Long Island PGA Championship, Long Island Open
- 1948 Long Island Open
- 1949 Long Island PGA Championship, Long Island Open
- 1950 Metropolitan PGA, Long Island PGA Championship, Long Island Open
- 1951 Long Island PGA Championship, Long Island Open
- 1952 Metropolitan PGA
- 1953 Long Island Open
- 1956 Long Island Open
- 1959 Metropolitan PGA, Long Island PGA Championship, Long Island Open
- 1960 Long Island PGA Championship

== Results in major championships ==
| Tournament | 1934 | 1935 | 1936 | 1937 | 1938 | 1939 |
|---|---|---|---|---|---|---|
| Masters Tournament | | | | T36 | | |
| U.S. Open | CUT | | T28 | 6 | T41 | CUT |
| PGA Championship | | | | | | R32 |

| Tournament | 1940 | 1941 | 1942 | 1943 | 1944 | 1945 | 1946 | 1947 | 1948 | 1949 |
|---|---|---|---|---|---|---|---|---|---|---|
| Masters Tournament | | | | NT | NT | NT | | | | |
| U.S. Open | T47 | | NT | NT | NT | NT | T53 | T39 | | 13 |
| PGA Championship | R16 | | | NT | | | | R64 | R32 | R16 |

| Tournament | 1950 | 1951 | 1952 | 1953 | 1954 | 1955 | 1956 | 1957 | 1958 | 1959 |
|---|---|---|---|---|---|---|---|---|---|---|
| Masters Tournament | T35 | | T55 | T38 | | | | | | |
| U.S. Open | CUT | T10 | T15 | CUT | | | T37 | T43 | | |
| PGA Championship | R32 | QF | | | | | | | T59 | |

| Tournament | 1960 | 1961 | 1962 |
|---|---|---|---|
| Masters Tournament | | | |
| U.S. Open | | | |
| PGA Championship | CUT | | CUT |

Note: Brosch never played in The Open Championship.

Top 10
Did not play

NT = no tournament
CUT = missed the half-way cut
R64, R32, R16, QF, SF = round in which player lost in PGA Championship match play
"T" indicates a tie for a place
