= La Tourette Golf Course =

Golf course in Staten Island, New York

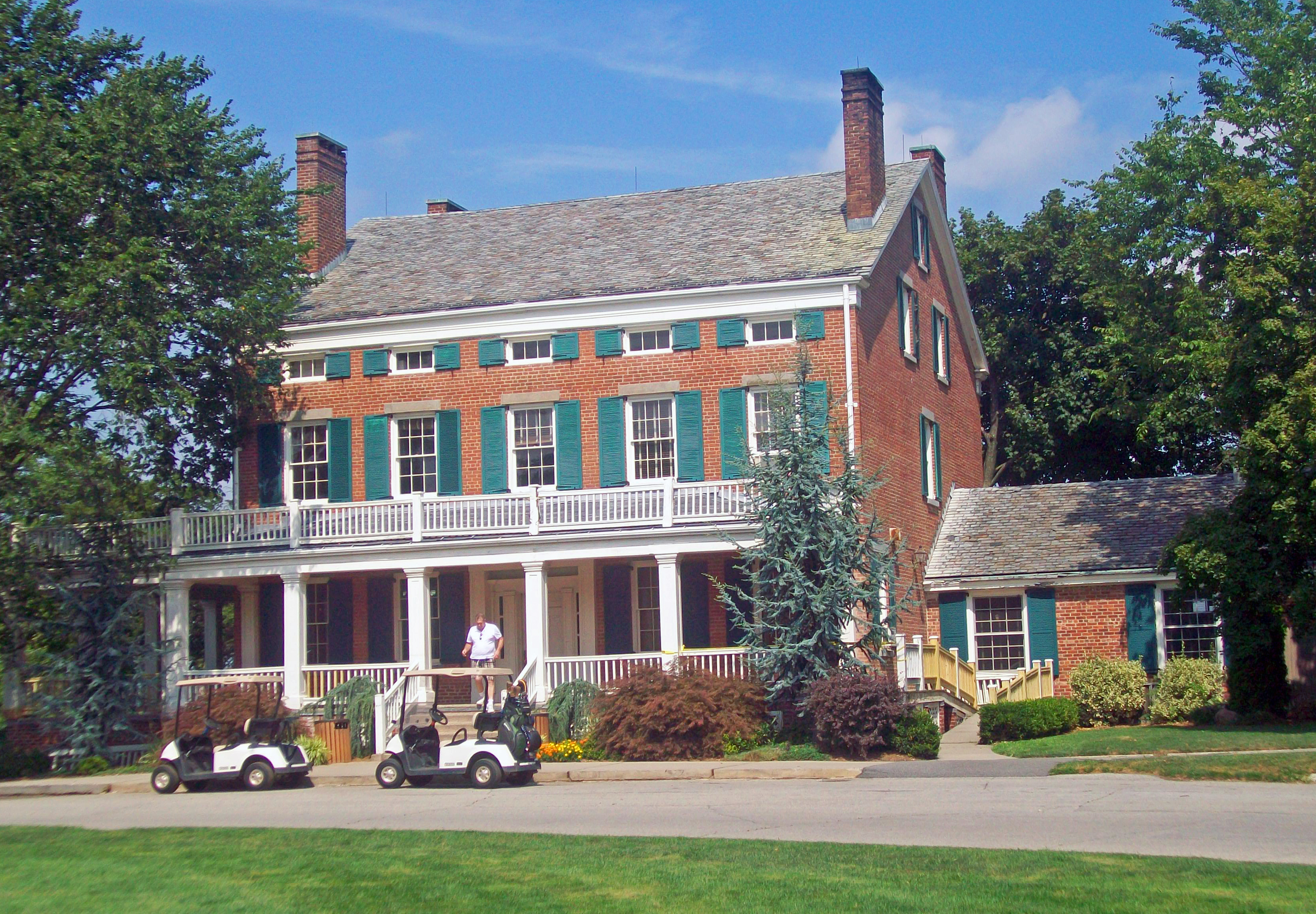

- Location within New York City
- 40°34′34.00″N 74°8′50.00″W

Club information
- Location: Staten Island, New York, U.S.
- Established: 1928
- Type: public
- Tota holes: 18
- Tournaments: New York City Amateur
- Website: https://www.latourettegc.com/
- Designed by: John R. Van Kleek
- Par: 72
- Length: 6,708 yards
- Course rating: 71.7
- Slope rating: 121

La Tourette Golf Course is a public course on Staten Island in New York City. The land is part of Staten Island's Greenbelt and has views of historic Richmond Town. The La Tourette House, which dates to 1836 and is on the National Register of Historic Places, serves as the clubhouse. Considered by some to be the crown jewel of New York City's public golf course network, it is home to the annual New York City Amateur Championship.

== History ==
La Tourette Park, like much of the surrounding area, was once the farm property of David (1786–1864) and Ann (1794–1862) La Tourette. The La Tourette's established their farm in 1830. Soon their 500-acre holding was the largest privately owned property on Staten Island. Over time the farm became one of the top producing family–run farms in the area and was renowned for its superb produce. The La Tourette family operated the farm until 1910. In 1928, New York City purchased 120 acres of the property for $3,500 per acre with plans to build a public golf course. The site was transferred to the parks department in 1955 and was designated a New York City Landmark in 1973.

The first nine holes, designed by David L. Rees, opened in 1929. The original course included the current versions of the 15th through 18th holes and finished with three par 3s, the last of which played away from the clubhouse. In 1935, John Van Kleek designed nine new holes and redesigned the original nine. A major addition, the restaurant area, was added to the clubhouse as well. In 1964 Frank Duane remodeled four holes.

In the 1960s work began on the Richmond Parkway, now known as Korean War Veterans Parkway, which was planned by Robert Moses (1888-1981) based on proposals drawn up in the 1930s. Moses, who was New York City's Parks Commissioner from 1934 till 1960, had a master plan for a network of parkways throughout New York City. His plan for Staten Island was to ring the island with roadways and to crisscross the borough with Richmond Parkway and the Willowbrook Expressway, now named in honor of the Rev. Dr. Martin Luther King Jr. In 1970, New York State approved routing of the roadways through Staten Island's green space. The State rejected alternatives proposed by the City because they would require the taking of more than 200 homes. Maps of the proposed roadways show a break-up of La Tourette Golf Course. Richmond Parkway would have run up the 4th fairway with an interchange at Richmond Hill Road near the 5th and 11th tees. The road would have continued across the 13th and 14th holes and a large interchange with the Willowbrook Expressway was to be built beyond the 16th green and 17th tee. In the 1800s, Staten Islander and great landscape architect Frederick Law Olmsted envisioned miles of parkland covering the central rugged portions of the island. In the 1970s islanders agreed with Olmsted and the building of the roadways through the middle of the island were canceled after community opposition; the Parkway and the Expressway were completed to their current configuration.

Jim Albus, a multiple winner on the PGA Tour Champions, was La Tourette's head professional from 1969 till 1980. Albus is a winner of the prestigious Metropolitan Open and the Senior Players Championship. He is a member of the PGA Metropolitan Section Hall of Fame.

== Course description ==
La Tourette has medium size greens, some of which have multiple plateaus (1, 3, 6, 16, 17) and others with unique mounding (4-original, 5, 7, 8, 12, 13, 15). One of the more difficult par 4s is the 5th hole with trees hanging over the right side of the green and a large mound separating the green in two. Holes 4, 6, 10, 12, 13, 15 and 18 play uphill to the green. For the most part, the golf course is right in front of you with few if any blind shots. For years La Tourette had the unique feature of two practice putting greens, one for flat putts and one for breaking putts. Today the two greens are mowed as one big practice green.

Since its last major update in 1964, the golf course has seen some minor changes to improve course maintenance and increase speed of play. A fairway bunker short and right of the 1st green was removed. In the 1970s the 3rd green was extended in the back right and the progression of lengthening the hole some 35 yards began. On the 4th hole a large bunker in the middle of the fairway was removed and a second green was built to the right of the original green when a bike path was built along Forest Hill Road. The size of the putting surfaces of the 7th and 12th greens were reduced which eliminated some of the unique putting contours of the original design. In the 1970s the back tee was cleared so the 8th hole could play over the lake and the left fairway bunkers, that were out of play near the 9th hole, were removed. Out of play bunkers to the left of the 11th fairway, protecting Forest Hill Road, had been abandoned and neglected for years but were restored to protect the new bike path.

== Course scorecard ==
La Tourette Golf Course
Tee	Rating/Slope	1	2	3	4	5	6	7	8	9	Out	10	11	12	13	14	15	16	17	18	In	Total
Par	Men/Women	5	4	3	4	4	4	3	4	4	35	5	4	3	4	4	4	4	5	4	37	72
Back	M:71.7/121	519	325	151	380	438	408	166	370	401	3158	511	382	200	417	354	394	397	497	414	3550	6708
Middle	M:70.9/134	509	315	123	370	428	398	152	296	391	3046	481	372	137	392	344	384	387	431	398	3292	6338
Forward	W:71.9/123	434	265	101	334	391	347	141	312	322	2647	467	284	131	377	306	282	285	402	296	2830	5477
SI	Men	13	15	17	7	1	3	11	9	5		16	14	10	2	18	4	8	12	6
SI	Women	5	13	15	7	1	3	17	11	9		4	14	16	2	18	6	12	8	10
