= Long Island Golf Association =

- Abbreviation: LIGA

The Long Island Golf Association (LIGA) is a local golf association of 81 public and private clubs and courses that conducts competitive golf tournaments for Long Island, Staten Island and Manhattan residents and clubs. The LIGA annually conducts 16 championships for its members and fields a team of the Islands' best amateurs to compete annually in the Stoddard Trophy triad matches against teams from New Jersey and Westchester.

== History ==
The LIGA was organized in 1922 by some of the area's leading amateur golfers and industrialists. Founders including John Montgomery Ward, from Garden City Golf Club, the association's first President and a member of baseball's Hall of Fame, John N. Stearns Jr., of National Golf Links of America and Piping Rock, and Gardiner White of Nassau Country Club gave their active support for the fledgling organization. The LIGA has 37 founding member clubs in 1922, 11 of which are no longer in existence and 3 of which have changed locations. In its inaugural year, three championships were conducted: the Open at Cherry Valley Club (won by Willie Klein), the Amateur at the original Lido Club (won by H. W. Maxwell, Jr.), and the Junior at Oakland.
