= Jimmy Hines =

American golfer (1903–1986)

Personal information
- Full name: James J. Hines
- Nationality: United States
- Born: December 29, 1903 Mineola, New York, U.S.
- Died: May 11, 1986 (aged 82) Monterey, California, U.S.

Career
- Sport: Golf
- Turned professional: 1933
- Former tour: PGA Tour
- Professional wins: 14

Number of wins by tour
- PGA Tour: 9
- Other: 5

Best results in major championships
- Masters Tournament: T7: 1934
- PGA Championship: T3: 1933, 1938
- U.S. Open: T8: 1934
- The Open Championship: T21: 1952

James J. Hines (December 29, 1903 – May 11, 1986) was an American professional golfer.

== Career ==
In 1903, Hines was born in Mineola, New York.

In 1920, Hines "got his start" at Wheatley Hills Golf Club. Four years later, he got a job as assistant professional at Hempstead Golf Club. He worked there for eight years. Later, he worked as professional at Timber Point and Garden City. On October 26, 1937, Hines became the new professional at Lakeville Golf Club.

Hines won nine times on the PGA Tour and was selected to the 1939 Ryder Cup team but the event was cancelled due to World War II.

On the 13th hole at the 1938 PGA tournament, his chip shot hit opponent Sam Snead's ball, sending both into the cup. A birdie two was awarded to both players, who were tied at that point. Snead wound up beating Hines by one stroke.

In 1986, Hines died in Monterey, California.

== Professional wins (14) ==
=== PGA Tour wins (9) ===
- 1933 (1) Glens Falls Open
- 1935 (1) St. Augustine Pro-Amateur
- 1936 (3) Riverside Open, Los Angeles Open, Glens Falls Open
- 1937 (2) Metropolitan Open, Glens Falls Open
- 1938 (1) Metropolitan Open
- 1945 (1) Tacoma Open

=== Other wins (5) ===
- 1935 Long Island Open
- 1937 Long Island PGA Championship
- 1940 Metropolitan PGA Championship
- 1941 Long Island PGA Championship
- 1949 Arizona Open

== Results in major championships ==
Tournament	1932	1933	1934	1935	1936	1937	1938	1939
Masters Tournament	NYF	NYF	T7	T9	T39	T10	T10	T22
U.S. Open			T8	CUT		T20	T11	T20
The Open Championship								
PGA Championship	R32	SF		R32	QF	QF	SF	

Tournament	1940	1941	1942	1943	1944	1945	1946	1947	1948	1949
Masters Tournament	T27	T19	T33	NT	NT	NT	49			
U.S. Open	T20	24	NT	NT	NT	NT	37		T35	
The Open Championship	NT	NT	NT	NT	NT	NT				
PGA Championship	R16	QF	R64	NT	R16		R64		R32	

Tournament	1950	1951	1952	1953	1954	1955	1956	1957	1958	1959	1960
Masters Tournament											
U.S. Open	CUT			CUT							
The Open Championship			T21								
PGA Championship	R32			R64	R64						CUT

Top 10
Did not play

NYF = tournament not yet founded
NT = no tournament
CUT = missed the half-way cut
R64, R32, R16, QF, SF = round in which player lost in PGA Championship match play
"T" = tied

=== Summary ===
Tournament	Wins	2nd	3rd	Top-5	Top-10	Top-25	Events	Cuts made
Masters Tournament	0	0	0	0	4	6	10	10
U.S. Open	0	0	0	0	1	6	11	8
The Open Championship	0	0	0	0	0	1	1	1
PGA Championship	0	0	2	5	7	11	16	15
Totals	0	0	2	5	12	24	38	34

- Most consecutive cuts made – 25 (1935 PGA – 1948 PGA)
- Longest streak of top-10s – 4 (1933 PGA – 1935 Masters)

== See also ==
- List of golfers with most PGA Tour wins
