= Tacoma Open Invitational =

Golf tournament formerly on the PGA Tour

The Tacoma Open Invitational was a golf tournament on the PGA Tour that was played in 1948 and won by Ed Oliver in a one-hole playoff with Cary Middlecoff after the two had survived a five-man, 18-hole playoff — the first in tour history. Oliver eagled the final playoff hole; Middlecoff birdied it. Byron Nelson, who in 1945 won a record-setting 18 tournaments including 11 consecutively, ended up tied for ninth in the tournament — his worst finish of the year. In 1945, the event played as the Tacoma Open and was won by Jimmy Hines by one stroke over Harold "Jug" McSpaden.

Both events were held at Fircrest Golf Club, an 18-hole, par-71 private club located just west of Tacoma. Construction on the course began in 1923 under the direction of Arthur Vernon Macan. It opened in 1924. Fircrest hosted the Carling Open Invitational in 1960.

== Winners ==
Year	Player	Country	Score	To par	Margin of victory	Runner(s)-up	Winner's share ($)	Ref
Tacoma Open Invitational
1948	Ed Oliver	United States	274	−10	Playoff	(United States) Chuck Congdon (United States) Vic Ghezzi (United States) Fred Haas (United States) Cary Middlecoff	2,150	
1946–1947: No tournament
Tacoma Open
1945	Jimmy Hines	United States	275	−5	1 stroke	(United States) Jug McSpaden	2,000	
