= 1982–83 Southern Africa Tour =

Golf tour season

1982–83 Southern Africa Tour season
- Duration: 12 January 1983 – 5 March 1983
- Number of official events: 8
- Most wins: (South Africa) John Bland (2)
- Order of Merit: (Zimbabwe) Nick Price

The 1982–83 Southern Africa Tour was the 12th season of the Southern Africa Tour, the main professional golf tour in South Africa since it was formed in 1971.

== Season outline ==
The early part of the season was dominated by two unheralded Americans Corey Pavin and Charlie Bolling. They respectively won the top two events, the Lexington PGA and Datsun South African Open. In the middle of the season a number of local golfers won their first events on tour, including Wayne Westner, Gavan Levenson, and Teddy Webber. It was winless Nick Price, however, who won the Order of Merit by virtue of a number of runner-up finishes.

At the first event, the Gordon's Gin Classic, South Africa's David Frost won over Nick Price while American rookie Corey Pavin finished joint third. The following week, at the Lexington PGA, American Charlie Bolling had the 54-hole lead but "faded" with a final round 72 to finish third. Pavin, meanwhile, recorded a 66 in the final round to defeat Price by a shot. Bolling, however, came back and won the following week at the Datsun South African Open. The Daily Telegraph noted, "both major Sunshine Circuit titles have gone to young Americans not good enough to win their players card on the United States tour."

A number of South Africans won their first significant tournaments late in the year. Wayne Westner won the fourth event of the year, the ICL Tournament Players Classic. It was his first win on tour. The following week, Gavan Levenson shot a course record 62 to win the Sigma Vaals Reef Open by two shots over Nick Price. He won $5,700. It was also his first win on tour. In mid-February, at the Quindrink Golf Classic, Zimbabwean Teddy Webber shot a final round 68 to overcome a four stroke deficit and defeat third round leader Fulton Allem by one shot. It was also his first win on tour. Though he did not win a tournament, Price won the Order of Merit.

== Schedule ==
The following table lists official events during the 1982–83 season.

Date	Tournament	Location	Purse (R)	Winner (Note: The number in brackets after each winner's name is the number of Southern Africa Tour events they had won up to and including that tournament. This information is only shown for Southern Africa Tour members.)	Notes
15 Jan	Gordon's Gin Classic	Transvaal	100,000	(South Africa) David Frost (1)	
22 Jan	Lexington PGA Championship	Transvaal	100,000	(United States) Corey Pavin (1)	
29 Jan	Datsun South African Open	Cape	90,000	(United States) Charlie Bolling (1)	
5 Feb	ICL Tournament Players Classic	Transvaal	40,000	(South Africa) Wayne Westner (1)	
12 Feb	Sigma Vaal Reefs Open	Transvaal	40,000	(South Africa) Gavan Levenson (1)	
19 Feb	Quindrink Golf Classic	Natal	40,000	(Zimbabwe) Teddy Webber (1)	
26 Feb	Holiday Inns Pro-Am	Swaziland	40,000	(South Africa) John Bland (7)	Pro-Am
5 Mar	Kodak Golf Classic	Transvaal	40,000	(South Africa) John Bland (8)	New tournament

=== Unofficial events ===
The following events were sanctioned by the Southern Africa Tour, but did not carry official money, nor were wins official.

Date	Tournament	Location	Purse (R)	Winner	Notes
5 Dec	Nedbank Million Dollar Challenge	Transvaal	US$1,000,000	(United States) Raymond Floyd	Limited-field event

== Order of Merit ==
The Order of Merit was based on prize money won during the season, calculated in South African rand.

Position	Player	Prize money (R)
1	(Zimbabwe) Nick Price	31,969
2	(South Africa) David Frost	29,820
3	Charlie Bolling	23,669
4	(United States) Corey Pavin	23,659
5	(South Africa) John Bland	22,187
