= Tom Nieporte =

American professional golfer (1928–2014)

Personal information
- Full name: Thomas Nieporte
- Nationality: United States
- Born: October 21, 1928 Cincinnati, Ohio, U.S.
- Died: December 21, 2014 (aged 86) Boca Raton, Florida, U.S.
- Height: 6 ft 1 in (1.85 m)
- Weight: 185 lb (84 kg; 13.2 st)

Career
- Sport: Golf
- College: Ohio State University
- Turned professional: 1953
- Former tours: PGA Tour; Champions Tour
- Professional wins: 11

Number of wins by tour
- PGA Tour: 3
- Other: 8

Best results in major championships
- Masters Tournament: T26: 1965
- PGA Championship: T5: 1964
- U.S. Open: T17: 1958
- The Open Championship: DNP

Thomas Nieporte (October 21, 1928 – December 21, 2014) was an American professional golfer who played on the PGA Tour in the 1950s and 1960s.

== Early life and amateur career ==
Nieporte grew up in the Cincinnati suburb of North College Hill, Ohio. He attended the Ohio State University and was a distinguished member of the golf team, winning the NCAA Championship in 1951.

== Professional career ==
In 1953, Nieporte turned professional. He played full-time on the PGA Tour for five years, but like most professional golfers of his generation, he spent most of his career earning his living as a club pro. He won three PGA Tour events. The biggest win of his career came in 1967 at the Bob Hope Desert Classic; the Champions Trophy was presented to Nieporte by former President Dwight D. Eisenhower and Bob Hope. His best finish in a major was T5 at the 1964 PGA Championship.

Nieporte co-authored the book "Mind over Golf" with Donald Sauers.

Nieporte was the head pro at Piping Rock Club on Long Island from 1963 to 1978. From 1978 until his retirement in 2006, he was the head pro at Winged Foot Golf Club in Mamaroneck, New York, the site of five U.S. Opens and one PGA Championship.

== Personal life ==
On December 21, 2014, Nieporte died at the age of 86 in Boca Raton, Florida. He was survived by his wife Joan and their nine children.

== Awards and honors ==
In 1983, Nieporte was inducted into the Ohio State Varsity O Hall of Fame.

== Amateur wins ==
- 1951 NCAA Championship

== Professional wins (11) ==
=== PGA Tour wins (3) ===
No.	Date	Tournament	Winning score	Margin of victory	Runner-up
1	Aug 23, 1959	Rubber City Open Invitational	−13 (67-69-65-66=267)	3 strokes	(United States) Bob Goalby
2	Apr 3, 1960	Azalea Open	−11 (64-68-72-73=277)	2 strokes	(United States) Gay Brewer
3	Feb 5, 1967	Bob Hope Desert Classic	−11 (76-68-68-68-69=349)	1 stroke	(United States) Doug Sanders

=== Other wins (8) ===
- 1962 Long Island Open, Long Island PGA Championship
- 1964 Long Island Open
- 1965 Long Island Open
- 1966 Metropolitan Open
- 1971 Metropolitan PGA Championship
- 1973 Long Island Open
- 1975 Long Island Open
