= Jim Albus =

American professional golfer (born 1940)

Personal information
- Full name: James Christian Albus
- Nationality: United States
- Born: June 18, 1940 (age 86) Staten Island, New York, U.S.
- Height: 6 ft 1 in (1.85 m)
- Weight: 215 lb (98 kg; 15.4 st)

Career
- Sport: Golf
- College: Bucknell University; University of California, Los Angeles
- Turned professional: 1968
- Former tours: PGA Tour; Champions Tour
- Professional wins: 19

Number of wins by tour
- PGA Tour Champions: 6
- Other: 13

Best results in major championships
- Masters Tournament: DNP
- PGA Championship: T65: 1984
- U.S. Open: T30: 1984
- The Open Championship: DNP

James Christian Albus (born June 18, 1940) is an American professional golfer.

== Early life and amateur career ==
Albus was born in Staten Island, New York. He attended New Dorp High School, and went on to Bucknell University, where he was a successful baseball player. It was while he was at college that he took up golf, which was unusually late for a future pro. He transferred to UCLA and graduated in 1965.

== Professional career ==
In 1968, he became a golf professional and worked as a club professional at courses that included La Tourette Golf Course and Piping Rock Club. He won a number of local and regional tournaments while he was a club professional and played in five U.S. Opens and seven PGA Championships. He was Met PGA Player of the Year in 1981, 1982, 1986 and 1988. Albus' greatest success came after he turned 50 and began playing on the Senior PGA Tour, now known as the PGA Tour Champions, where he has won six tournaments, including a senior major, the 1991 Senior Players Championship.

Albus has been inducted into the Staten Island Sports Hall of Fame as well as the PGA Metropolitan Section Hall of Fame. He played his last event associated with the PGA Tour organization in 2009.

== Professional wins (19) ==
=== Regular career wins (11) ===
- 1970 Metropolitan Open
- 1975 Long Island PGA Championship
- 1976 Long Island PGA Championship
- 1978 New York State Open
- 1981 Metropolitan PGA Championship, Long Island PGA Championship
- 1982 Metropolitan PGA Championship
- 1984 Metropolitan Open
- 1986 Long Island PGA Championship
- 1987 Long Island Open
- 1988 Long Island Open

=== Senior PGA Tour wins (6) ===
Legend
Senior PGA Tour major championships (1)
Senior PGA Tour regular events (5)

| No. | Date | Tournament | Winning score | Margin of victory | Runners-up |
|---|---|---|---|---|---|
| 1 | Jun 9, 1991 | Mazda Presents The Senior Players Championship | −9 (66-74-69-70=279) | 3 strokes | (New Zealand) Bob Charles, (United States) Charles Coody, (United States) Dave Hill |
| 2 | Feb 21, 1993 | GTE Suncoast Classic | −7 (68-68-70=206) | 2 strokes | (United States) Don Bies, (United States) Gibby Gilbert |
| 3 | Mar 13, 1994 | Vantage at The Dominion | −8 (68-67-73=208) | 1 stroke | (United States) George Archer, (Australia) Graham Marsh, (United States) Lee Trevino |
| 4 | Aug 7, 1994 | Bank of Boston Senior Golf Classic | −13 (67-66-70=203) | 2 strokes | (United States) Bob Brue, (United States) Raymond Floyd |
| 5 | Mar 12, 1995 | The Dominion Seniors (2) | −11 (71-65-69=205) | 3 strokes | (United States) Raymond Floyd, (United States) Jay Sigel |
| 6 | Feb 15, 1998 | GTE Classic (2) | −6 (68-69-70=207) | 1 stroke | (Spain) José María Cañizares, (South Africa) Simon Hobday, (United States) Kermit Zarley |

Senior PGA Tour playoff record (0–3)

| No. | Year | Tournament | Opponent | Result |
|---|---|---|---|---|
| 1 | 1994 | GTE Northwest Classic | (South Africa) Simon Hobday | Lost to birdie on third extra hole |
| 2 | 1994 | Golf Magazine Senior Tour Championship | (United States) Raymond Floyd | Lost to birdie on fifth extra hole |
| 3 | 1995 | Senior Tournament of Champions | (United States) Jim Colbert | Lost to birdie on third extra hole |

=== Other senior wins (2) ===
- 2001 Georgia-Pacific Super Seniors Match-Play Championship, Liberty Mutual Legends of Golf - Legendary Division (with Simon Hobday)

== Results in major championships ==
=== Timeline ===
| Tournament | 1977 | 1978 | 1979 | 1980 | 1981 | 1982 | 1983 | 1984 | 1985 | 1986 | 1987 | 1988 |
|---|---|---|---|---|---|---|---|---|---|---|---|---|
| U.S. Open | | | | CUT | | CUT | CUT | T30 | | CUT | | |
| PGA Championship | CUT | | | | CUT | CUT | CUT | T65 | CUT | | | CUT |

Note: Albus never played in the Masters Tournament nor The Open Championship.

Did not play

CUT = missed 36 hole cut
"T" = tied

== Results in senior major championships ==
=== Wins (1) ===
| Year | Championship | Winning score | Margin | Runners-up |
|---|---|---|---|---|
| 1991 | Mazda Presents The Senior Players Championship | −9 (66-74-69-70=279) | 3 strokes | (New Zealand) Bob Charles, (United States) Charles Coody, (United States) Dave Hill |

=== Timeline ===
Results may not be in chronological order.

| Tournament | 1990 | 1991 | 1992 | 1993 | 1994 | 1995 | 1996 | 1997 | 1998 | 1999 |
|---|---|---|---|---|---|---|---|---|---|---|
| Senior PGA Championship | – | | T22 | T7 | T38 | T10 | | T27 | T39 | T39 |
| U.S. Senior Open | T27 | T29 | T26 | T35 | T2 | T29 | T27 | | CUT | T13 |
| The Tradition | – | | T28 | T17 | T15 | T54 | T65 | | T53 | T45 |
| Senior Players Championship | – | 1 | T18 | T15 | 2 | T35 | T54 | 48 | T24 | T37 |

| Tournament | 2000 | 2001 | 2002 | 2003 | 2004 | 2005 | 2006 | 2007 |
|---|---|---|---|---|---|---|---|---|
| Senior PGA Championship | T51 | 79 | CUT | CUT | 69 | CUT | 75 | CUT |
| Senior British Open Championship | – | – | – | CUT | | | | |
| U.S. Senior Open | T47 | T59 | CUT | CUT | | | | |
| The Tradition | T43 | T55 | T44 | T42 | T78 | T67 | T63 | 70 |
| Senior Players Championship | T60 | T10 | T30 | T48 | T58 | 75 | | |

Note: The Senior British Open Championship did not become a major until 2003.

Win
Top 10
Did not play

CUT = missed the halfway cut
"T" indicates a tie for a place

== U.S. national team appearances ==
- PGA Cup: 1977 (tie), 1981 (tie), 1982 (winners)

== See also ==
- List of people from Staten Island § Golf
