= Panama City Beach Classic =

Golf tournament

Nike Panama City Beach Classic
Tournament information
- Location: Panama City, Florida
- Established: 1990
- Course: Hombre Golf Course
- Par: 72
- Tour: Nike Tour
- Format: Stroke play
- Prize fund: US$175,000
- Month played: April
- Final year: 1994

Tournament record score
- Aggregate: 202 Keith Fergus (1994)
- To par: −14 as above

Final champion
- (United States) Keith Fergus
- Location in the United States Location in Florida

The Panama City Beach Classic was a golf tournament on the Nike Tour. It ran from 1990 to 1994. It was played at Hombre Golf Course in Panama City, Florida.

== Winners ==
Year	Winner	Score	To par	Margin of victory	Runner-up
Nike Panama City Beach Classic
1994	(United States) Keith Fergus	202	−14	2 strokes	(United States) Tommy Armour III
1993	(United States) Mike Schuchart	208	−8	2 strokes	(United States) Ron Streck
Ben Hogan Panama City Beach Classic
1992	(United States) Brian Kamm	210	−6	1 stroke	(United States) Jeff Gallagher
1991	(United States) Bruce Zabriski	208	−8	3 strokes	(United States) Buddy Gardner
1990	(United States) Buddy Gardner	209	−7	1 stroke	(United States) Brad Fabel
