= Michael Joyce =

Michael or Mike Joyce may refer to:

- Michael Joyce (writer) (born 1945), American author and professor of English
- Michael Joyce (tennis) (born 1973), American tennis player
- Michael S. Joyce (1942–2006), American conservative activist
- Michael T. Joyce (born 1949), judge of the Pennsylvania Superior Court
- Michael Joyce (Irish politician) (1851–1941), Member of Parliament for Limerick City, 1900–1918
- Mike Joyce (musician) (born 1963), English drummer for The Smiths
- Mike Joyce (baseball) (born 1941), former relief pitcher in Major League Baseball
- Mike Joyce (golfer) (born 1939), American professional golfer
