= Bruce Zabriski =

American professional golfer (born 1957)

Personal information
- Nationality: United States
- Born: August 3, 1957 (age 69) Southampton, New York, U.S.
- Height: 6 ft 4 in (1.93 m)
- Weight: 205 lb (93 kg; 14.6 st)
- Spouse: Sarah Marmion
- Children: 4

Career
- Sport: Golf
- Turned professional: 1980
- Former tours: PGA Tour; European Tour; Nationwide Tour
- Professional wins: 26

Number of wins by tour
- Korn Ferry Tour: 1
- Other: 25

Best results in major championships
- Masters Tournament: DNP
- PGA Championship: T68: 1998
- U.S. Open: T32: 1998
- The Open Championship: CUT: 1986

Bruce Zabriski (born August 3, 1957) is an American professional golfer. He has played on the PGA Tour, European Tour, and the Nationwide Tour.

== Career ==
In 1980, Zabriski turned pro. He joined the European Tour in 1985 and would play on the Tour until 1987. His best finish came at the Benson & Hedges International Open where he finished in a tie for 6th. He also recorded his best finish on the Order of Merit that year, finishing 103rd.

Zabriski joined the PGA Tour in 1988 earning his tour card at 1987 PGA Tour Qualifying School. He struggled in his rookie year and his best finish came at the Deposit Guaranty Golf Classic where he finished in a tie for twelfth, a career best. He played in five Nationwide Tour events in 1991 where he recorded three top-10 finishes including a win at the Ben Hogan Panama City Beach Classic. He rejoined the PGA Tour the following year, earning his card through qualifying school. In his second year on Tour he matched his career best finish on Tour at the United Airlines Hawaiian Open, finishing in a tie for twelfth.

=== Club professional ===
Zabriski was named assistant golf professional at Winged Foot Golf Club in Mamaroneck, New York from 1993 to 1995 and then at Westchester Country Club in Harrison, New York from 1995 to 1997. He became the head professional at Trump International Golf Club in West Palm Beach, Florida in 1998 and then moved to the Old Palm Golf Club in Palm Beach Gardens, Florida in 2002 where he was the Director of Golf.

Zabriski has also played extensively on the Metropolitan PGA and other club pro events with much success. Zabriski won the 1995 PGA Assistant Professional Championship and the 1997 PGA Professional National Championship. He was also the number one ranked PGA club professional player in the United States for three years in a row, from 1996-1998. Overall, Zabriski won 22 significant events in the New York metropolitan area, most on the local Met PGA.

Zabriski played in the Senior PGA Championship and the 2008 U.S. Senior Open but missed the cut in both events.

== Awards and honors ==
- Zabriski was named the National PGA Player of the Year five times: in 1991, 1994, 1996, 1997, and 1998.
- He earned the Metropolitan PGA Player of the Year five times: in 1989, 1991, 1993, 1996, and 1997.
- In 2006, Zabriski was named to the PGA President's Council on Growing the Game.

== Professional wins (26) ==
=== Ben Hogan Tour wins (1) ===
No.	Date	Tournament	Winning score	Margin of victory	Runner-up
1	Mar 24, 1991	Ben Hogan Panama City Beach Classic	−8 (69-67-72=208)	3 strokes	(United States) Buddy Gardner

=== Met PGA wins (21) ===
- 1984 New York State Open
- 1985 Bacardi Classic, Long Island Open
- 1986 Bacardi Classic
- 1989 Nissan Classic, Dodge Open, Long Island Open
- 1990 Dodge Open, Long Island PGA Championship
- 1991 Long Island Open, Long Island PGA Championship
- 1993 Dodge Open, Long Island Open, Long Island PGA Championship, Metropolitan Open
- 1995 Westchester Open, Westchester PGA Championship
- 1996 Metropolitan Open, Metropolitan PGA Championship
- 1997 Westchester Open
- 1998 Westchester Open

=== Other wins (2) ===
- 1995 PGA Assistant Professional Championship
- 1997 PGA Professional National Championship

=== Senior Met PGA wins (2) ===
- 2007 Metropolitan Golf Association Senior Open Championship
- 2012 Metropolitan Golf Association PGA Senior Championship

== Results in major championships ==
Tournament	1986	1987	1988	1989
U.S. Open	CUT			
The Open Championship	CUT			
PGA Championship				

Tournament	1990	1991	1992	1993	1994	1995	1996	1997	1998	1999	2000	2001	2002
U.S. Open		CUT							T32				
The Open Championship													
PGA Championship				CUT	CUT		CUT	CUT	T68			CUT	CUT

Note: Zabriski never played in the Masters Tournament.

Did not play

CUT = missed the half-way cut
"T" = tied

== U.S. national team appearances ==
- PGA Cup: 1998 (winners), 2003 (winners)

== See also ==
- 1987 PGA Tour Qualifying School graduates
- 1988 PGA Tour Qualifying School graduates
- 1991 PGA Tour Qualifying School graduates
