= Mike Joyce (golfer) =

American golfer (1939–2020)

Personal information
- Nationality: United States
- Born: May 2, 1939 Huntington, New York, U.S.
- Died: August 28, 2020 (aged 81) Palm Beach Gardens, Florida, U.S.

Career
- Sport: Golf
- Status: Professional
- Former tour: Champions Tour
- Professional wins: 4

Number of wins by tour
- PGA Tour Champions: 1
- Other: 3

Best results in major championships
- Masters Tournament: DNP
- PGA Championship: T73: 1973
- U.S. Open: CUT: 1973
- The Open Championship: DNP

Mike Joyce (May 2, 1939 – August 28, 2020) was an American professional golfer.

== Career ==
In 1989, Joyce joined the Senior PGA Tour, winning once, the 1992 GTE Northwest Classic. He played regularly on the Tour from 1989 to 1996 and last appeared in 2001.

== Personal life ==
Joyce's youngest brother Kevin was a member of the United States national basketball team at the 1972 Summer Olympics.

== Professional wins (4) ==
=== Regular career wins (3) ===
- 1982 Long Island Open
- 1983 Long Island PGA Championship
- 1988 Long Island PGA Championship

=== Senior PGA Tour wins (1) ===
| No. | Date | Tournament | Winning score | Margin of victory | Runner-up |
|---|---|---|---|---|---|
| 1 | Aug 23, 1992 | GTE Northwest Classic | −12 (70-70-64=204) | 2 strokes | (United States) Mike Hill |
