= Buddy Gardner =

American professional golfer (born 1955)

Personal information
- Full name: Frank Webb Gardner, Jr.
- Nationality: United States
- Born: August 24, 1955 (age 71) Montgomery, Alabama, U.S.
- Height: 5 ft 11 in (1.80 m)
- Weight: 175 lb (79 kg; 12.5 st)

Career
- Sport: Golf
- College: Auburn University
- Turned professional: 1977
- Former tour: PGA Tour
- Professional wins: 1

Number of wins by tour
- Korn Ferry Tour: 1

Best results in major championships
- Masters Tournament: CUT: 1986
- PGA Championship: T6: 1985
- U.S. Open: T37: 1991
- The Open Championship: WD: 1977

Frank Webb "Buddy" Gardner, Jr. (born August 24, 1955) is an American professional golfer.

== Early life and amateur career ==
Gardner was born in Montgomery, Alabama. He played college golf at Auburn University, where he was an All-American in 1977.

== Professional career ==
In 1977, Gardner turned professional. He played on the PGA Tour from 1978 to 1993. Four times he finished in second place: T-2 at the 1979 Joe Garagiola-Tucson Open, T-2 at the 1979 Anheuser-Busch Golf Classic, 2nd at the 1984 Houston Coca-Cola Open, and 2nd at the 1987 Big "I" Houston Open (lost to Jay Haas in a playoff). His best finish in a major was a T-6 at the 1985 PGA Championship.

Gardner played the Nike Tour from 1994 to 1997, while still playing some PGA Tour events. He had first played the tour in 1990, when he won the only event he entered, the Ben Hogan Panama City Beach Classic, held at the club he represented, the Hombre Golf Club.

== Amateur wins ==
- 1974 Alabama Amateur
- 1975 Alabama Amateur
- 1976 Dixie Amateur

== Professional wins (1) ==
=== Nike Tour wins (1) ===
No.	Date	Tournament	Winning score	Margin of victory	Runner-up
1	Mar 25, 1990	Ben Hogan Panama City Beach Classic	−7 (70-70-69=209)	1 stroke	(United States) Brad Fabel

Nike Tour playoff record (0–1)

No.	Year	Tournament	Opponent	Result
1	1995	Nike Alabama Classic	(United States) Jerry Kelly	Lost to par on first extra hole

== Playoff record ==
PGA Tour playoff record (0–1)

No.	Year	Tournament	Opponent	Result
1	1987	Big "I" Houston Open	(United States) Jay Haas	Lost to par on first extra hole

Other playoff record (0–1)

No.	Year	Tournament	Opponent	Result
1	1979	Magnolia Classic	(United States) Bobby Walzel	Lost to par on second extra hole

== Results in major championships ==
Tournament	1977	1978	1979
Masters Tournament			
U.S. Open			WD
The Open Championship	WD		
PGA Championship			

Tournament	1980	1981	1982	1983	1984	1985	1986	1987	1988	1989	1990	1991
Masters Tournament							CUT					
U.S. Open						CUT	CUT		T50	CUT		T37
The Open Championship												
PGA Championship	T65				CUT	T6	T36	T43		T17		CUT

Top 10
Did not play

CUT = missed the half-way cut
WD = withdrew
"T" = tied

== See also ==
- Fall 1977 PGA Tour Qualifying School graduates
- Fall 1978 PGA Tour Qualifying School graduates
- 1982 PGA Tour Qualifying School graduates
