= Long Island PGA Championship =

Golf tournament

Tournament information
- Location: Long Island, New York
- Established: 1935
- Month played: May

Current champion
- Matt Dobyns

The Long Island PGA Championship is a professional golf tournament played on Long Island, New York. It is sponsored by the Metropolitan section of the PGA of America. The current title of the event is the MasterCard Long Island PGA Championship.

== History ==
During the first half of the tournament's history, Al Brosch had great success at the event, winning the event nine times. By the end of this period, the event was jokingly referred to as a "benefit" for Brosch as he so reliably picked up the first place cheque.

In 1975, it transformed into a match play event. The champion was exempt but otherwise the field was determined during a one-round qualifier. In 1978, the local supermarket King Kullen began sponsoring the tournament. They helped provide a record $10,000 purse. King Kullen became the title sponsor in 1980. The tournament has been subsequently sponsored by Union Savings Bank, TaylorMade, Cobra Golf, and Mastercard.

== Winners ==
Year	Winner	Score	To par	Margin of victory	Runner-up	Ref.
Long Island PGA Championship
2026	Matt Dobyns	6 & 5			Lucas Spahl	
2025	Matt Dobyns	2 up			Paul Dickinson	
2024	Connor Costello	1 up			Jason Caron	
2023	Paul Dickinson	4 & 2			Jason Caron	
2022	Matt Dubrowski	1 up			Philip Cardwell	
2021	Rob Corcoran	1 up			Matt Dobyns	
2020	No tournament due to COVID-19 pandemic					
2019	Scott Ford					
2018	Mike Meehan	2 up			Rob Corcoran	
2017	Anthony Aruta					
2016	Anthony Aruta					
2015	Scott Ford					
2014	Tim Puetz					
2013	Nick Beddow					
2012	Darrell Kestner	4 & 3			Jamie Kilmer	
2011	Mark Mielke	19th hole			Rick Hartmann	
2010	Bill Van Orman	22nd hole			Bob Rittberger	
2009	Rick Hartmann	2 up			R.J. Ziats	
2008	Bob Rittberger	3 & 2			Darrell Kestner	
2007	Ron Faria	4 & 3			Rick Hartmann	
2006	Mark Brown	20th hole			Craig Thomas	
2005	Chris Case	1 up			Mike Mielke	
2004	John Guyton	4 & 3			Mike Mielke	
2003	Mark Brown	4 & 3			Craig Thomas	
MasterCard Long Island PGA Championship
2002	Darrell Kestner	3 & 2			Jack Forster	
2001	Darrell Kestner	2 & 1			Mike Gilmore	
2000	Rick Hartmann	19th hole			Michael Laudien	
1999	Rick Hartmann	2 & 1			Rick Meskell	
TaylorMade Long Island PGA Championship
1998	Rick Hartmann	2 & 1			Dave Gosiewski	
Cobra Long Island PGA Championship
1997	Bob Lendzion					
1996	Tom McGinnis				Paul Glut	
1995	Rick Meskell					
1994	Mark Diamond	3 & 2			Gene George	
1993	Bruce Zabriski	1 up			Ed Burke Jr.	
1992	Darrell Kestner	4 & 3			Carl Lohren	
1991	Bruce Zabriski	5 & 4			Terence Hughes	
Union Savings Bank Long Island PGA Championship
1990	Bruce Zabriski	8 & 7			Jon Kudysch	
1989	Tim Stafford	2 & 1			Dave Gosiewski	
1988	Mike Joyce	2 & 1			Jim Albus	
1987	Jon Kudysch	1 up			Fred Knoebel	
1986	Jim Albus	2 & 1			Tom Sutter	
1985	Roger Ginsberg	2 & 1			Rick Vershure	
King Kullen Long Island PGA Championship
1984	Carl Lohren	7 & 6			Doug Steffen	
1983	Mike Joyce	1 up			Tom Joyce	
1982	Mike Fetchick	1 up			Mike Joyce	
1981	Jim Albus	5 & 3			Bob Bruno	
1980	Jim Andrews	3 & 2			Larry Laoretti	
Long Island PGA Championship
1979	Jay Horton	3 & 2			Roger Ginsburg	
1978	Jim Delich	1 up			Rick Whitfield	
1977	Jim Delich	1 up			Mal Galletta Jr.	
1976	Jim Albus	2 & 1			Mal Galletta Jr.	
1975	Jim Albus	3 & 2			Roger Ginsburg	
1974	Jimmy Wright	66	−4	3 strokes	Harold Kolb; Larry Laoretti; Nunzio Ciampi	
1973	Jimmy Wright					
1972	Gene Borek	201	−15	5 strokes	Ron Letellier	
1971	Ron Letellier	210	−3	2 strokes	Gene Borek	
1970	Jimmy Wright	206	−4	1 stroke	Gene Borek	
1969	Gene Borek	213	−3	Playoff^{1}	Jimmy Wright	
1968	Jim Turnesa	216	E	4 strokes	Ron Letelier	
1967	Jerry Pittman	207		4 strokes	Mike Fetchick	
1966	Tom Nieporte	145				
1965	Gene Borek	203	−7	2 strokes	Frank Cardi	
1964	Mike Fetchick	208	−5	9 strokes	Dick Stranahan	
1963	Mike Fetchick					
1962	Tom Nieporte	215	+2	2 strokes	Ray Hayden	
1961	Joe Moresco					
1960	Al Brosch	216	+6	1 stroke	Shelley Mayfield	
1959	Al Brosch	137	−5	3 strokes	Tom Strafaci	
1958	Buck Luce	145		1 stroke	Shelley Mayfield	
1957	Don Brown	143	+3	Playoff^{2}	Shelley Mayfield	
1956	Gil Cavanaugh	140	−2	2 strokes	Shelley Mayfield	
1955	Jay Hebert	140	E	1 stroke	Fred Gronauer	
1954	Jack Mallon	143	+1	1 stroke	Steve Doctor, Henry Castillo	
1953	Jack Mallon	141	−1	1 stroke	Fred Gronauer	
1952	Fred Gronauer	141	−1	6 strokes	Pete Burke	
1951	Al Brosch	142		3 strokes	Jack Mallon	
1950	Al Brosch	139	−3	3 strokes	Len Peters	
1949	Al Brosch	135		4 strokes	Gus Norwich	
1948	Pat Cici	149	+5	Playoff^{3}	Jack Mallon	
1947	Al Brosch					
1946	No tournament					
1945	Pat Cici	149		1 stroke	Jack Mallon	
1944	Ernie Catropa	137	−5	11 strokes	Pat Cici	
1943	Wiffy Cox	148	+4	2 strokes	Willie Klein	
1942	Al Brosch	136	−6	6 strokes	Tony Longo	
1941	Jimmy Hines	147		Playoff^{4}	Willie Klein	
1940	Al Brosch	2 & 1			Joe Turnesa	
1939	Al Brosch	1 up			Jimmy Hines	
1938	Tony Longo	2 & 1			Henry Ciuci	
1937	Jimmy Hines					
1936	Walter Scheiber	142	E	2 strokes	Willie Klein	
1935	Charles Lacey					

^{1} Borek defeated Wright on the first sudden-death playoff hole with a par
^{2} Brown (71) defeated Mayfield (73) in an 18-hole playoff
^{3} Cici (74) defeated Mallon (75) in an 18-hole playoff
^{4} Hines (73) and Klein (73) defeated Catropa (79) in the first 18-hole playoff. Hines defeated Klein in the second playoff
