= Darrell Kestner =

American professional golfer

Personal information
- Nationality: United States
- Born: August 15, 1953 (age 73) Welch, West Virginia, U.S.
- Height: 6 ft 0 in (1.83 m)
- Weight: 185 lb (84 kg; 13.2 st)

Career
- Sport: Golf
- College: Concord College
- Turned professional: 1975
- Former tour: PGA Tour
- Professional wins: 22

Best results in major championships
- Masters Tournament: DNP
- PGA Championship: 78th: 2005
- U.S. Open: CUT: 1979, 1987, 1988, 1991, 1995, 1996, 2000, 2002
- The Open Championship: DNP

Darrell Kestner (born August 15, 1953) is an American professional golfer.

== Career ==
Kestner was born in Welch, West Virginia. He attended Concord College.

In 1975, Kestner turned professional.

Kestner works as a club professional but did play on the PGA Tour in 1981 and 1983. His best finish was a T-30 at the 1981 Tallahassee Open.

Kestner lives in Glen Cove, New York.

== Professional wins (22) ==
=== Tournament Players Series wins (1) ===
No.	Date	Tournament	Winning score	Margin of victory	Runners-up
1	27 May 1984	Charley Pride Golf Fiesta	−10 (70-67-69=206)	3 strokes	(United States) Rod Curl, (United States) Bob Tway, (United States) Howard Twitty

=== Metropolitan PGA Section wins (18) ===
- 1982 Metropolitan Open
- 1983 Metropolitan Open
- 1988 Westchester PGA Championship
- 1989 Westchester PGA Championship
- 1992 Long Island PGA Championship
- 1993 New York State Open
- 1994 Metropolitan PGA Championship, New York State Open
- 1995 Metropolitan Open, Metropolitan PGA Championship, Long Island Open
- 1997 Metropolitan PGA Championship
- 2001 Long Island PGA Championship
- 2002 Long Island PGA Championship
- 2003 Metropolitan PGA Championship
- 2004 Metropolitan PGA Championship
- 2006 Long Island Open
- 2012 Long Island PGA Championship

=== Other wins (3) ===
- 1982 Footjoy PGA Assistant Professional Championship
- 1987 PGA Assistant Professional Championship
- 1996 PGA Professional Championship

== Results in major championships ==
Tournament	1979	1980	1981	1982	1983	1984	1985	1986	1987	1988	1989
U.S. Open	CUT								CUT	CUT	
PGA Championship										CUT	

Tournament	1990	1991	1992	1993	1994	1995	1996	1997	1998	1999
U.S. Open		CUT				CUT	CUT			
PGA Championship		CUT	CUT	CUT	CUT	CUT		CUT		CUT

Tournament	2000	2001	2002	2003	2004	2005	2006	2007	2008	2009
U.S. Open	CUT		CUT							
PGA Championship		CUT				78				

Tournament	2010	2011	2012
U.S. Open			
PGA Championship			CUT

Note: Kestner only played in the U.S. Open and the PGA Championship.

Did not play

CUT = missed the half way cut
"T" indicates a tie for a place.

== U.S. national team appearances ==
- PGA Cup: 1998 (winners)

== See also ==
- Fall 1980 PGA Tour Qualifying School graduates
- 1982 PGA Tour Qualifying School graduates
