= Bethpage Black Course =

Golf course on Long Island, New York

- Location within the United States Location within New York
- 40.742°N 73.455°W

Club information
- Location: Bethpage State Park; Farmingdale, New York, U.S.
- Elevation: 125 feet (40 m)
- Established: 1936; 90 years ago
- Type: Public
- Total holes: 18
- Tournaments: PGA Championship (2019); U.S. Open (2002, 2009); The Barclays (2012, 2016); Ryder Cup (2025)
- Greens: Poa annua
- Fairways: Ryegrass / Poa annua
- Website: bethpagegolfcourse.com

Black Course
- Designed by: Joseph H. Burbeck & A. W. Tillinghast (1936), Rees Jones (2015 renovation)
- Par: 71
- Length: 7,468 yards (6,829 m)
- Course rating: 77.5
- Slope rating: 155
- Course record: 63 – Brooks Koepka (2019); Ryan Siegler (2022 Met Open)

The Bethpage Black Course is a public golf course at Bethpage State Park on Long Island, New York. The course was designed by Joseph H. Burbeck, who was assisted by golf architect A. W. Tillinghast. It is the most difficult of Bethpage's five courses, and has a warning sign at the first tee, placed in the 1960s , which reads "WARNING[:] The Black Course Is An Extremely Difficult Course Which We Recommend Only For Highly Skilled Golfers". The course has hosted a number of important tournaments, including the 2002 U.S. Open, 2009 U.S. Open, 2019 PGA Championship, and 2025 Ryder Cup.

== Rankings ==
In its July 2008 list of America's greatest golf courses Golf Digest ranked Bethpage Black No. 26 overall, No. 6 in the state of New York, No. 6 of America's 50 toughest courses, and No. 5 of America's greatest public golf courses. It is also the top-ranked course in the Golf Digest list that is operated by a governmental entity. In September 2020, Golf Advisor ranked Bethpage Black as No. 1 overall in a list of the top 50 toughest golf courses in the United States.

== Scorecard ==
Bethpage State Park - Black Course
Tee	Rating/Slope	1	2	3	4	5	6	7	8	9	Out	10	11	12	13	14	15	16	17	18	In	Total
2019 PGA		430	389	230	517	478	408	524	210	460	3646	502	435	515	608	161	484	490	207	411	3813	7459
2009 U.S. Open		430	389	232	517	478	408	525	210	460	3649	508	435	504	605	158	459	490	207	411	3777	7426
2002 U.S. Open		430	389	205	517	451	408	489	210	418	3517	492	435	499	554	161	459	479	207	411	3697	7214
Par	U.S. Open&PGA	4	4	3	5	4	4	4	3	4	35	4	4	4	5	3	4	4	3	4	35	70
The Barclays 2012&2016		430	389	230	517	478	408	553	210	460	3675	502	435	501	608	161	478	490	207	411	3793	7468
Blue	77.5 / 155	430	389	230	517	478	408	553	210	460	3675	502	435	501	608	161	478	490	207	411	3793	7468
White	74.2 / 148	429	354	158	461	423	386	502	191	385	3289	434	421	432	480	152	430	457	195	394	3395	6684
Red	71.2 / 137	426	346	128	438	401	376	489	152	293	3049	377	412	403	472	139	417	431	178	345	3174	6223
Par		4	4	3	5	4	4	5	3	4	36	4	4	4	5	3	4	4	3	4	35	71
SI		8	16	18	2	4	10	6	14	12		9	11	7	3	17	1	5	13	15

- Hole #7 was played as a par 4 in both U.S. Opens

== History ==
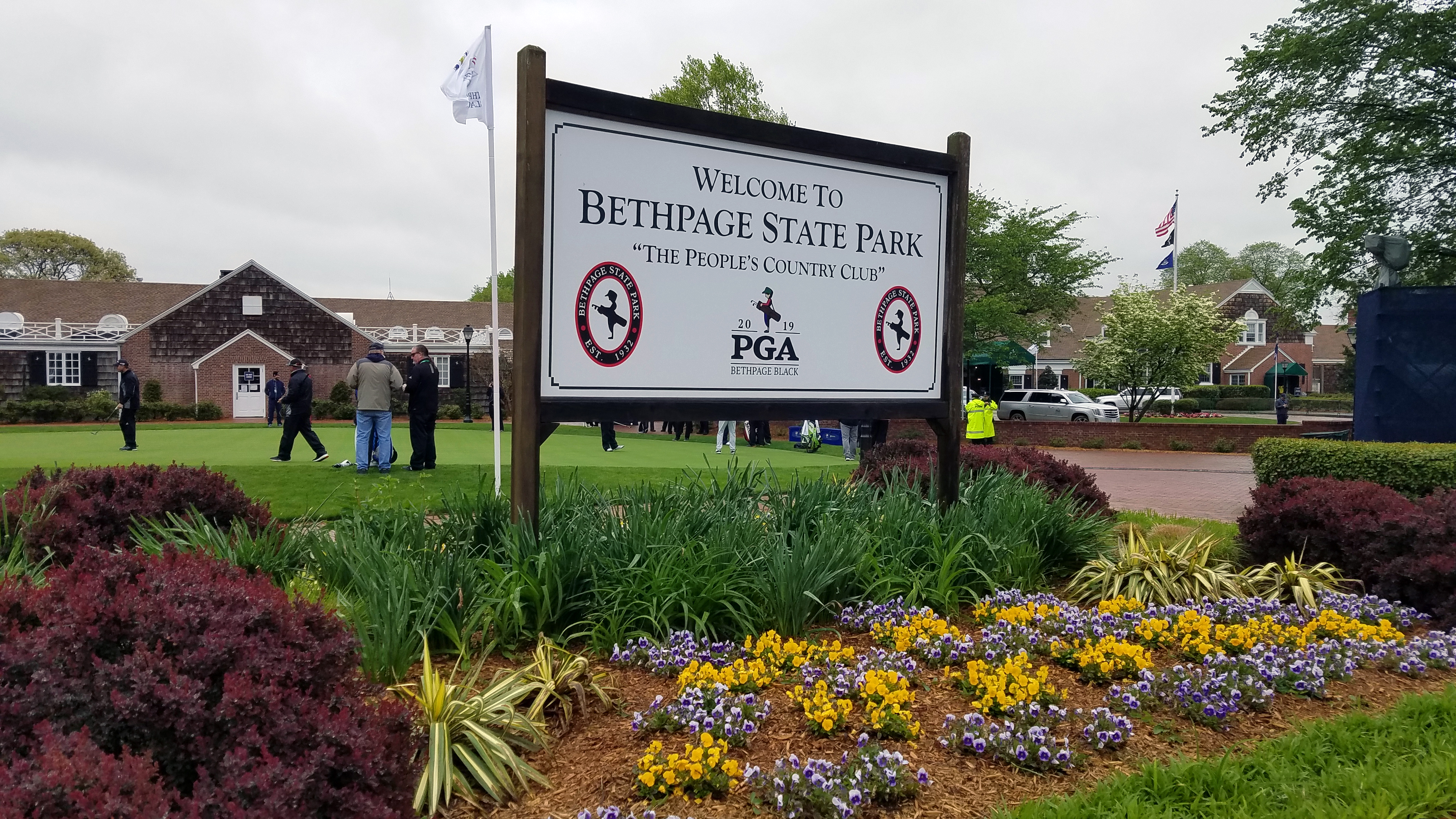
Bethpage Clubhouse during the 2019 PGA Championship

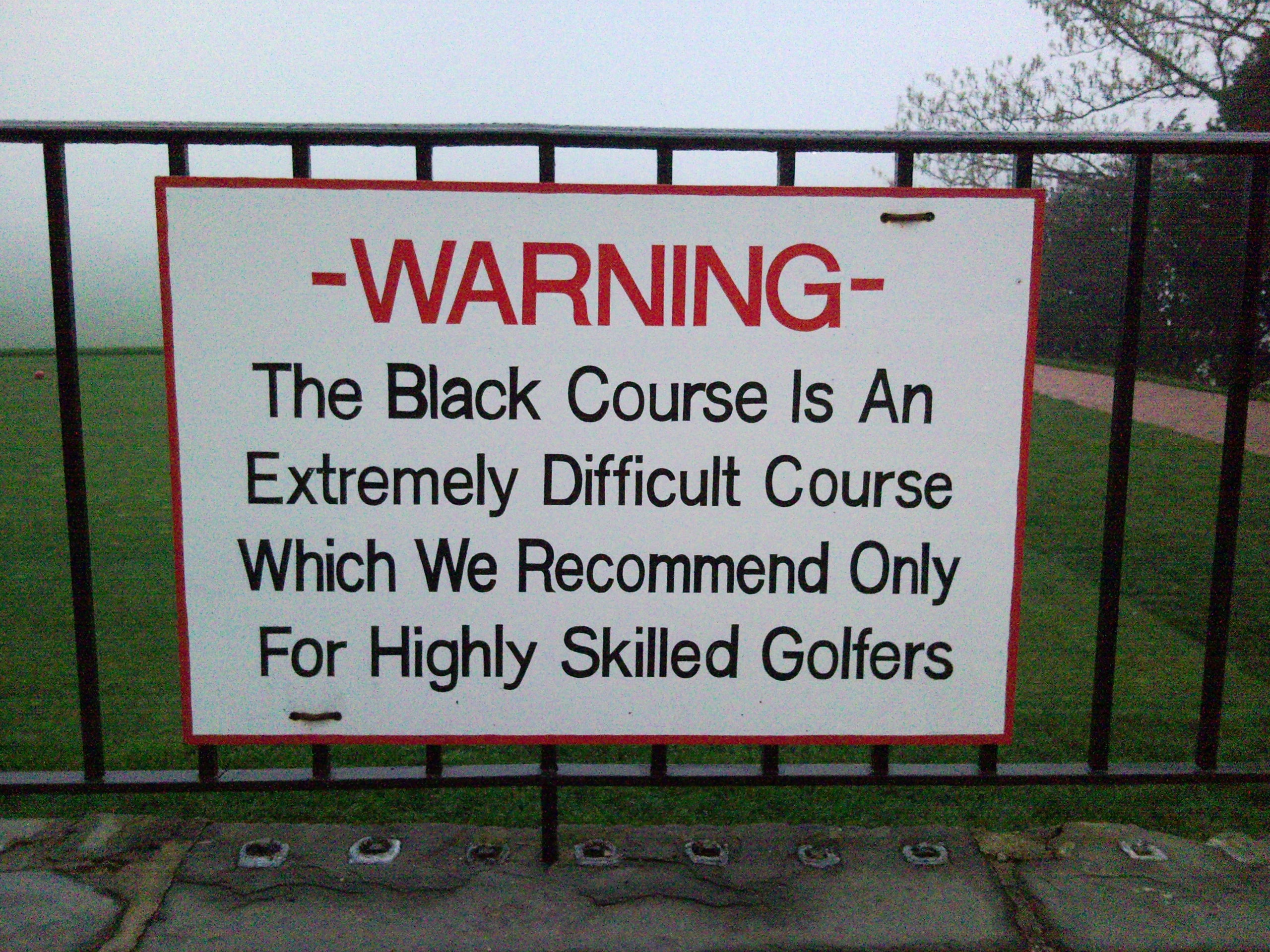
Warning sign entering the first tee box

Opened in 1936, it was designed by Bethpage State Park superintendent Joseph H. Burbeck, who was also responsible for the park's Blue and Red Courses in the mid-1930s. Brief consultation was also provided by noted golf architect A. W. Tillinghast.

In 1972, the course record was set by Mal Galletta Jr. when he shot a 65. Club pro Rick Hartmann tied the record in 2001 during the second round of the Metropolitan Open. The course record was finally broken in 2019 by Brooks Koepka who fired an opening round 63 during the PGA Championship. Ryan Siegler tied the course record during the second round of the 2022 Metropolitan Open.

=== U.S. Opens ===
The 2002 U.S. Open was won by Tiger Woods, the only player to break par for the tournament. It was seen as one of the most difficult and exciting U.S. Opens in history, breaking attendance records and creating a more boisterous atmosphere for the championship. Its 17th hole rivaled the 16th at the Phoenix Open, thanks to a pair of large grandstands that flanked the green and a natural hill behind it creating a giant horseshoe of spectators.

Prior to 2002, all U.S. Opens had been staged at private golf venues or infrequently at resorts that, while nominally open to the public, had several hundred dollar greens fees per round. Bethpage being selected in 2002 as the first publicly owned and operated golf course to host the tournament was seen as an egalitarian move by the USGA.

The 2009 U.S. Open was fraught by continuous rain that resulted in multiple suspensions of play. It was won by Lucas Glover. 2002 winner Tiger Woods was never a realistic contender, and left the park within ten minutes of sinking his final putt. After completing his round Phil Mickelson declared that he would be taking significant time off to tend to his ailing wife, Amy, who had been recently diagnosed with breast cancer.

As in 2002, media coverage of the relationship between the New York gallery and Mickelson was one of the tournament's major headlines. The most memorable moment occurred following his tee shot on the short par-3 17th hole, where he was met by thunderous chants of "Let's Go!" as he approached the green. Though his birdie putt came up short, he later commended the New York golf fans and suggested a Ryder Cup played at Bethpage Black would give U.S. players "a big advantage."

The USGA teamed up with World Golf Tour and co-hosted a 2009 Virtual US Open tournament to give fans a better experience of playing the difficult Black course. The winner earned a trip for two to the 2010 event in Pebble Beach. The Virtual U.S. Open attracted hundreds of thousands of players from more than 180 countries.

=== Recent tournaments ===
The annual Barclays tournament, the first of FedEx Cup playoff events, continued its rotation around the New York metropolitan area and was played at Bethpage State Park in 2012 in late August. As with the previous two U.S. Opens, the 2012 Barclays was played on the difficult Black course. Differing from the U.S. Opens, the 7th hole was lengthened slightly and played as a par-5 to make the course a par-71 at 7,468 yards (6,829 m), identical to the course's blue tees.

The Barclays returned for August 25–28, 2016. A total of 79 of its 120 entrants made the second-round cut at 145 (+3). Despite this total there was no secondary cut after the third round as in regular PGA Tour events, following a change made after the 2014 season. Patrick Reed won by a stroke over Emiliano Grillo and Sean O'Hair, moving from seventh place to first in the standings. The top 100 players in the points standings advanced to the Deutsche Bank Championship. This included five players who were outside the top 100 prior to the tournament. Five players also started within the top 100 but finished outside it, ending their playoff chances. The tournament was the last qualifying event for the eight qualifying places for the American team in the 2016 Ryder Cup.

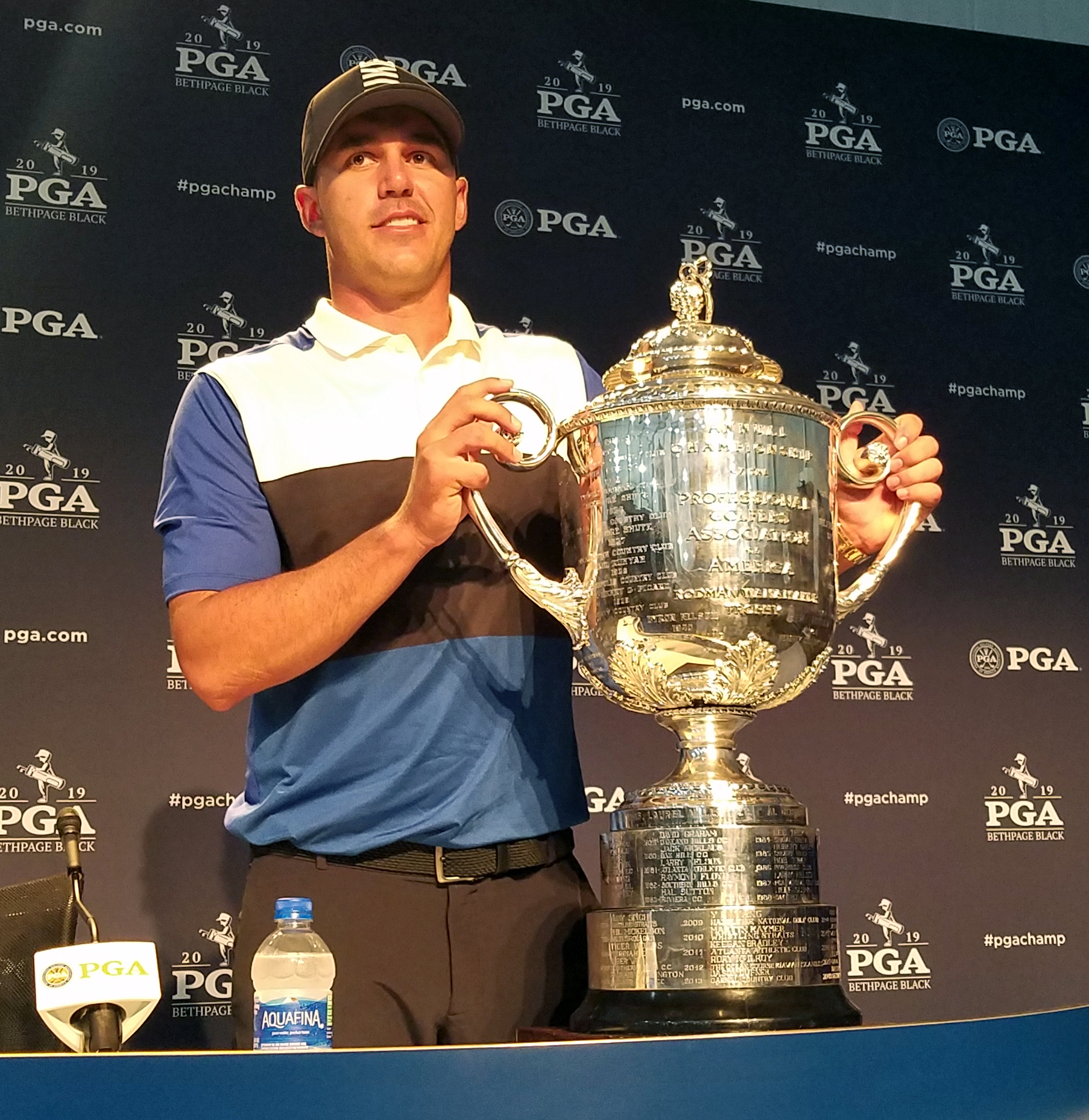
Brooks Koepka, 2019 PGA Champion

The 2019 PGA Championship was played at the Bethpage Black Course from May 16 to May 19. Brooks Koepka won the tournament by two strokes at 8 under par.

The 2025 Ryder Cup was played at the Bethpage Black Course from September 26 to 28. Bethpage was selected to host the 2024 Ryder Cup in 2013 along with the 2019 PGA Championship. The Ryder Cup was postponed in 2020 due to the COVID-19 pandemic and returned to its original cycle of being played in odd years. The European Ryder Cup Team won the event 15–13, becoming the first away team to win the event since 2012.

== Notable events ==
Year	Date	Tournament	Winner	Score	To par	Margin of victory	Runner(s)-up	Classification
2025	Sep 28	Ryder Cup	Europe	28 matches		15 to 13	United States	International competition
2019	May 19	PGA Championship	(United States) Brooks Koepka	272	−8	2 strokes	(United States) Dustin Johnson	Major championship
2016	Aug 28	The Barclays*	(United States) Patrick Reed	275	−9	1 stroke	(Argentina) Emiliano Grillo (United States) Sean O'Hair	FedEx Cup playoffs
2012	Aug 26	The Barclays*	(United States) Nick Watney	274	−10	3 strokes	(United States) Brandt Snedeker	FedEx Cup playoffs
2009	Jun 22	U.S. Open	(United States) Lucas Glover	276	−4	2 strokes	(United States) Ricky Barnes (United States) David Duval (United States) Phil Mickelson	Major championship
2002	Jun 16	U.S. Open	(United States) Tiger Woods	277	−3	3 strokes	(United States) Phil Mickelson	Major championship

* The Barclays is now known as the FedEx St. Jude Championship.

== Future events ==
Year	Event	Type	Times hosted
2028	Women's PGA Championship	Women's major	Inaugural
2033	PGA Championship	Men's major	1 (2019)
