= Willie Tucker =

American professional golfer (1872–1954)

Willie Tucker, Sr.
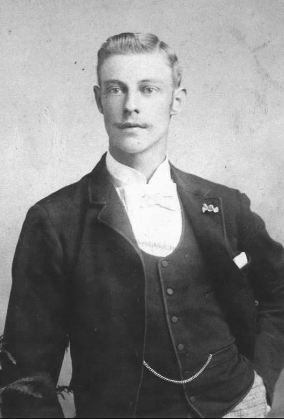
- Tucker, c. 1904

Personal information
- Full name: William Henry Tucker, Sr.
- Nationality: England; United States
- Born: 15 August 1872 England
- Died: 6 October 1954 (aged 82) Albuquerque, New Mexico

Career
- Sport: Golf
- Turned professional: c. 1890

Best results in major championships
- Masters Tournament: DNP
- PGA Championship: DNP
- U.S. Open: T7: 1896
- The Open Championship: T37: 1894

William Henry Tucker, Sr. (15 August 1872 – 6 October 1954) was an American professional golfer and golf course architect of English birth. Tucker placed seventh in the 1896 U.S. Open, held 18 July at Shinnecock Hills Golf Club in Southampton, New York.

Although a fine golfer, the bulk of his career would not be spent as a tournament player but rather as a golf course architect.

== Early life ==
Tucker was born in England on 15 August 1872. He was the son of William Henry Tucker and Katherine Dunn who had married in Scotland earlier in 1872. Katherine was daughter of Willie Dunn, Sr. and the sister of Tom Dunn and Willie Dunn. William Henry Tucker was a gardener from Devon. After being widowed, Katherine also emigrated to the United States and lived with Tucker. She was still alive in 1930.

Tucker had three younger brothers, Samuel, John and Thomas, who also emigrated to the United States. His brother John Dunn Tucker was the first professional at Pinehurst and designed the second nine holes of the number 1 course.

As a youngster Tucker was taught how to play golf by his father, a green keeper at Wimbledon Common Golf Club. He also became a proficient sod roller but rather than golf course maintenance he yearned for a career as a professional golfer.

== Golf career ==
At first, he moved to Biarritz, France, where he worked for Willie Dunn. He didn't stay there long and soon returned to London where he worked as a club maker for Slazenger. He was the professional at Redhill & Reigate Golf Club in the early 1890s, playing in the 1894 Open Championship. He emigrated to the United States in 1895 and went to work with his brother Sam who was the professional at St. Andrew's Golf Club in Yonkers, New York. The brothers manufactured hand-made golf clubs that they marketed under the name "Defiance". While at St. Andrew's, Willie helped with the design of St. Andrew's Mount Hope course. Later he designed such courses as the original North Hills in Douglaston and built the present 27-hole Ridgewood Country Club course in Paramus, New Jersey, for A. W. Tillinghast.

=== 1896 U.S. Open ===
The 1896 U.S. Open was the second U.S. Open, held July 18 at Shinnecock Hills Golf Club in Southampton, New York. Tucker finished in seventh place with rounds of 78-82=160 and won $5. His brother Sam had played in the 1895 U.S. Open and finished in the ninth position. James Foulis won the tournament, his only major, finishing three strokes ahead of runner-up Horace Rawlins, the defending champion. Like the first Open, it was a sideshow to the more established and better known U.S. Amateur. However, there were 35 entrants and 28 finished the 36 holes.

=== Golf course architecture ===
Tucker designed the St. Martin's course at the Philadelphia Cricket Club. It is named "St. Martin's" after the adjacent episcopal church, St. Martin's in the Fields. The club originally opened a 9-hole course in 1895, which was quickly replaced by the 18-hole St. Martin's course in 1898, designed by Willie Tucker. This course hosted the U.S. Open championships in 1907 and 1910, won by Alec Ross and Alex Smith, respectively. Today, this course has been reduced to a 9-hole layout. Despite the reduction, the 7th, 8th, and 9th holes are the same layout as they were played during the 1907 and 1910 U.S. Open championship.

Tucker was one of the early pioneers in American golf course architecture. He designed at least four courses in the Queens, New York, area – including Douglaston Golf Club and Clearview Golf Club – and in the American midwest at Salt Lake City, Utah, and courses as far west as Washington state. In 1895 he designed the original Denver Country club course which today is Overland Park golf course, the oldest golf course west of the Mississippi. He built a golf course at the University of New Mexico and designed the Preakness Hills Country Club in Wayne, New Jersey, the latter completed in 1926.

== Family ==
Tucker was married to Annie Ada, née Jeal (1873-1951). They had a son, Willie Tucker, Jr., who was also a golf course architect.

== Death and legacy ==
Tucker died on 6 October 1954 in Albuquerque, New Mexico. The Championship Course at the University of New Mexico, designed by Tucker, has been home to the William H. Tucker Invitational for the past 43 years. The tournament is the second longest running college tournament in the U.S. and the golf course hosted the 61st playing of the event in 2015.
