= John Harland (golfer) =

English golfer (born c. 1870)

Personal information
- Full name: John Harland
- Nationality: England; United States
- Born: England

Career
- Sport: Golf
- Status: Professional

Best results in major championships
- Masters Tournament: DNP
- U.S. Open: T7: 1895

John Harland (born c. 1870) was an English professional golfer. Harland tied for seventh place in the 1895 U.S. Open, held on Friday, October 4, at Newport Golf Club in Newport, Rhode Island. Horace Rawlins won the inaugural U.S. Open title, two strokes ahead of runner-up Willie Dunn. Harland had five top-40 finishes in the U.S. Open.

== Early life ==
Harland was born in Lewisham, England, on 29 February 1876.

== Golf career ==
Harland posted rounds of 93-90=183 and tied for seventh place in the 1895 U.S. Open, held on Friday, October 4, at Newport Golf Club in Newport, Rhode Island. Horace Rawlins won the inaugural U.S. Open title, two strokes ahead of runner-up Willie Dunn. Harland was the professional and green keeper at the Weston Golf Club in Weston, Massachusetts.

== Results in major championships ==
Tournament	1895	1896	1897	1898	1899	1900	1901	1902	1903	1904	1905	1906	1907	1908	1909	1909	1910	1911	1912
U.S. Open	T7	?	?	17	?	?	T28	T20	T36	DNP	DNP	DNP	DNP	DNP	DNP	DNP	DNP	DNP	40

Note: Harland played only in the U.S. Open.

"T" indicates a tie for a place
Yellow background for top-10
? = Unknown
DNP = Did not play

== Death and legacy ==
Harland's date of death is unknown. He is best remembered as a frequent competitor in the U.S. Open in the late 19th and early 20th century.
