= John Reid (golfer) =

Scottish golfer (1870–1946)

Personal information
- Full name: John Reid Jr.
- Nationality: Scotland
- Born: c. 1870 Scotland
- Died: 8 October 1946 Yonkers, New York, U.S.

Career
- Sport: Golf
- Status: Professional

Best results in major championships
- Masters Tournament: DNP
- PGA Championship: DNP
- U.S. Open: 10th: 1895
- The Open Championship: DNP

John Reid Jr. (born c. 1870 – 8 October 1946) was a Scottish professional golfer. He finished in tenth place in the 1895 U.S. Open.

== Early life ==
Reid was born circa 1870 in Scotland and emigrated to the United States.

== Golf career ==
=== 1895 U.S. Open ===
Reid finished in tenth place in the 1895 U.S. Open, held on Friday, 4 October, at Newport Golf Club in Newport, Rhode Island. Horace Rawlins won the tournament which was the first playing of the U.S. Open. He won by two strokes ahead of runner-up Willie Dunn. Reid carded rounds of 100-106=206 and did not receive any prize money for his effort.

=== Match against Harry Vardon ===
In October 1900, Reid and Val Fitzjohn took on Harry Vardon in a match at Albany, New York. A cold rain pelted the players and spectators during the event which Vardon won by the score of 2 up.

=== Match against Walter Fovargue ===
Reid had much better luck in a high stakes winner-take-all challenge match for $200 against Walter Fovargue in 1903 that was played at the Philadelphia Cricket Club. He defeated Fovargue and took home the hefty $200 prize. The first prize at the U.S. Open that year was only $150.

== Death ==
Reid died at his home in Yonkers, New York on 8 October 1946 at the age of 76.
