= John Patrick (golfer) =

Scottish golfer

Personal information
- Full name: John Patrick
- Nationality: Scotland
- Born: Scotland

Career
- Sport: Golf
- Status: Professional

Best results in major championships
- Masters Tournament: DNP
- U.S. Open: T7: 1895

John Patrick was a Scottish professional golfer. Patrick placed tied for seventh in the 1895 U.S. Open, held on Friday, 4 October, at Newport Golf Club in Newport, Rhode Island. Horace Rawlins won the inaugural U.S. Open title, two strokes ahead of runner-up Willie Dunn.
