= Samuel Tucker (golfer) =

English golfer

Personal information
- Full name: Samuel Tucker
- Nationality: England
- Born: c. 1875 England

Career
- Sport: Golf
- Status: Professional

Best results in major championships
- Masters Tournament: DNP
- PGA Championship: DNP
- U.S. Open: 9th: 1895
- The Open Championship: DNP

Samuel Tucker (born c. 1875) was an English professional golfer. Tucker placed ninth in the 1895 U.S. Open, held on Friday, 4 October, at Newport Golf Club in Newport, Rhode Island.

== Early life ==
Tucker was born in England circa 1875.

== Golf career ==
Tucker was the professional at Dyker Meadow Golf Club in Brooklyn, New York, in 1898, where Mungo Park had also been posted, but thereafter left for a job at Allegheny Country Club.

=== 1895 U.S. Open ===
Tucker finished in ninth place in the 1895 U.S. Open which was the inaugural U.S. Open. He posted rounds of 97-88=185 but failed to win any prize money. His brother Willie played in the tournament in 1896, finishing in eighth place. The winner was Horace Rawlins, two strokes ahead of runner-up Willie Dunn. He was entered to play in the 1896 U.S. Open but for withdrew after a first round 88. He competed again in 1897 and finished tied for 25th place after rounds of 87 and 98.

== Death ==
Tucker's date and place of death are unknown.

== Results in major championships ==
Tournament	1895	1896	1897
U.S. Open	9	WD	T25

Note: Tucker played only in the U.S. Open.

Yellow background for top-10
WD = Withdrew
"T" indicates a tie for a place
