= 1897 U.S. Open (golf) =

Coordinates: 41.849°N 88.115°W

Tournament information
- Dates: September 17, 1897
- Location: Wheaton, Illinois
- Course: Chicago Golf Club
- Organized by: USGA
- Format: Stroke play − 36 holes

Statistics
- Field: 35
- Prize fund: $335
- Winner's share: $150

Champion
- (England) Joe Lloyd
- 162

Location in the United States
Location in Illinois

The 1897 U.S. Open was the third U.S. Open, held September 17 at Chicago Golf Club in Wheaton, Illinois, a suburb west of Chicago. Joe Lloyd won his only major title by one stroke over runner-up Willie Anderson.

Following the first round on Friday morning, Anderson began the final round in the afternoon four clear of Lloyd, who shot a 79 over the last 18 holes to Anderson's 84 to finish a stroke ahead. Lloyd's win was capped by a three at the 461-yard (422 m) finishing hole. Anderson needed a four at the last to tie Lloyd; he reached the green in three, but his putt came up 6 feet (1.8 m) short. Anderson waited four more years for first of his record four U.S. Open titles in five years.

This was the last year that the U.S. Open and U.S. Amateur championships were played simultaneously on the same course. It was the last time the U.S. Open was only 36 holes total, doubling to 72 holes in 1898.

== Course ==
Hole	Name	Yards	Par	Hole	Name	Yards	Par
1	Burn	460	5	10	Pond (In)	140	3
2	East	330	4	11	Lodge (In)	270	4
3	Corner	340	4	12	Hillside	330	4
4	Gables	415	4	13	Long (In)	500	5
5	Far	320	4	14	Mound	290	4
6	Long (Out)	520	5	15	Gopher	350	4
7	Lodge (Out)	285	4	16	Horseshoe	310	4
8	Ginger Ale	260	4	17	Home View	320	4
9	Pond (Out)	160	3	18	Home	420	5
Out		3,090	37	In		2,930	37
Total		6,020	74				

== Round summaries ==
=== First round ===
Friday, September 17, 1897 (morning)

Place	Player	Score
1	(Scotland) Willie Anderson	79
2	(Scotland) James Foulis	80
3	(England) Willie Hoare	82
T4	(England) Joe Lloyd	83
T4	(Scotland) Buff Wilson	83
6	(Scotland) Harry Turpie	85
T7	(Scotland) David Foulis	86
T7	(United States) Jim Tyng (a)	86
T9	(Scotland) Willie Dunn Jr.	87
T9	(Scotland) William Marshall	87
T9	(England) Bernard Nicholls	87
T9	(England) Samuel Tucker	87
T9	(Scotland) H. J. Whigham (a)	87

(a) denotes amateur

=== Final round ===
Friday, September 17, 1897 (afternoon)

Place	Player	Score	Money ($)
1	(England) Joe Lloyd	83-79=162	150
2	(Scotland) Willie Anderson	79-84=163	100
T3	(Scotland) Willie Dunn Jr.	87-81=168	38
T3	(Scotland) James Foulis	80-88=168	38
5	(England) Willie Hoare	82-87=169	10
T6	(England) Bernard Nicholls	87-85=172	0
T6	(England) Alfred Ricketts	91-81=172	0
T8	(Scotland) David Foulis	86-87=173	0
T8	(England) Horace Rawlins	91-82=173	0
T8	(Scotland) H. J. Whigham (a)	87-86=173	0

Amateurs: Whigham (173), Macdonald (174), Tyng (177), Douglas (180),
Stewart (181), Emmet (188), Smith (189), Keene (192),
Reid (194), Sweny (194), Bowers (199).
