= Buff Wilson =

Scottish golfer (1868–1947)

Personal information
- Full name: Robert Black Wilson
- Nickname: Buff
- Nationality: Scotland
- Born: 19 August 1868 Anstruther, Scotland
- Died: 19 November 1947 (aged 79) Cupar, Scotland

Career
- Sport: Golf
- Status: Professional

Best results in major championships
- Masters Tournament: DNP
- PGA Championship: DNP
- U.S. Open: 9th: 1896
- The Open Championship: 22nd: 1890

Robert Black "Buff" Wilson (19 August 1868 – 19 November 1947) was a Scottish professional golfer who played in the late 19th and early 20th century. Wilson placed ninth in the 1896 U.S. Open, held 18 July at Shinnecock Hills Golf Club in Southampton, New York. He played in the 1897 U.S. Open and finished T11. He had two starts in the Open Championship, in 1890 and 1893, and finished in 22nd and 33rd place, respectively.

== Early life ==
Wilson was born on 19 August 1868 in Anstruther, Scotland. He was in business as a clubmaker in the 1890s and produced fine long-nosed woods. He carved his signature on the clubs he made in an oval configuration on the top of the clubhead, the markings reading: "R B Wilson, Maker, St Andrews". He learned his trade as a clubmaker when he apprenticed under Old Tom Morris at St Andrews. He obtained patents on several of his golf club designs, including a mashie-cleek for approach shots; it was a popular item in his shop—he sold 1,200 clubs in 1898 alone.

He first posting as a professional was at Minchinhampton where he also designed the course. After intermediate stops at Sheffield, Sidcup, and Beckenham he set sail for the United States and took up a posting at Shinnecock Hills Golf Club, Long Island.

In 1898, Wilson became the second head professional at the Huntingdon Valley Country Club in Philadelphia. His tenure there was short and in 1899 he accepted the head professional position at the Country Club of Lakewood in Lakewood, New Jersey. While at Lakewood, Wilson remodeled the original Horace Rowlins design.

He also worked at Lakewood Golf Club in New Jersey. In the winter months, he always returned to St Andrews and went back into his workshop producing more clubs, most of which he exported to the U.S. He was posted at the Wentorf Reinbek Club in Germany in 1905 but stayed only a short time before returning to Scotland.

== Golf career ==
=== 1896 U.S. Open ===
Wilson placed ninth in the 1896 U.S. Open, held 18 July at Shinnecock Hills Golf Club in Southampton, New York. He carded rounds of 82-80=162. James Foulis won the tournament, three strokes ahead of runner-up Horace Rawlins, the defending champion.

== Death ==
Wilson died on 19 November 1947 in Cupar, Scotland, at the age of 79.

== Results in major championships ==
Tournament	1888	1889	1890	1891	1892	1893	1894	1895	1896	1897	1898	1899
U.S. Open	NYF	NYF	NYF	NYF	NYF	NYF	NYF	DNP	9	T11	DNP	T36
The Open Championship	?	DNP	22	DNP	DNP	33	DNP	WD	DNP	DNP	DNP	DNP

Note: Wilson only played in the Open Championship and the U.S. Open.
NYF = Tournament not yet founded
DNP = Did not play
WD = Withdrew
? = finish unknown
"T" indicates a tie for a place
Yellow background for top-10
