= David Foulis (golfer) =

Scottish professional golfer (1868–1950)

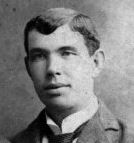
- Foulis in 1903

Personal information
- Nationality: Scotland; United States
- Born: 19 April 1868 St Andrews, Scotland
- Died: 11 June 1950 (aged 82) Chicago, Illinois, U.S.
- Spouse: Janet Fowler
- Children: 2

Career
- Sport: Golf
- Status: Professional

Best results in major championships
- Masters Tournament: DNP
- PGA Championship: DNP
- U.S. Open: T8: 1897
- The Open Championship: DNP

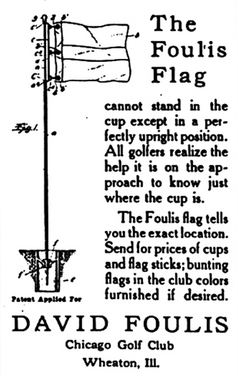
Foulis golf flag support invention

David Foulis (19 April 1868 – 11 June 1950) was a Scottish-American professional golfer who played in the late 19th century and early 20th century. Foulis tied for eighth place in the 1897 U.S. Open, held at the Chicago Golf Club in Wheaton, Illinois. He was the inventor of the golf hole cup liner or "golf flag support" and received a patent for the invention in 1912. He and his brother James were co-inventors of the modern 7-iron, which they called a "mashie-niblick".

== Early life ==
Foulis was born on 19 April 1868 in the family home at 9 Crails Lane in St Andrews, Scotland, to James Foulis (1841–1925) and Helen Ann Foulis (née Jamieson) (1847–1928). At age 23 he was working as an ironmonger's assistant. He emigrated to the United States in 1896 and became a naturalized American citizen. He married Janet Fowler in 1898 and they had two children, Jessie Helen Foulis (1899–1973) and James Ronald Foulis (1903–1969). His son James played in the first Masters tournament in 1934, carding rounds of 78-74-76-72=300.

== Golf career ==
Foulis played in the 1897 U.S. Open held at Chicago Golf Club in Wheaton, Illinois, where his brother James was the head professional. He scored rounds of 86-87=173 and tied for eighth place with Horace Rawlins and H. J. Whigham. None of the three competitors won any prize money.

In 1905 Foulis succeeded his brother James as the professional at Chicago Golf Club where he remained until 1916. In 1921 David became the professional and greenskeeper at the Hinsdale Golf Club in Chicago where he remained until his retirement in 1939. Foulis and his brother James were the proprietors of the J & D Foulis Company of Chicago, producing golf clubs and "American Eagle" golf balls until 1921.

=== Golf flag support invention ===
He was the inventor of the "golf flag support" and received a patent on 5 April 1912 for the invention.

=== Mashie-Niblick invention ===
David and his brother James played a significant part in the evolution of golf equipment. They invented the bramble patterning for Coburn Haskell's new rubber-cored ball. In response to the demands of the new ball they developed the "mashie-niblick", the modern 7-iron, which fell between the traditional mashie (5-iron) and niblick (9-iron), and patented the design.

== Family ==
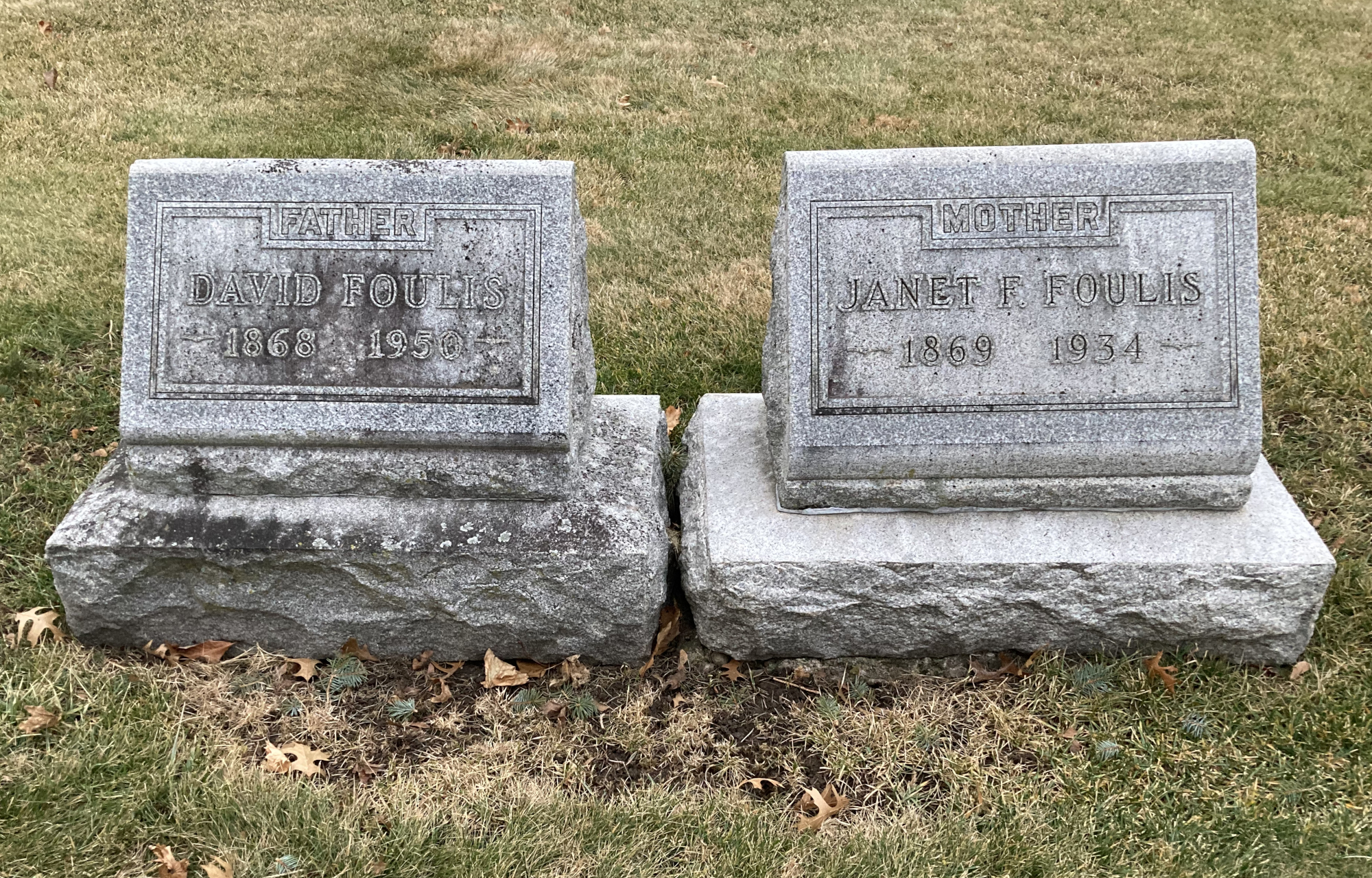
Foulis' grave at Wheaton Cemetery

Foulis had four brothers (John, James, Robert, and Simpson) who were all professional golfers. He also had two sisters, Annie and Maggie. His brother James won the 1896 U.S. Open.

== Death and legacy ==
Foulis died on 11 June 1950 at Hinsdale Hospital near Chicago, aged 82. He was buried in Wheaton Cemetery in Wheaton, Illinois. Foulis is remembered as the inventor of the golf flag support and the modern 7-iron, two significant inventions in the history of golf.
