= Foulis (disambiguation) =

Foulis is a castle.

Foulis may also refer to:

- G. T. Foulis, part of Haynes Publishing Group
- Foulis baronets, three separate baronetcies in the Baronetage of England and on the Baronetage of Nova Scotia

== People with the surname ==
- David Foulis (disambiguation)
- Henry Foulis (1638–1669), English academic theologian and author
- Robert Foulis (disambiguation)
- Thomas Foulis (fl. 1580–1628), Scottish goldsmith and financier
