= Andrew Smith (golfer) =

Canadian amateur golfer

- Smith in 1899

Personal information
- Full name: Andrew Whyte Smith
- Nationality: Canada
- Born: 6 February 1849 St Andrews, Scotland
- Died: 18 July 1901 (aged 52) Toronto, Canada

Career
- Sport: Golf
- Status: Amateur

Best results in major championships
- Masters Tournament: DNP
- PGA Championship: DNP
- U.S. Open: T3: 1895, 1896
- The Open Championship: T27: 1879

Andrew Whyte Smith (6 February 1849 – 18 July 1901) was a Canadian amateur golfer. He finished tied for third place in the 1895 U.S. Open played at Newport Golf Club in Rhode Island and had an identical result in the 1896 U.S. Open, held July 18, 1896, at Shinnecock Hills Golf Club in Southampton, New York.

== Early life ==
Smith was born and educated in St Andrews, Scotland. He came into his own as a golfer in his early 20s, playing with contemporaries such as Young Tom Morris and Davie Strath in St Andrews Rose Golf Club competitions.

== Golf career ==
In 1873, Smith moved to Glasgow, winning the Spring Meeting and Scratch Medal of the Glasgow Golf Club where he acted as Assistant Secretary.

Smith returned to his hometown of St Andrews to play in The Open Championship in 1879. He tied for 27th with a score of 190 and was leading amateur.

In 1880, before leaving Glasgow Golf Club, Smith was the first winner of the Tennant Cup, believed to be the second oldest amateur stroke-play competition in the world.

Smith emigrated to Canada in 1881, in order to work at the Quebec Bank and immediately joined the Royal Quebec Golf Club. In 1882, he relocated to Toronto where he joined the Toronto Golf Club. According to golf historian James Barclay, he assumed the status as the premiere golfer in Ontario.

The 1895 U.S. Open was the first U.S. Open, held on Friday, October 4, at Newport Golf Club in Newport, Rhode Island. Horace Rawlins won the tournament, two strokes ahead of runner-up Willie Dunn. Canadian amateur Andrew Smith, who carded rounds of 90–86=176, finished tied for third place.

The following year, at the 1896 U.S. Open, Smith, the Canadian amateur player, scored well on the Shinnecock Hills Golf Club course. His rounds of 78–80=158 put him in a tie for third place. He did not win any prize money due to his amateur status.

During a return home to Scotland in 1897, Smith, aged 49, entered the Open Championship at Hoylake. He tied for 49th place with a total of 365.

== Death and legacy ==
Smith died in Toronto on 18 July 1901 and is buried in Strathroy, Middlesex, Ontario. He is remembered as a leading amateur player in North America and for having two top-3 finishes in the U.S. Open, in 1895 and again in 1896.

== Results in major championships ==
Tournament	1879	1895	1896	1897
U.S. Open		T3LA	T3LA	
The Open Championship	27			49

Top 10

LA = low amateur
"T" indicates a tie for a place
? = Unknown
