= 1895 U.S. Open (golf) =

Tournament information
- Dates: October 4, 1895
- Location: Newport, Rhode Island; 41.462°N 71.347°W
- Course: Newport Golf Club
- Organized by: USGA
- Format: Stroke play − 36 holes

Statistics
- Length: 5,510 yards (5,038 m)
- Field: 11: 10 pros, 1 amateur
- Cut: none
- Prize fund: $335
- Winner's share: $150

Champion
- (England) Horace Rawlins
- 173
- Location in the United States Location in Rhode Island

The 1895 U.S. Open was the first U.S. Open, held on Friday, October 4, at Newport Golf Club in Newport, Rhode Island. Horace Rawlins won the inaugural event, two strokes ahead of runner-up Willie Dunn.

Eleven players began the tournament (three withdrew before play began), completing four loops around Newport's nine holes, which measured 2,755 yards (2,519 m). At the end of the first 18-holes Willie Campbell, Willie Dunn, and James Foulis were tied for the lead with 89, with Horace Rawlins two back at 91. Rawlins shot 41 on each of the last two loops of the course to post an 82 and 173 total, two ahead of Dunn and three ahead of Foulis and Canadian Andrew Smith, the lone amateur in the field. Rawlins won a winner's share of $150 and a gold medal.

== Background ==
The event was held as part of the first championship meeting of the United States Golf Association (USGA). The U.S. Amateur championship was contested by match-play and was held from October 1st to the 3rd. The Open Championship was held the following day. The two championships were held on the same course for the next two years, at Shinnecock Hills Golf Club in 1896 and the Chicago Golf Club in 1897.

The USGA championships at Newport were originally scheduled for September, but were rearranged to avoid clashing with the America's Cup yacht races, held in early September.

== Course ==
The championship was played on the 9-hole course of the Newport Golf Club.

Hole	Name	Yards
1	Plateau	240
2	Reef	385
3	Cop	165
4	Rock	190
5	Orchard	340
6	Quarry	485
7	Harbor	300
8	Meadow	360
9	Home	290
Total		2,755

== Field ==
Four amateurs entered the event: Charles Blair Macdonald, Winthrop Rutherfurd, Andrew Smith and L. B. Stoddard. However Macdonald, Rutherford and Stoddard withdrew before the event started, leaving only the Canadian amateur Andrew Smith in the event. Ten professionals entered, Newport being the only club with two entries. It was also reported that George Strath had tried to enter. Strath had only arrived in the United States on September 28.

== Final leaderboard ==
Friday, October 4, 1895

Place	Player	Score	Money ($)
1	(England) Horace Rawlins	91-82=173	150
2	(Scotland) Willie Dunn	89-86=175	100
T3	(Scotland) James Foulis	89-87=176	50
T3	(Canada) Andrew Smith (a)	90-86=176	0
5	(Scotland) William Davis	94-84=178	25
6	(Scotland) Willie Campbell	89-90=179	10
T7	(England) John Harland	93-90=183	0
T7	(Scotland) John Patrick	94-89=183	0
9	(England) Samuel Tucker	97-88=185	0
10	(Scotland) John Reid	100-106=206	0
WD	(Scotland) Willie Norton	109	0

(a) denotes amateur

=== Scorecard ===
Hole	Round	1	2	3	4	5	6	7	8	9	Score
(England) Rawlins	1	4	5	4	4	6	5	7	5	5	45
(England) Rawlins	2	6	5	3	4	5	7	5	6	5	46
(England) Rawlins	3	3	5	4	4	6	7	4	3	5	41
(England) Rawlins	4	3	5	4	3	5	6	5	5	5	41
(England) Rawlins	Total										173
(Scotland) Dunn	1	3	5	5	4	6	5	5	5	5	43
(Scotland) Dunn	2	5	4	7	4	5	6	5	5	5	46
(Scotland) Dunn	3	5	5	4	4	6	7	4	5	4	44
(Scotland) Dunn	4	4	5	4	4	5	6	4	5	5	42
(Scotland) Dunn	Total										175
