= Pau Golf Club =

Private golf club in Pau, France

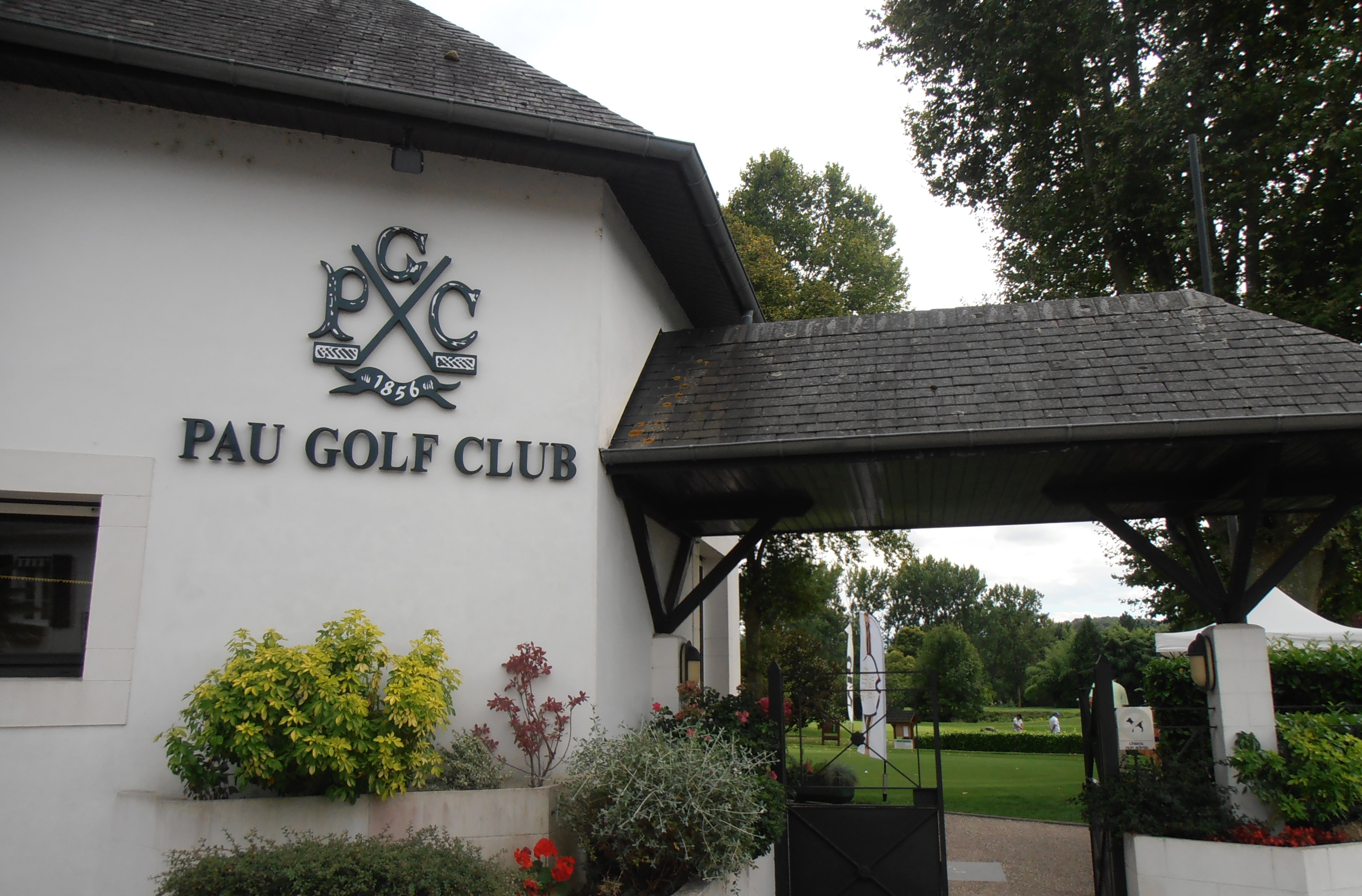
- Interactive map of Pau Golf Club
- 43.2962°N 0.3929°W

Club information
- Location: Rue du Golf, 64140 Billère, Pau, Pyrénées-Atlantiques, France.
- Established: 1856, 170 years ago
- Type: Private
- Designed by: Willie Dunn (golfer)
- Par: 72

The Pau Golf Club is one of the oldest golf clubs in the world. It is a private members-only club based in Pau, France.

Founded by a group of Lord Hamilton, the colonels William Neilson Hutchinson and Lloyd-Anstruther, the major Pontifex, the archdeacon John Sapte and John Stewart. while the course was designed by Willie Dunn (golfer) and opened for play in 1856. The Pau Golf Club is the oldest club in continental Europe. It is also the third Golf Club built in the world outside of Great Britain, after those of Charleston (United States, 1786) Kolkata (India, 1829) and Mumbai (India, 1842).

Located in the heart of the city of Pau, the Pau Golf Club, with its 18-hole flat and technical course, is considered one of the most beautiful golf courses in France.

== History ==
In the 17th century, during the reign of King Henry IV of France, bearnese people are known to have practiced the Jeu de mail on this site. The Billère plain at the gates of Pau, on the banks of the Gave de Pau, with the Pyrenees in the background, offered an idyllic setting.

Moreover, this old bed of the Gave, with its very permeable rocky subsoil, allowed to avoid the affliction of mud, even in winter. An agreement was quickly negotiated with the local bearnese people to make the site available.

Twenty years later, the same Scotsmen, wishing to rediscover their youthful memories, returned as tourists accompanied by a few friends, and always with their equipment.

Little by little, a whole English colony came to settle in Pau, profoundly impacting life in Pau during the Belle Époque, importing its customs, and its traditional sports, including horse riding (construction of the Pont-Long racecourse in 1842), hunting, Pyreneism, and of course golf.

After the publication of Dr. Alexander Taylor's book "On the curative influence of the climate of Pau and the mineral waters of the Pyrenees on diseases", the region of Pau became a popular destination for the British aristocracy. Among them, members of Scottish and English golf clubs staying in Bearn. In 1856, Lord Hamilton, Colonels Hutchinson and Lloyd-Anstruther, Major Pontifex, Archdeacon Sapte and John Stewart rented farmland on the banks of the Gave de Pau and founded the Pau Golf Club.

The Pau Golf Club hired the first professional golfer in France, Joe Lloyd, in 1883.

The PGC remained the only golf club in France for more than 30 years, until the opening of the Biarritz Golf Club (Golf du Phare) in 1888. The Argelès-Gazost golf course was founded in 1890, but no longer exists today.

The Pau Golf Club was organized within the framework of Freemasonry, the founding members, winterers from Scotland and England during the Belle Époque, were often Freemasons.

The club was initially run by a committee of nine to twelve members, the number of which varied from year to year, and the first two of which were renewable annually. Elected for a period of one year and eligible for re-election only after one year, the head of the committee was called the "Captain". It is only from 1909 onwards that the president will be able to (re)present himself every year.

Founded by citizens of Her Majesty staying in Pau, the Pau Golf Club was then a club resolutely turned towards the British colony. Thus, the "Captains" elected since 1878 are traditionally British and the club remains fundamentally British until the Second World War. However, between 1907 and 1908, for a brief period, the Captain was French, in the person of Baron de Longueil.

Initially, the British forbade the course to the local French people and to women.

At the end of World War I, many British tourists stopped visiting the city, and the golf course was saved by enthusiasts.

The end of the World War II marked the departure of the British colony. The number of members hardly exceeds 120 at the end of the occupation period.

Under the presidency of Maurice Liets, the 80's marked the discovery of golf by the French, and Pau did not escape this phenomenon.

The Pau Golf Club had more than five hundred members at the end of the 80s.

The club celebrated its 150th anniversary in 2005 in the presence of Jean Van de Velde, José María Olazábal, Severiano Ballesteros, while Colin Montgomerie ultimately could not join.

== Facilities and grounds ==
The Club-house serves as a museum dedicated to the rich history of this club and the sport in Bearn.

The first course, designed by Willie Dunn, a professional player from Royal Blackheath, consisted of 9 holes, extended to 12 holes in 1860, then to 18 holes in 1875. In 1877, a 9-hole course was added for Ladies who did not have access to the men's course.

The course is today a par 69 installed along the gave de Pau. The course is flat with small greens.

== Membership ==
The Pau Golf Club is a private club, open to its 650 members, their guests and visiting players.

=== Notable members ===
- Joe Lloyd
