= George Douglas =

George Douglas may refer to:

- George Douglas, 1st Earl of Angus (1380–1403), Scottish magnate
- George Douglas, 4th Earl of Angus (c. 1417–1463), Scottish magnate
- George Douglas, Master of Angus (1469–1513), Scottish nobleman
- George Douglas of Pittendreich (died 1552), Master of Angus, Scottish nobleman
- George Douglas of Helenhill, supporter of Mary, Queen of Scots
- George Douglas of Longniddry (fl. 1580–1610), Scottish landowner and courtier
- George Douglas of Parkhead (died 1602), Scottish landowner and mining entrepreneur
- George Douglas (bishop) (died 1589), Scottish prelate, Bishop of Moray
- George Douglas (diplomat) (died 1636), English ambassador to Poland 1634–1636
- George Douglas (Royal Navy officer), first captain of HMS Ardent (1764)
- George Douglas (footballer) (1893–1979), English association footballer
- George Douglas, 16th Earl of Morton (1761–1827), Scottish aristocrat
- George Douglas, 1st Earl of Dumbarton (1635–1692), Scottish nobleman and soldier
- George Douglas, 2nd Earl of Dumbarton (1687–1749), Scottish nobleman and soldier
- George Douglas, 4th Lord Mordington (died 1741)
- George Douglas, 13th Earl of Morton (1662–1738), British peer and politician
- George Douglas, 17th Earl of Morton (1789–1858), Scottish Tory politician
- George Douglas (priest) (1889–1973), Dean of Argyll and The Isles
- George Douglas-Hamilton, 10th Earl of Selkirk (1906–1994), Scottish aristocrat and First Lord of the Admiralty
- George Brisbane Scott Douglas (1856–1935), Scottish poet and writer
- George Douglas, the pen name of songwriter Bob Thiele (1922–1996)
- George Douglas (rugby), rugby union and rugby league player
- Sir George Douglas, 2nd Baronet (1754–1821), MP for Roxburghshire, 1784–1806
- George Henry Scott-Douglas (1825–1885), MP for Roxburghshire, 1874–1880
- Sir George Brisbane Douglas, 5th Baronet (1856–1935), of the Douglas baronets
- George Douglas (actor) (1903–1983), American actor
- George Douglas (golfer), Scottish golfer
- George Douglas (martyr) (1540–1587), one of the Eighty-five martyrs of England and Wales
- George Douglas, pen name of Lady Gertrude Stock (1842–1893), English writer and aristocrat
- George C. M. Douglas (1826–1904), moderator of the General Assembly of the Free Church of Scotland, 1894–95
- George W. Douglas, American economist

== See also ==
- George Douglas Brown (1869–1902), Scottish Victorian novelist
