= Jim Tyng =

American baseball player (1856–1931)

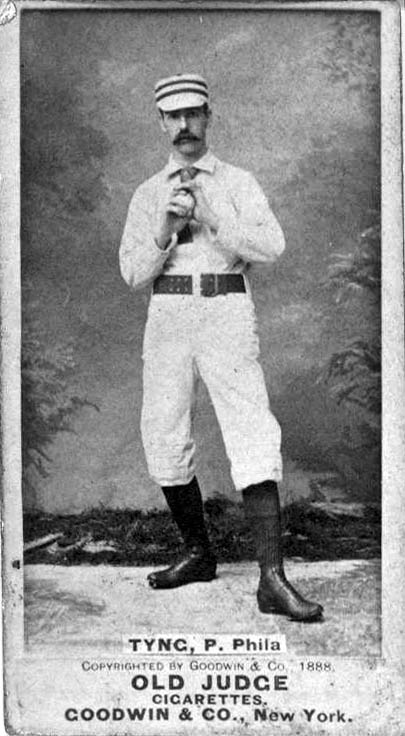
- Pitcher
- Born: May 27, 1856; Philadelphia
- Died: October 30, 1931 (aged 75); New York City
- Batted: Right Threw: Right

MLB debut
- September 23, 1879, for the Boston Red Caps

Last MLB appearance
- June 13, 1888, for the Philadelphia Phillies

MLB statistics
- Win–loss record: 1-2
- Earned run average: 4.94
- Batting average: .333
- Stats at Baseball Reference

Teams
- Boston Red Caps (1879); Philadelphia Phillies (1888)

James Alexander Tyng (May 27, 1856 – October 30, 1931) is known as the first baseball player to wear a catcher's mask while playing for Harvard College in 1877. The team manager, Fred Thayer, received a patent for the mask in 1878.

== Early life ==
Tyng was born in Philadelphia, Pennsylvania, on May 27, 1856.

== Baseball career ==
In 1879, Tyng became the first Harvard player selected to play in the majors, when he was picked up by Harry Wright and the Boston Red Caps as an emergency pitcher. Tyng defeated the first-place Providence Grays to draw the Red Caps within two games of the Grays. It was the only victory in his major league career. Tyng continued to pitch as an amateur for the Staten Island Athletic Club and repeatedly turned down offers to play in the major leagues. Later, in 1888, he pitched in one game for the Philadelphia Phillies.

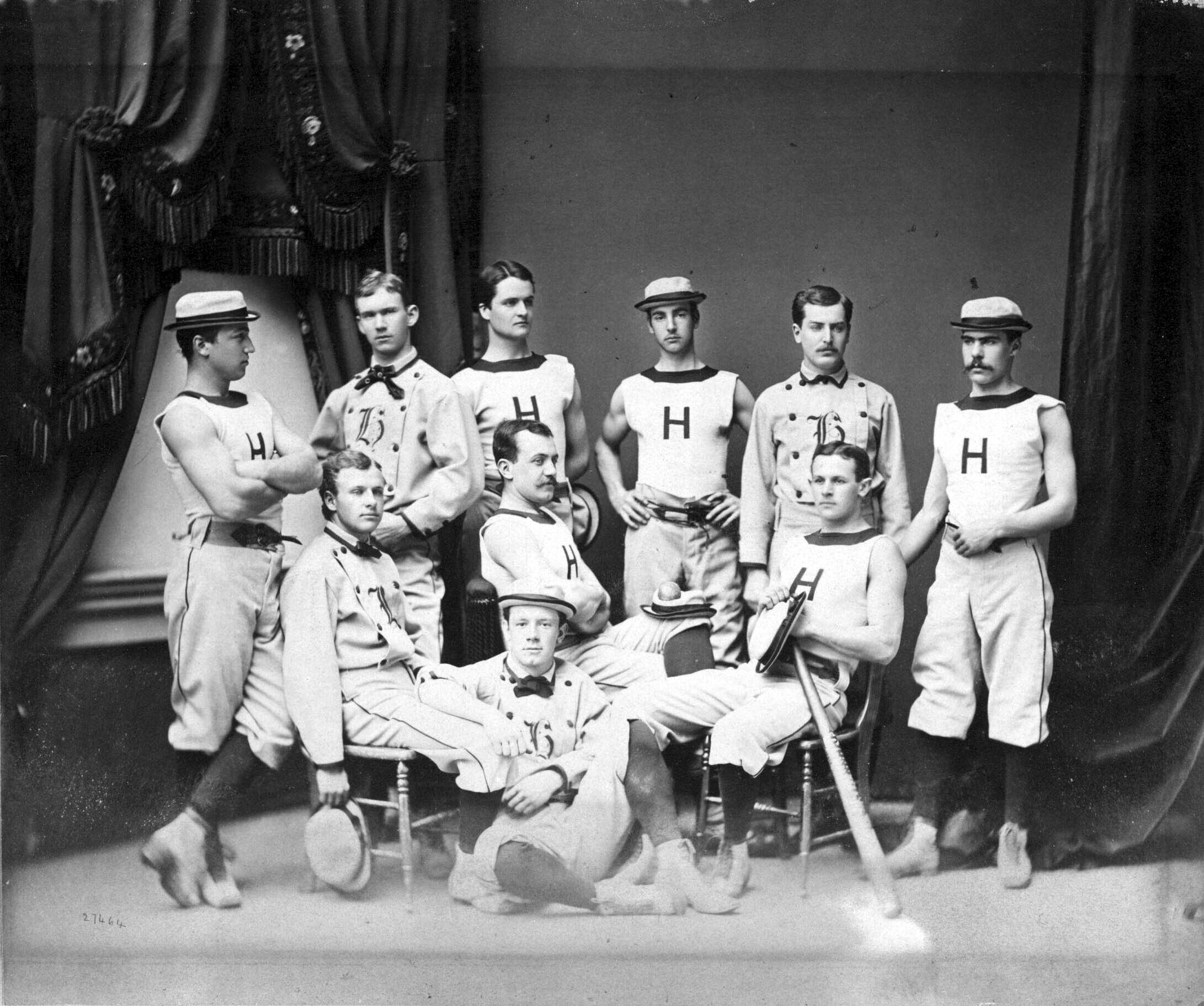
Tyng, back row second from right, with his Harvard teammates in 1877. Golf course architect Herbert Leeds stands back row far left.

== Amateur golf career ==
Tyng was also an accomplished amateur golfer. He played in the 1897 U.S. Open held at the Chicago Golf Club in Wheaton, Illinois. He shot rounds of 86-91=177 finishing near the middle of the field. He managed to beat several professionals, chief among them Bert Way and Robert White.
