= William Davis (golfer) =

Scottish professional golfer

William "Willie" Davis
Personal information
- Full name: William Frederick Davis
- Born: 1861 Scotland
- Died: 8 January 1902 (aged 40–41) Rye, New York, US
- Spouse: Mary McKinnon
- Children: 3

Career
- Sport: Golf
- Turned professional: 1885

Best results in major championships
- Masters Tournament: DNP
- PGA Championship: DNP
- U.S. Open: 5th: 1895
- The Open Championship: DNP

William Frederick Davis (1861–1902) was a Scottish professional golfer who designed two of the five charter clubs of the United States Golf Association (USGA), Shinnecock Hills Golf Club and Newport Country Club. At the time of his death in 1902, Davis was credited as being the first individual to have come to America to make a professional living as a golfer. He was also remembered as leading the movement to establish a championship tournament for professionals.

== Career ==
According to a 1900 U.S. census, Davis was born in Scotland in February 1861. He honed his golf skills under Jack Morris at the Royal Liverpool Golf Club in Hoylake, England. Once his application for employment at the Royal Montreal Golf Club in Canada was accepted, Davis booked passage to North America arriving in April 1881. His position as greenskeeper there did not suit him, so from Canada, Davis emigrated to the United States in 1885.

By July 1891, Davis was in Southampton, New York where he planned the original 12-hole short course at Shinnecock Hills Golf Club in just about a month.

The success of Shinnecock established Davis' reputation as a golf course designer. It opened the door for him to make his way to Rhode Island where he laid out the course at Newport Country Club in 1894. One writer applauded Davis' work at Newport and proclaimed "what was last year but an unexplored swamp is now one of the finest golf links in this country." That same year, Davis laid out a golf course for the Point Judith Country Club in Narragansett. Davis spent several years at Newport and had a brief stint as the winter professional for the Washington Golf Club where he was hired for the winter season in December 1898. After a disagreement at Newport, Davis was wooed away by The Apawamis Club, becoming one of its earliest resident pros.

Following an offer in the fall of 1899 to join the newly constructed Rye country club, Davis began almost immediately. One of his first projects was working with golf committee member Maturin Ballou to improve drainage for the links in November 1899. By July 1900, Davis had made some changes to the Apawamis course that Tom Bendelow had originally laid out. Davis shortened several of Bendelow's holes but also increased the ninth hole in length to 600 yards. The resulting total yardage was 6205. Names of the holes included Fairview, Waterloo and Consolation. At that time, Davis held a record score of 78 that even famed British golfer Harry Vardon could not best.

Among other firsts, William Davis is also cited as North America's first golf clubmaker.

== Tournaments ==
As a resident professional, Davis participated in many tournaments including those that took place on courses he had a hand in designing. He was regularly considered a top contender in any field along the likes of Willie Dunn, Willie Campbell and others. The first U.S. Open, held on Friday, October 4, 1895, was played on the Newport course Davis had designed and Davis placed fifth. Davis' assistant Horace Rawlins won the inaugural U.S. Open title, two strokes ahead of Dunn, the runner-up.

Davis' proudest accomplishment was defeating two-time Open Champion Willie Park, Jr. in 1895.

== Led movement for professional tournament ==
While at Apawamis, Davis worked with other club professionals like George Low to secure terms to hold an annual championship tournament whose field was to be solely composed of resident players associated with Eastern clubs. In 1901, a petition men at 44 clubs in the Metropolitan Golf Association (MGA) was signed and presented by Davis and fellow pro Willie Norton of Lakewood Golf Club and Deal Beach Club both in New Jersey. Davis and the pros had the support of Maturin Ballou representing Apawamis but they were turned down by the MGA in April of the same year. Their combined efforts would not bear fruit until 1906 after Davis' death. The result was the Eastern Professional Golfers Association. Low would be the organization's first president.

== Personal life and death ==
Davis and his wife Mary were married in Canada in 1883. They had three sons and were residents of Rye, New York when Davis died at age 40 on 8 January 1902, from pneumonia.

== Legacy ==
For some time, Davis was not given correct attribution for his design of the course at Shinnecock and credit was given to professional golfer Willie Dunn instead. Historians, the USGA and Shinnecock Club itself have corrected that error in recent years.
