= London Scottish Golf Club =

Golf club in London, England

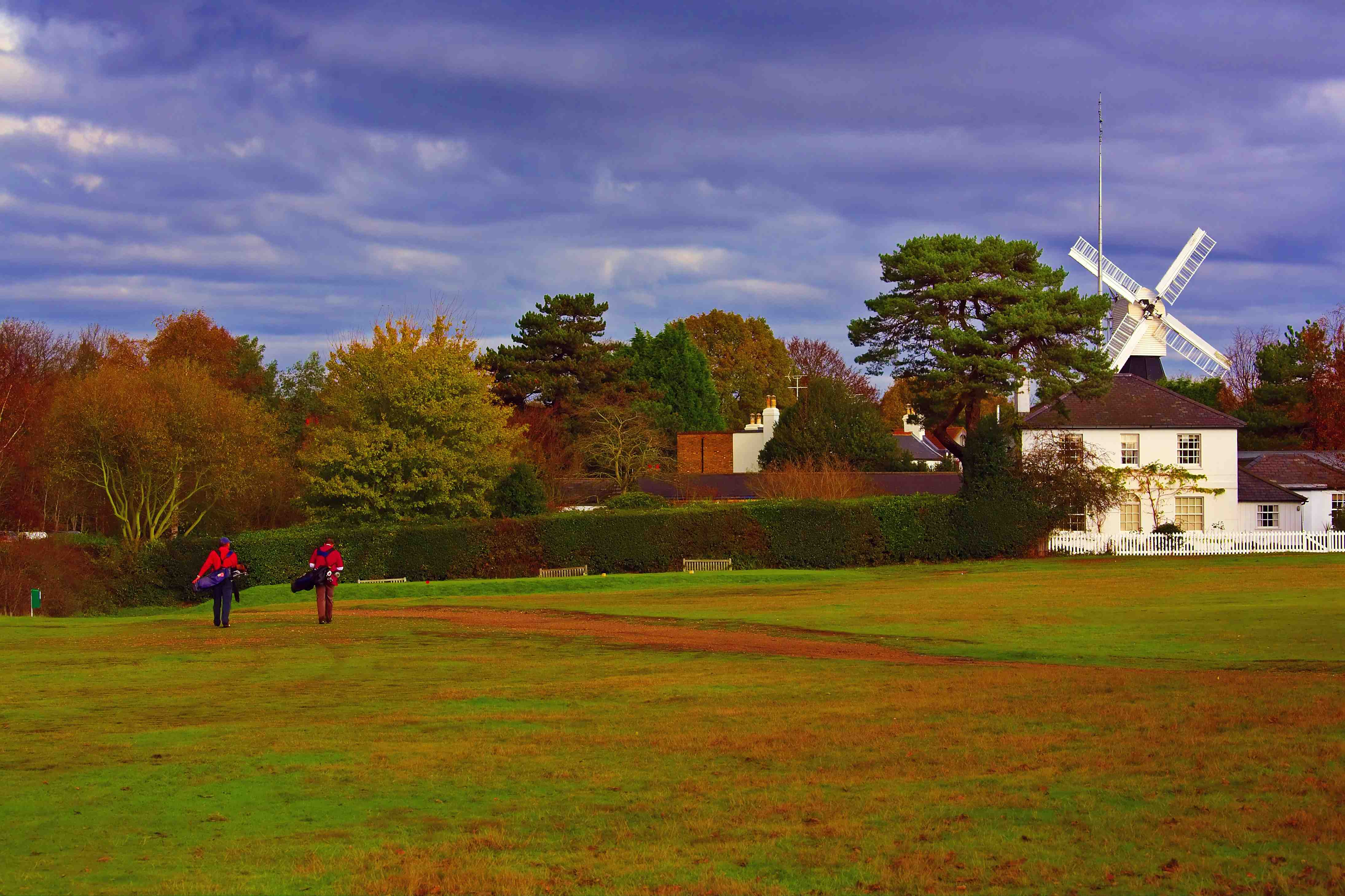
London Scottish Golf Club looking back to Wimbledon windmill

London Scottish Golf Club near the windmill on Wimbledon Common is the third oldest golf club in England.

It was founded in 1865 by members of the London Scottish Volunteer Rifles (later the London Scottish regiment), who were stationed on the common. Some of the holes were laid out roughly along the lines of rifle ranges. Golf was played on the course for at least three years before the club's formal foundation, which makes it the longest continually played-upon golf course in England.

Initially laid out by Willie Dunn Sr. and consisting of seven holes for much of its early existence, it was redesigned as an 18-hole course by the club's professional Tom Dunn, son of Willie Dunn Sr, in 1871 – thereby becoming only the fifth golf course in the world to have 18 holes and the first in England. The redesign of the course came in the same year that the Wimbledon and Putney Commons Act took the common away from the ownership of the 5th Earl Spencer and into public hands. The land over which it was laid out is heath and woodland.

The club was opened up to women in 1872. The London Scottish course hosted the first ever Oxford v Cambridge University golf match in 1878, and the annual fixture was played there for almost two decades until 1896, after which it moved to Royal St Georges in Sandwich.

In 1881 a split within the club between military and civilian members, including Laidlaw Purves, led to the creation by the civilians of what is now Royal Wimbledon Golf Club. The two clubs shared the course on the common in largely amicable circumstances until 1908, when Royal Wimbledon opened its own new course just off the common. However, its members continued to play on the common, as well as the new course, until 1915.

In 1908 Wimbledon Common Golf Club was founded, and also began to share the old course on the common with London Scottish – meaning that between 1908 and 1915 there were three clubs playing on the 18 holes of the common. Once Royal Wimbledon fully departed in 1915, London Scottish and Wimbledon Common GC shared the course, and that arrangement has continued to the present day. Although the clubs are entirely separate, with their own clubhouses and different starting points, they work together and jointly employ the course green-keeping staff.

Notable members of London Scottish Golf Club have included Arthur Balfour, British prime minister from 1902 to 1905, and Willie Dunn Jr, the first unofficial champion of America in 1894 and runner-up in the first US Open of 1895. George Duncan, Open Champion at Deal in 1920 and victorious captain of the 1929 British Ryder Cup team, was also a member. In 2015, the club's 150th anniversary year, Colin Montgomerie was captain.

The club has had a strong tradition of professionals who have been renowned golf club makers, including John Butchart, Hugh Logan, David Wilson, Spen Attwood and, in the more modern era, Matthew Barr. The former European Tour pro Steve Barr, Matthew's brother, was professional at the club from 1992 to late 2021, and Matthew returned to the club on Steve's retirement.

Due to local byelaws, all golfers playing on the London Scottish course must wear a pillar box red upper garment. Because of its age and its positioning on a Site of Special Scientific Interest, the course is unusual in not having any sand traps – although it does have grass bunkers. Its wood-panelled clubhouse, which was built in 1897 and is a listed building, is a rare remaining example of a purpose-built Victorian golf pavilion.

The fictional Wombles of Wimbledon Common, created by the British children's author Elisabeth Beresford, often played golf on the London Scottish course. In The Wombles to the Rescue (first published in 1974) Tomsk, the most accomplished of the golfing Wombles, is reported to have once played the course in level par.
