= David Foulis =

David Foulis may refer to:

- Sir David Foulis, 1st Baronet (died 1642), Scottish politician
- Sir David Foulis, 3rd Baronet (1633–1695), MP for Northallerton (UK Parliament constituency)
- David Foulis (golfer) (1868–1950), born in Scotland
- David J. Foulis (1930–2018), American mathematician
