= Jim Foulis =

American golfer (1903–1969)

Personal information
- Full name: James Ronald Foulis
- Nationality: United States
- Born: October 6, 1903 Illinois, U.S.
- Died: April 12, 1969 (aged 65) Wickenburg, Arizona, U.S.

Career
- Sport: Golf
- Status: Professional
- Professional wins: 5

Number of wins by tour
- PGA Tour: 2
- Other: 3

Best results in major championships
- Masters Tournament: 11th: 1946
- PGA Championship: T5: 1938
- U.S. Open: T16: 1940
- The Open Championship: DNP

James R. Foulis (October 6, 1903 – April 12, 1969) was an American professional golfer.

== Early life ==
James Foulis was born in Illinois on October 6, 1903, the son of David Foulis, a golfer and inventor, and Janet Foulis (née Fowler). His uncle was James Foulis, winner of the 1896 U.S. Open.

== Professional career ==
Foulis won several tournaments, including four Illinois PGA Championships and the 1933 St. Paul Open, two of which are considered PGA Tour wins.

Foulis also played in the first Masters Tournament in 1934, carding rounds of 78-74-76-72=300.

== Personal life ==
Foulis died on April 12, 1969, in Wickenburg, Arizona.

His son David J. Foulis was a notable mathematician.

== Professional wins ==
=== PGA Tour wins (2) ===
- 1929 Illinois PGA Championship
- 1933 St. Paul Open

=== Other wins (3) ===
Note: This list may be incomplete

- 1933 Illinois PGA Championship
- 1943 Illinois PGA Championship
- 1946 Illinois PGA Championship

== Results in major championships ==
Tournament	1927	1928	1929
U.S. Open	T31		T38
PGA Championship		R32	

Tournament	1930	1931	1932	1933	1934	1935	1936	1937	1938	1939
Masters Tournament	NYF	NYF	NYF	NYF	T28	T37				T37
U.S. Open	46				T35	T32		CUT	T19	T25
PGA Championship		R16			R32	R64		R16	QF	R64

Tournament	1940	1941	1942	1943	1944	1945	1946	1947	1948	1949
Masters Tournament	T29	T29	T26	NT	NT	NT	11	52		
U.S. Open	T16	T42	NT	NT	NT	NT				CUT
PGA Championship	R16	R32								

Note: Foulis never played in The Open Championship

Top 10
Did not play

NYF = tournament not yet founded
NT = no tournament
CUT = missed the half-way cut
R64, R32, R16, QF, SF = round in which player lost in PGA Championship match play
"T" indicates a tie for a place

=== Summary ===
Tournament	Wins	2nd	3rd	Top-5	Top-10	Top-25	Events	Cuts made
Masters Tournament	0	0	0	0	0	1	8	8
U.S. Open	0	0	0	0	0	3	11	9
The Open Championship	0	0	0	0	0	0	0	0
PGA Championship	0	0	0	1	4	7	9	9
Totals	0	0	0	1	4	11	28	26

- Most consecutive cuts made – 14 (1938 U.S. Open – 1947 Masters)
- Longest streak of top-10s – 1 (four times)
