= Robert Whigham =

British Army general

General Sir Robert Whigham GCB KCMG DSO
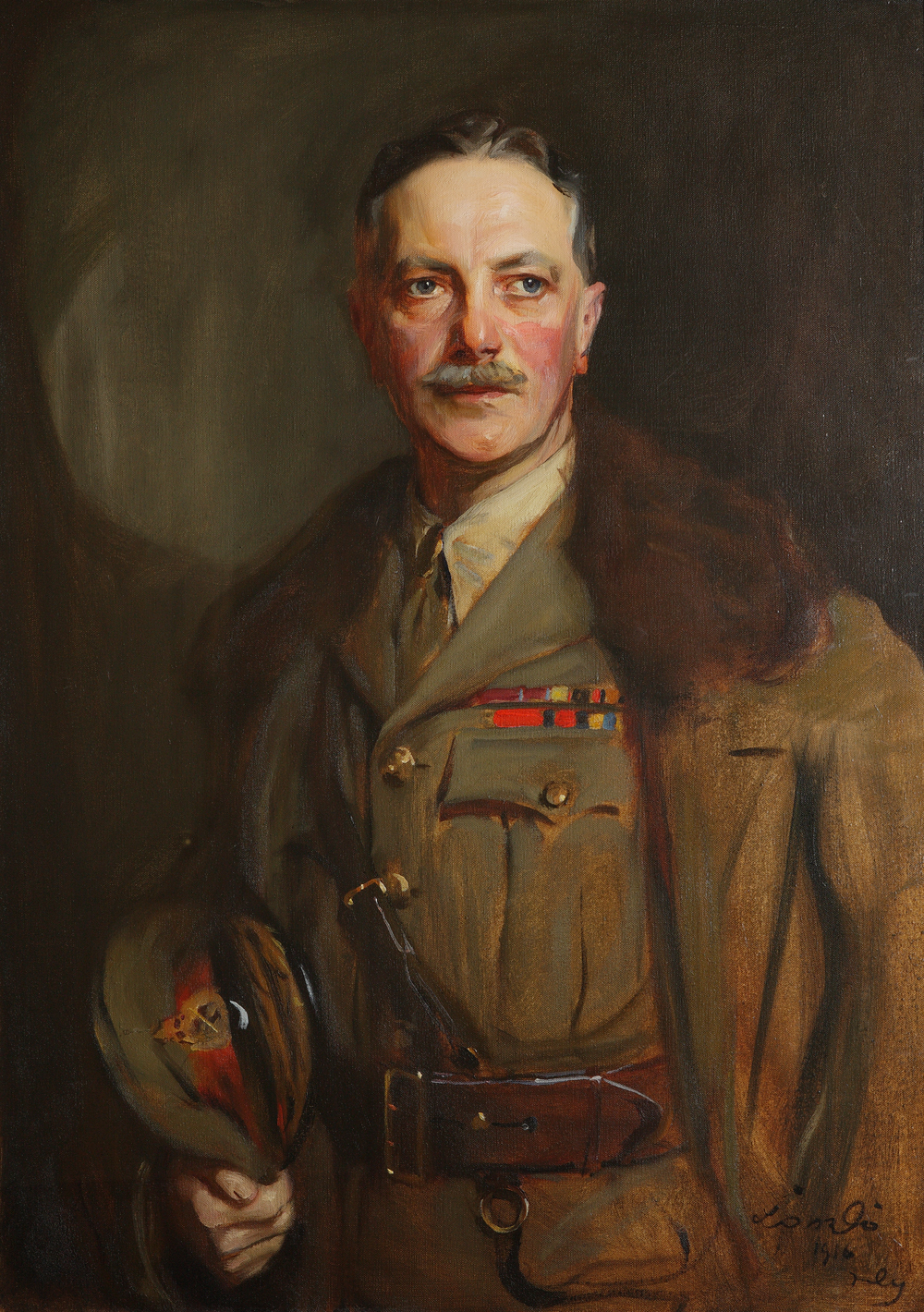
- Portrait by Philip Alexius de László
- Born: 5 August 1865; Ayr, Ayrshire, Scotland
- Died: 23 June 1950 (aged 84); Fife, Scotland
- Military career
- Allegiance: United Kingdom
- Branch: British Army
- Service years: 1883–1931
- Rank: General
- Commands: Eastern Command; 3rd Division; Light Division British Army of the Rhine; 62nd (2nd West Riding) Division; 59th (2nd North Midland) Division
- Conflicts: Mahdist War; Battle of Atbara; Second Boer War; Battle of Paardeberg; Battle of Poplar Grove; Battle of Driefontein; Battle of Witpoort; First World War
- Awards: Knight Grand Cross of the Order of the Bath; Knight Commander of the Order of St Michael and St George; Distinguished Service Order; Mentioned in Despatches (4); Legion of Honour (France)

General Sir Robert Dundas Whigham, GCB, KCMG, DSO (5 August 1865 – 23 June 1950) was a Scottish British Army officer who served as Adjutant-General to the Forces.

== Early life ==
Whigham was born on 5 August 1865, the son of David Dundas Whigham and Ellen Murray (née Campbell). His father was a lawyer and a cricket player. His sister was Sybil Whigham who was a successful golfer; another brother was the golfer and journalist H. J. Whigham. Their sister Molly Whigham also played golf.

== Military career ==
Educated at Fettes College in Edinburgh and at the Royal Military College, Sandhurst, Whigham was commissioned into the 1st Battalion of the Royal Warwickshire Regiment as a lieutenant on 9 May 1885, where the future field marshal, William Birdwood, was a fellow student.

In January 1892 he was appointed an adjutant and was promoted to captain in March. He was seconded for service with to the Egyptian Army in December 1897, where he served in the Nile Expedition of 1898 with the 12th Sudanese Battalion.

During the Second Boer War he served from 1899 as aide-de-camp to Major-General Hector MacDonald, in command of the Highland Brigade, and was promoted to major on augmentation in August 1900. He was later at army headquarters in South Africa, and for his service was awarded the Distinguished Service Order (DSO) in the South Africa Honours list published on 26 June 1902.

Following the end of the war, he returned to the United Kingdom in August 1902, and then became brigade major for the 10th Brigade, 5th Division, then part of the 2nd Army Corps, on 1 November 1902. He was then made a deputy assistant adjutant general at the War Office in October 1906 and was promoted to lieutenant colonel in February 1908. After relinquishing his assignment as a deputy assistant adjutant general at the War Office, he then succeeded Colonel Edward Perceval as a general staff officer, grade 2 at the Staff College, Camberley.

He was promoted to colonel in October 1911 and in April 1912 became a GSO1 at the War Office.

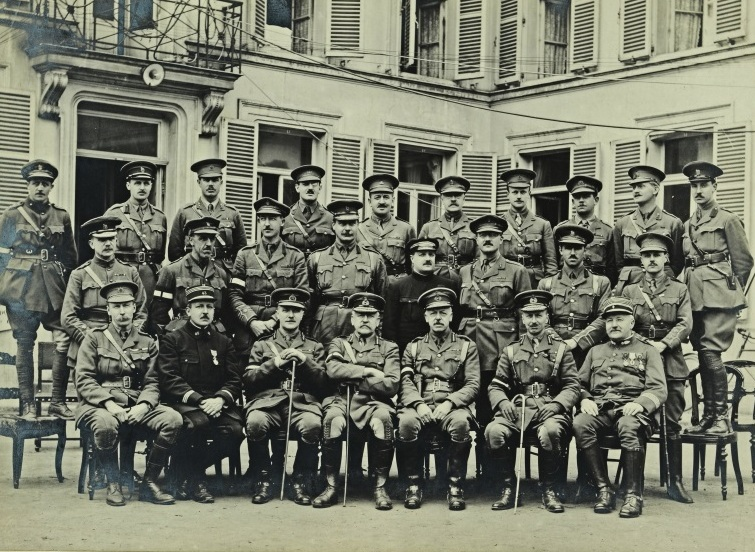
Lieutenant General Charles Monro (front row, centre, arms folded), GOC I Corps, and members of his corps staff in France, c. 1915. To Monro's right is his BGGS, Brigadier General Robert Whigham.

Whigham served in the First World War, initially with the British Expeditionary Force on the Western Front. In September he took over the position of the 2nd Division's GSO1 from Colonel The Hon. Frederick Gordon. On 27 December he was promoted to temporary rank of brigadier general and became brigadier general, general staff of I Corps. which he relinquished in July 1915 when he took up the position of sub-chief of the general staff at the general headquarters of the BEF from Major General Edward Perceval, and for which he remained a temporary brigadier while also being a substantive colonel. Promoted to temporary major general in September, he was appointed deputy chief of the imperial general staff (DCIGS) at the War Office in December 1915, taking over from Launcelot Kiggell. Promoted to the substantive rank of major general in January 1916 "for distinguished service in the Field", he became general officer commanding (GOC) 59th (2nd North Midland) Division in June 1918 and GOC 62nd (2nd West Riding) Division in August.

After the war Whigham became GOC of the Light Division in the British Army of the Rhine. He was appointed GOC 3rd Division in 1919, promoted to lieutenant general in August 1921 was Adjutant-General to the Forces in 1923, and was appointed colonel of the Royal Warwickshire Regiment, in succession to Lieutenant General Sir Launcelot Kiggell, in June 1925. He then served as GOC-in-Chief for Eastern Command in March 1927. He was promoted to general in January 1928.

He was appointed aide-de-camp general to King George V in August 1930, in succession to General Sir John Asser, and relinquished Eastern Command in March 1931, the same month he retired from the army.

== Family ==
In 1899 Whigham married Isabel Adeline Muntz.

Military offices
Preceded by Sir Launcelot Kiggell	Deputy Chief of the Imperial General Staff; 1915–1918	Succeeded by Sir Charles Harington
Preceded by Cecil Romer	GOC 59th (2nd North Midland) Division; June–1918	Succeeded by Nevill Smyth
Preceded by Walter Braithwaite	GOC 62nd (2nd West Riding) Division; 1918–1919	Post disbanded
Preceded by Cyril Deverell	GOC 3rd Division; 1919–1922	Succeeded by William Heneker
Preceded by Sir Philip Chetwode	Adjutant General; 1923–1927	Succeeded by Sir Walter Braithwaite
Preceded by Sir Walter Braithwaite	GOC-in-C Eastern Command; 1927–1931	Succeeded by Sir Webb Gillman
