= Alfred Ricketts =

English professional golfer (1870–unknown)

Personal information
- Full name: Alfred H. Ricketts
- Nationality: England; United States
- Born: February 1870 England
- Died: Unknown
- Spouse: Nettie Brooks

Career
- Sport: Golf
- Status: Professional

Best results in major championships
- Masters Tournament: DNP
- PGA Championship: DNP
- U.S. Open: T6: 1897
- The Open Championship: DNP

Alfred H. Ricketts (born February 1870) was an English professional golfer who played in the late 19th and early 20th century.

== Early life ==
In 1888, Ricketts emigrated from England to the United States and took a job as a golf instructor at the Country Club of Rochester in Rochester, New York, where he instructed Rochester-born Walter Hagen and others on the finer points of golf. In 1900 he married Nettie Brooks and born to them was a son, Albert G. Ricketts, circa 1902.

== Golf career ==
Ricketts tied for sixth place, with Bernard Nicholls, in the 1897 U.S. Open, held at Chicago Golf Club in Wheaton, Illinois. He got off to a poor start with an opening round 91 but with a full 10-shot improvement in round two at 81 he finished high on the leaderboard. He didn't win any prize money; only the top-5 finishers received a prize. Ricketts also had a tenth place finish in the 1896 U.S. Open by carding rounds of 80-83=163.

== Later life ==
By 1910, his wife had died and he was a widower. In 1930, likely as a result of the Great Depression, he was no longer in the golf business but rather was working as a packer and stamper in a metal fabrication factory.

== Death ==
Ricketts' date of death is unknown.

== Results in major championships ==
Tournament	1896	1897	1898	1899
U.S. Open	10	T6	?	16

Note: Ricketts played only in the U.S. Open.

"T" indicates a tie for a place
? = unknown
Yellow background for top-10
