= Fred Thayer =

American baseball manager (1854–1913)

- Thayer in a Harvard team photograph
- Born: Frederick Winthrop Thayer; August 14, 1854; Boston, Massachusetts, U.S.
- Died: September 17, 1913 (aged 59)
- Education: Harvard

Frederick Winthrop Thayer (August 14, 1854 – September 17th, 1913) was an American baseball manager known for inventing the catcher's mask.

== Early life ==
Thayer was born in Boston, Massachusetts on August 14, 1854.

== Harvard and the invention of the catcher's mask ==
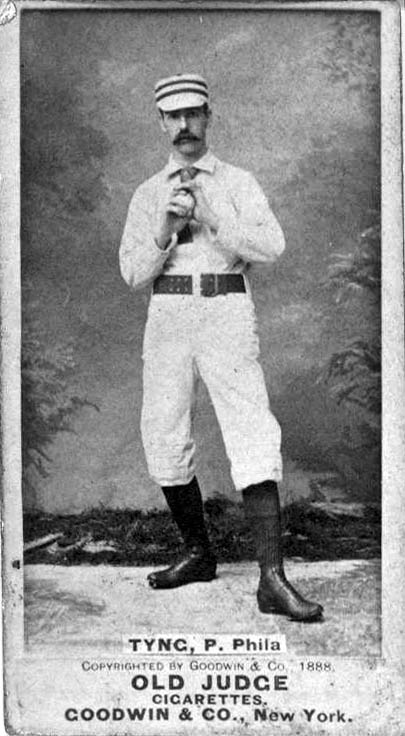
Jim Tyng, the first man to wear a catcher's mask during a professional game

Thayer entered Harvard College in 1875. During his tenure he played football and was manager and third-baseman of the Harvard baseball teams of 1876–1878. While managing the baseball team, Thayer's catcher, Jim Tyng, was frequently being hit in the head with the ball during games. To combat this, the two men discussed ways to help protect Tyng's face without impeding his visibility. In the winter of 1876, Thayer went to a local tinsmith to construct a "bird cage" like mask with padding to the chin and forehead. Practice sessions between Tyng and Thayer proved the mask successful and on April 12, 1877, the first professional baseball game was played with a catcher's mask.

On February 12, 1878, Thayer received a patent for the mask. The invention gained so much attention that the leading sporting goods dealer in America at the time, Spalding, began selling them for 3 dollars in their catalogue. In 1883, Thayer sued Spalding for patent infringement, and the company was ultimately forced to pay royalties.
