= Patti Frazer Lock =

American mathematician

Patricia Frazer Lock (born 1953) is an American mathematician, mathematics educator, statistician, statistics educator, and textbook author whose research interests include social networks and quantum logic. She is the Cummings Professor of Mathematics at St. Lawrence University.

== Education and career ==
Lock is the daughter of J. Ronald Frazer, a hockey player and business school professor at Clarkson University. She graduated from Colgate University in 1975, with a bachelor's degree in mathematics, and went on to graduate study at the University of Massachusetts Amherst where she earned a master's degree in 1978 and completed her Ph.D. in 1981. Her dissertation, Categories of Manuals, was supervised by David J. Foulis.

After working for a term as an instructor at the United States Naval Academy, she joined St. Lawrence University in 1981. She became full professor in 1994 and Cummings Professor in 2002.

She has served the Mathematical Association of America as chair of its Special Interest Group on Statistics Education for 2015–2016.

== Books ==
With Deborah Hughes Hallett, Andrew M. Gleason, and others, Lock is one of the co-authors of the Harvard Calculus Consortium series of textbooks. She is also a co-author with her husband and three children, all professional mathematicians and statisticians, of a statistics textbook, Statistics: Unlocking the Power of Data.

== Recognition ==
In 2016 the Seaway Section of the Mathematical Association of America gave Lock their Clarence Stephens Distinguished Teaching Award. In 2017 Lock won the Dexter C. Whittinghill III Award of the Mathematical Association of America Special Interest Group on Statistics Education for her work on incorporating visualizations of big data into introductory statistics courses.
