= David Whigham =

Scottish cricketer and advocate (1832–1906)

Personal information
- Full name: David Dundas Whigham
- Born: 22 August 1832; Edinburgh, Midlothian, Scotland
- Died: 27 October 1906 (aged 74); Prestwick, Ayrshire, Scotland
- Batting: Unknown

Domestic team information
- Years: Team
- 1856–1857: Marylebone Cricket Club

Career statistics
Competition	First-class
Matches	3
Runs scored	29
Batting average	4.83
100s/50s	–/–
Top score	9
Catches/stumpings	1/–
- Source: Cricinfo, 10 May 2021

David Dundas Whigham (22 August 1832 – 27 October 1906) was a Scottish first-class cricketer and legal advocate.

== Biography ==
The son of Robert Whigham of Lochpatrick, advocate and Sheriff of Perthshire, and his wife, Jane Dundas, daughter of Sir Robert Dundas, 1st Baronet, he was born at Edinburgh in August 1832.

He was educated at Winchester College, before going up to Oriel College, Oxford. Whigham did not play first-class cricket for Oxford University Cricket Club while studying at Oriel, but did play three first-class matches for the Marylebone Cricket Club from 1856 to 1857, scoring 29 runs with a highest score of 9. Following his graduation from Oxford, Whigham was admitted to the Faculty of Advocates to practise as an advocate in 1858. He later worked as a wine merchant.

Whigham was married to Ellen Murray (née Campbell), daughter of advocate James Campbell of Craigie House and Grace Elizabeth Hay. Through this marriage, he was the brother-in-law of Richard Campbell MP. The couple had six sons and four daughters, including the British Army General Sir Robert Whigham, the female golf player Sybil Whigham, and the golfer and journalist H. J. Whigham. Through their son George Hay Whigham, they were also the grandparents of the famous Margaret Whigham, Duchess of Argyll. Whigham died at his residence at Prestwick in October 1906.
