= Sybil Whigham =

Scottish golfer (1871–1954)

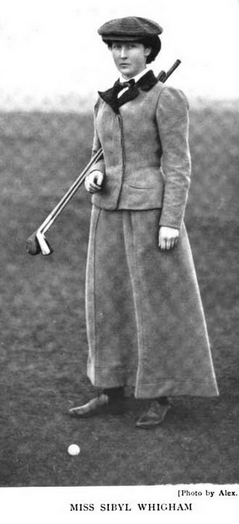
Sybil Whigham, from a 1907 publication.

Sybil Whigham, also seen as Sibyl Whigham and later as Sybil Nicholson (29 July 1871 – after March 1954), was a Scottish golfer.

== Early life ==
Sybil Harriet Whigham was born in Tarbolton, Scotland, the daughter of David Dundas Whigham and Ellen Murray (née Campbell). Her father was a lawyer and a cricket player. She spent part of her childhood in the home of an aunt in Edinburgh. One brother was Sir Robert Whigham; another brother was golfer and journalist H. J. Whigham. Their sister Molly Whigham also played golf. "The names of the Misses Whigham are renowned all over the world where golf is played," explained fellow player May Hezlet in 1907. "Miss Molly Whigham is perhaps the more brilliant player, but Miss Sibyl Whigham is the steadier, and the one who takes part in a greater number of meetings."

== Career ==
Sybil Whigham was an "accomplished player" by the turn into the twentieth century. Her home course was at Prestwick. She was credited as having the longest drive of any woman golfer in her day, surpassing 230 yards. In 1895 she played in the British Ladies Amateur at Royal Portrush Golf Club in Ireland. In 1900 she and her sister played in the British Ladies Amateur at the Royal North Devon Golf Club. In 1901 she defeated May Hezlet before losing to Rhona Adair at the British Ladies Amateur in Aberdovey, Wales. She was a semifinalist at the British Ladies Amateur at Deal in 1902, and played at the British Ladies Amateur at Troon in 1904. She returned to the links in 1919, for a competition at the Addington course in Croydon.

== Personal life ==
Sybil Whigham married Capt. W. H. Nicholson of the Royal Navy, in 1912. She was widowed when he died at Sidmouth in 1932. She lived in Woking for much of her adult life, appearing in electoral registers there from 1918 to 1945, and was a member of the Women's Voluntary Service during World War II. She was mentioned as Sybil Nicholson, one of the two surviving sisters of H. J. Whigham, in the latter's obituary in 1954.

Her niece and namesake Sybil Whigham Young was a socialite and equestrian in 1930s New York. Another socialite niece, Margaret Campbell, Duchess of Argyll, was at the center of a particularly salacious divorce scandal in 1963.
