= George Douglas (golfer) =

Scottish golfer

Personal information
- Full name: George Douglas
- Nationality: Scotland
- Born: c. 1869 Scotland

Career
- Sport: Golf
- Status: Professional

Best results in major championships
- Masters Tournament: DNP
- PGA Championship: DNP
- U.S. Open: T3: 1896
- The Open Championship: T25: 1892

George Douglas (born c. 1869) was a Scottish professional golfer. Douglas tied for third place in the 1896 U.S. Open, held 18 July 1896 at Shinnecock Hills Golf Club in Southampton, New York.

== Early life ==
Douglas was born in Scotland, circa 1869.

== Golf career ==
=== 1896 U.S. Open ===
Douglas tied for third place in the 1896 U.S. Open, held 18 July 1896 at Shinnecock Hills Golf Club in Southampton, New York. He posted two consistent rounds of 79-79=158 and took home $50 in prize money. The Canadian amateur Andrew Smith tied Douglas on 158 but as an amateur player he could not accept any prize money.

== Death ==
Douglas's date of death is unknown.
