= James Foulis =

Professional golfer (1871–1928)

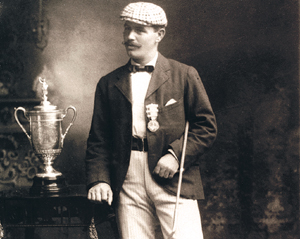
- Foulis in 1895 with the U.S. Open trophy

Personal information
- Nationality: Scotland
- Born: 22 August 1871 St Andrews, Scotland
- Died: 3 March 1928 (aged 56) Chicago, Illinois, U.S.

Career
- Sport: Golf
- Status: Professional
- Professional wins: 1

Best results in major championships (wins: 1)
- PGA Championship: DNP
- U.S. Open: Won: 1896
- The Open Championship: DNP

James Foulis (22 August 1871 – 3 March 1928), also known as James Foulis Jr., was a Scottish-born professional golfer who played extensively in the United States. He won the second U.S. Open which was held in 1896. He also finished tied for third in the inaugural 1895 U.S. Open.

== Early life ==
Foulis was born at the "Home of Golf", St Andrews in Scotland, on 22 August 1871. His father was foreman at Old Tom Morris's golf shop and clubmaking business, and Foulis spent some time working at the shop.

Foulis had four brothers, all of whom also moved to the United States. Robert and David Foulis were also golf professionals, Simpson Foulis was a fine amateur golfer while John was an expert ballmaker who also worked as a bookkeeper at Chicago Golf Club from 1901 to his untimely death in 1907.

== Professional career ==
In 1895, he traveled to the United States to take up a job as a golf professional at Chicago Golf Club, which was the first club in the United States to have an 18-hole course. He was the first golf professional in the western States.

Foulis was one of the eleven players who took part in the first 1895 U.S. Open, and he came third. The following year he won the tournament at Shinnecock Hills Golf Club on Long Island. He was representing the Chicago Golf Club and he won $200. He was helped out by the fact that twice British Open champion Willie Park, Jr., who would have been odds-on favorite if he had reached the United States in time to play, did not arrive in America until the day after the tournament. The following year the Open was played at Foulis's home club, and he finished tied for third with Willie Dunn, Jr. The most notable aspect of his game was his driving; it is said that he often drove over three hundred yards using the relatively primitive clubs of his day. He continued to compete in the U.S. Open until 1911, but did not win again.

=== Golf inventions ===
Jim Foulis and his brother David ran a golf shop at the Chicago Golf Club, and played a significant part in the evolution of golf equipment. They invented the bramble patterning for Coburn Haskell's new rubber-cored ball. In response to the demands of the new ball they developed the "mashie-niblick", the modern 7-iron, which fell between the traditional mashie (5-iron) and niblick (9-iron), and patented the design. Jim Foulis also worked as a golf course designer from 1896 until his death, designing the first golf courses in many communities across the American midwest.

== Personal life ==
Foulis was married to Jane 'Jeanie' Foulis (née Cutt) .

His nephew, Jim Foulis, son of brother David, was also a professional golfer and won the 1933 St. Paul Open.

== Death and legacy ==
Foulis died on 3 March 1928. Foulis and his five brothers are buried in Wheaton Cemetery, adjacent to Chicago Golf Club.

He is remembered as the winner of the 1896 U.S. Open. He finished third in the 1895 U.S. Open and was an inventor of golf equipment. He was the original designer of the Country Club golf course in Denver, Colorado, included in Country Club Historic District, listed on the U.S. National Register of Historic Places.

== Major championships ==
=== Wins (1) ===
Year	Championship	18 holes	Winning score	Margin	Runner-up
1896	U.S. Open	2 shot deficit	(78-74=152)	3 strokes	(England) Horace Rawlins

=== Results timeline ===
Foulis played only in the U.S. Open.

Tournament	1895	1896	1897	1898	1899	1900	1901	1902	1903	1904	1905	1906	1907	1908	1909	1910	1911
U.S. Open	T3	1	T3	WD	T18	T14	11	T20	WD	9	T32	T22					47

Win
Top 10
Did not play

WD = Withdrew
"T" indicates a tie for a place
