= Robert Foulis =

Robert Foulis may refer to:

- Robert Foulis (printer) (1707–1776), Scottish printer and publisher
- Robert Foulis (inventor) (1796–1866), Canadian inventor
