= David J. Foulis =

American mathematician

David James Foulis (July 26, 1930 – April 3, 2018) was an American mathematician known for his research on the algebraic foundations of quantum mechanics. He spent much of his career at the University of Massachusetts Amherst, retiring in 1997 but continuing to be very active in mathematics as professor emeritus. He is the namesake of Foulis semigroups, an algebraic structure that he studied extensively under the alternative name of Baer *-semigroups.

== Education ==
Foulis was born on July 26, 1930, in Hinsdale, Illinois, the son of professional golfer Jim Foulis. As a teenager he moved with his family to Florida, and he graduated magna cum laude from the University of Miami with a degree in physics in 1952. He stayed at Miami for a master's degree in mathematics in 1953. He spent the following year as a graduate student at Tulane University, and then visited the University of Chicago for two years with Irving Kaplansky and Paul Halmos as mentors. Returning to Tulane, he completed his Ph.D. in 1958 under the supervision of one of Kaplansky's students, Fred Boyer Wright, Jr.

== Career ==
After completing his doctorate, Foulis taught for one year in the mathematics department at Lehigh University, four years at Wayne State University, and two years at the University of Florida before moving to the University of Massachusetts as a professor of mathematics and statistics in 1965. He retired in 1997, but continued to be active as a researcher after retirement.

Foulis's doctoral students at Massachusetts have included DIMACS associate director Melvin Janowitz, graph theorist David Sumner, and mathematics and statistics educator and textbook author Patti Frazer Lock.

== Publications ==
The most highly cited of Foulis's research papers is "Effect algebras and unsharp quantum logics" (Foundations of Physics, 1994) which he wrote with his former student and later University of Massachusetts colleague Mary K. Bennett. Foulis is also the author of seven undergraduate textbooks in mathematics. One of his texts, a large red book on calculus, was used as a prop in the 1985 romantic comedy movie The Sure Thing.
