= Tom Dunn (golf course architect) =

Scottish golfer, golf club maker and golf courses designer (1849–1902)

Thomas Dunn
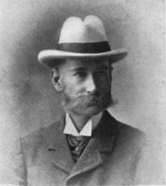
- Tom Dunn, c. 1889

Personal information
- Nationality: Scotland
- Born: 29 December 1849 Musselburgh, Midlothian, Scotland
- Died: May 1902 (aged 52) Blagdon, Somerset, England
- Spouse: Isabella Gourlay
- Children: Isabella May Gourlay Dunn; John Duncan Dunn; Seymour Dunn; Norah Eleanor Dunn

Career
- Sport: Golf
- Turned professional: 1869

Best results in major championships
- The Open Championship: 6th: 1868

Thomas Dunn (29 December 1849 – May 1902) was a golfer, golf club maker and prolific architect of many golf courses in the early 20th century. Less celebrated than his contemporary, Old Tom Morris, Dunn created many functional layouts and helped lead the development of courses away from the coast into inland heathland locations, notably many around London. In total, Dunn had four top-10 finishes in the Open Championship.

== Early life ==
Dunn was born in Musselburgh, the son of Willie Dunn Snr (1821–1878).

Willie Dunn Snr and his twin brother, Jamie, were notable golfers of their time, playing against Allan Robertson and Old Tom Morris. Willie was apprenticed under the Gourlay family. At the time of Tom's birth, Willie Dunn Snr was greenkeeper at Blackheath where he remained until 1864.

Dunn learned the game and family business of golf, including club manufacture and groundsmanship, from his father. Dunn also had an elder sister; Catherine (b. 1842 also in Musselburgh), and four younger sisters; Rebecca (b. 1852), Janet (b. 1854), Jemima (b. 1856) and Sarah (b. 1858). His younger brother, William, (b. 1864 and known as Willie Jnr), like his younger sisters, was also born at Blackheath.

In 1864 the Dunn family moved back to Scotland and Willie Dunn Snr was employed at Leith Links.

== Golf career ==
Dunn competed in the Open in 1868 finishing in 6th place. He competed a further seven times until 1886 but never improved his position. Dunn's professional career started at North Berwick in 1869. Soon after, in 1870, he moved to the London Scottish Golf Club at Wimbledon and was formally the club's professional until 1880. In 1871, he extended the course to eighteen holes. Years later, Dunn revealed that this was initially 19 holes! Also in 1871, he joined his father at Leith Links.

Following marriage to Isabella May Gourlay, Dunn established a golf club making business at his home on Wimbledon Common. His two sons, John Duncan (b. 1873) and William Gourlay (b. 1874) were born here. Dunn's first daughter, Isabella May Gourlay Dunn, was born in early 1880. Dunn's younger brother, Willie Dunn Jnr, was apprenticed to him whilst at London Scottish Golf Club in Wimbledon. During this period, Dunn's father died in Millhill, Inveresk in 1878 aged 59. Dunn and family returned to North Berwick in 1882 and Dunn became father to a third son, Seymour in 1882 and a second daughter, Norah Eleanor, in 1886.

Dunn left North Berwick for France during 1889 without informing his employer. Complaints were received that he was failing to attend his duties. Dunn subsequently wrote to the club explaining that he had been advised to head south for the good of his health and had been taken more ill whilst away. The club discharged him but made him a final payment.

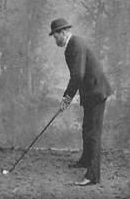
Dunn at Meyrick Park in 1895

== Tooting Bec ==
In 1889, he was appointed greenkeeper and club maker to the Tooting Bec Golf Club where he laid out the Furzedown course. Dunn had taught the prime minister, Arthur Balfour, to play golf at North Berwick and while Parliament was sitting Balfour golfed at Tooting Bec. The popularity of golf exploded during this period and demand for Dunn's services to lay out new courses was high.

== Meyrick Park ==
In 1895 Dunn was approached to lay out a new course in Bournemouth. Given a choice of three locations, he selected the Meyrick Park site and remained as professional for five years. His son, John, continued the club-making while Dunn concentrated on designing golf courses.

== Emigration to USA ==
John emigrated to the US and was appointed manager of the West Florida Golf Association. At the end of five years in Bournemouth, Dunn's health began to fail. Dunn also emigrated to America in 1899 and assisted his son. Tom was employed by Oriental and Manhattan Hotel group to supervise their Florida golf courses.

Tom Dunn returned to England in 1901 and took up residence at Hangar Lane. Soon thereafter he accepted a position as head professional and greenkeeper at Hanger Hill where he laid out the course.

== Death and legacy ==
Dunn died of tuberculosis at the Nordrach Clinic in Blagdon, Somerset in early May 1902 aged 52 years.

After his death, but not before, critics derided his predictable use of hazards and his 'hit and run' staking-out methods. However, he provided a service at a time when very few people understood the basic architectural principles required for a functional layout, and Dunn had the skill and experience to deliver to order. Dunn himself claimed to have laid out a total of 137 courses, and, although some have closed and many since been further embellished and developed, the basic underlying layouts of many of Dunn's courses remain.

Although Beckenham, now Beckenham Place Park Golf Club, is sometimes attributed to Dunn, it was laid out c. 1907 after Dunn's death.

== Results in major championships ==
Tournament	1868	1869	1870	1871	1872	1873	1874	1875	1876	1877	1878	1879	1880	1881	1882	1883	1884	1885	1886
The Open Championship	6	8									T9	T20		T18		T17	T7		T16

Note: Dunn played only in The Open Championship.

Top 10
Did not play

"T" indicates a tie for a place
