= Joe Lloyd =

English golfer

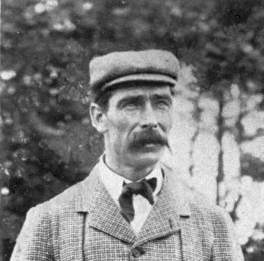

Personal information
- Full name: Joseph Lloyd
- Nickname: The General
- Nationality: England
- Born: 1864 Hoylake, England
- Died: 1900s

Career
- Sport: Golf
- Status: Professional
- Professional wins: 1

Best results in major championships (wins: 1)
- Masters Tournament: DNP
- PGA Championship: DNP
- U.S. Open: Won: 1897
- The Open Championship: 17th/T17: 1893, 1894

Joseph Lloyd (1864–19??) was an English professional golfer who won the third U.S. Open at the Chicago Golf Club in 1897.

== Early life ==
In 1864, Lloyd was born. He grew up playing at Royal Liverpool Golf Club at Hoylake. He was an expert at making and repairing clubs.

== Professional career ==
Lloyd was the first golf professional in France, being hired in 1883 at the Pau Golf Club in Pau, France, by Englishmen spending their winters there. One of those Englishmen was John Cumming Macdona, a member at Hoylake and Pau, but who had formed a friendship with Fleetwood Sandeman of the famous Port and Sherry company. Fleetwood Sandeman was the first Captain in 1883 at Hayling Golf Club in Hampshire, where the Sandeman family had a summer house, and Macdona arranged for Joseph Lloyd to become the first professional at Hayling where Lloyd helped lay out the first 9-hole course on the seafront. 'The General', as Lloyd was popularly known, left Hayling after two seasons. Lloyd was the first professional of the newly opened West Cornwall Golf Club, Lelant, Cornwall in 1890.

From 1895 to 1909 Lloyd spent his summers as the club professional at the Essex County Club, in Manchester, Massachusetts, United States, and was succeeded by Donald Ross as the club professional there. Lloyd retired from the Pau Golf Club in 1925.

Lloyd played in the 1896 U.S. Open, and led at the halfway point, but finished tied for 7th place 6 strokes behind.

Lloyd was known as a player capable of extremely long drives and was considered to be one of the longest hitters in his day. At the 1897 U.S. Open he was trailing entering the final round. He hit a long drive at the 465-yard 18th hole, following with a wonderful brassie shot to within 8 feet of the pin. He proceeded to sink the putt for an eagle 3 on the par-5 hole that gave him a one-stroke victory over Willie Anderson (who would later win four U.S. Opens). No golfer since has won the Open with an eagle on the final hole.

== Major championships ==
=== Wins (1) ===
| Year | Championship | 18 holes | Winning score | Margin | Runner-up |
|---|---|---|---|---|---|
| 1897 | U.S. Open | 4 shot deficit | 83-79=162 | 1 stroke | (Scotland) Willie Anderson |

=== Results timeline ===
Lloyd played in only the U.S. Open and The Open Championship.

| Tournament | 1893 | 1894 | 1895 | 1896 | 1897 | 1898 | 1899 | 1900 | 1901 | 1902 | 1903 | 1904 | 1905 | 1906 | 1907 | 1908 |
|---|---|---|---|---|---|---|---|---|---|---|---|---|---|---|---|---|
| U.S. Open | NYF | NYF | | T7 | 1 | 4 | | | 20 | | T24 | | T16 | | | WD |
| The Open Championship | T17 | 17 | | | T20 | | | | | | | | | | | |

Win
Top 10
Did not play

NYF = Tournament not yet founded
WD = Withdrew
"T" indicates a tie for a place
