= Willie Dunn Sr. =

Scottish professional golfer (1821–1878)

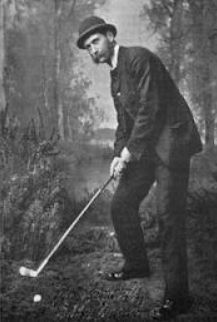
- Willie Dunn Sr. (c. 1865)

Personal information
- Nationality: Scotland
- Born: 19 August 1821 Musselburgh, Scotland
- Died: 14 February 1878 (aged 56) Musselburgh, Scotland

Career
- Sport: Golf
- Status: Professional

Best results in major championships
- Masters Tournament: DNP
- PGA Championship: DNP
- U.S. Open: DNP
- The Open Championship: 7th: 1861

Willie Dunn Sr. (19 August 1821 – 14 February 1878) was a Scottish professional golfer who played during the mid-to-late 19th century. He was born in Musselburgh, Scotland, in 1821 and died there. Dunn had three top-10 finishes in the Open Championship, with his best result being seventh in the 1861 Open Championship.

== Early life ==
Willie Dunn was born in Musselburgh, Scotland, on 19 August 1821. Along with his twin brother, Jamie, he played in many challenge matches between 1840–60. Dunn apprenticed under the Gourlay family and was keeper of the greens at Blackheath until 1864 when he returned to the Thistle Golf Club at Leith Links.

== Golf career ==
=== The 1861 Open Championship ===
Dunn placed seventh in the 1861 Open Championship, carding consistent rounds of 61-59-60=180.

The 1861 Open Championship was a golf competition held at Prestwick Golf Club, Ayrshire, Scotland. It was the second Open Championship and the first to open to amateurs as well as professionals. Ten professionals and eight amateurs contested the event, with Tom Morris Sr. winning the championship by 4 shots from Willie Park Sr.

== Family ==
Dunn had two sons, Thomas Dunn and Willie Dunn Jr.

== Death ==
Dunn died in Musselburgh, Scotland, of epithelioma of the lips—a form of skin cancer—in 1878.

== Results in major championships ==
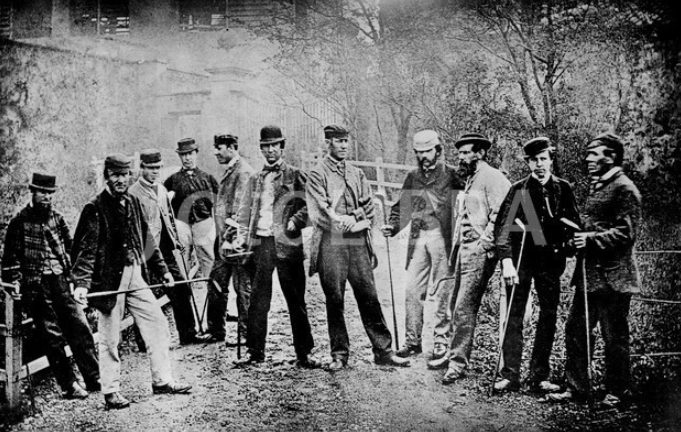
Dunn (fifth from right) at Leith Links in 1867

Tournament	1861	1862	1863	1864	1865	1866	1867	1868	1869	1870	1871	1872	1873	1874	1875	1876	1877
The Open Championship	7					10	10	12			NT			T22			F?

Note: Dunn played only in the Open Championship.

Top 10
Did not play

NT = no tournament
F? = competed, finish unknown
"T" indicates a tie for a place
