= 1896 U.S. Open (golf) =

Coordinates: 40.894°N 72.440°W

Tournament information
- Dates: July 18, 1896
- Location: Southampton, New York
- Course: Shinnecock Hills Golf Club
- Organized by: USGA
- Format: Stroke play − 36 holes

Statistics
- Length: 4,423 yards (4,044 m)
- Field: 35
- Cut: none
- Prize fund: $330
- Winner's share: $150

Champion
- (Scotland) James Foulis
- 152

Location in the United States
Location in New York

The 1896 U.S. Open was the second U.S. Open, held July 18 at Shinnecock Hills Golf Club in Southampton, New York. James Foulis won his only major title, three strokes ahead of runner-up Horace Rawlins, the defending champion. Like the first Open, it was a sideshow to the U.S. Amateur. However, there were 35 entrants and 28 finished the 36 holes.

Before play began, several players signed a petition stating that they would not play if John Shippen, an African-American, and Oscar Bunn, a Native American, were allowed to play. The petition was denied, however, and the players relented. Shippen, a caddie at Shinnecock Hills, shot an opening round of 78, which placed him just two back of leader Joe Lloyd. He was in a position to win the championship until an eleven on the 13th hole of the final round, and finished tied for sixth.

Foulis, the third-place finisher in the inaugural U.S. Open the year before, recorded rounds of 78–74 to prevail by three over Rawlins. Foulis' 74 set a record that was not broken until 1903, after the rubber-core ball had come into use.

At 4,423 yards (4,044 m), Shinnecock Hills played as the shortest course in U.S. Open history. Its next U.S. Open was 90 years later, in 1986. By then, the course had been lengthened to 6,912 yards (6,320 m).

== Round summaries ==
=== First round ===
Saturday, July 18, 1896 (morning)

Place	Player	Score
T1	(Scotland) Willie Dunn Jr.	78
T1	(Scotland) James Foulis	78
T1	(England) Joe Lloyd	78
T1	(United States) John Shippen	78
T1	(Canada) Andrew Smith (a)	78
T1	(England) Willie Tucker	78
T7	(Scotland) George Douglas	79
T7	(England) Horace Rawlins	79
9	(England) Alfred Ricketts	80
T10	(Scotland) Tom Gourlay	82
T10	(Scotland) Buff Wilson	82

=== Final round ===
Saturday, July 18, 1896 (afternoon)

Place	Player	Score	Money ($)
1	(Scotland) James Foulis	78-74=152	150
2	(England) Horace Rawlins	79-76=155	100
T3	(Scotland) George Douglas	79-79=158	50
T3	(Canada) Andrew Smith (a)	78-80=158	0
T5	(United States) John Shippen	78-81=159	25
T5	(Scotland) H. J. Whigham (a)	82-77=159	0
T7	(England) Joe Lloyd	78-82=160	5
T7	(England) Willie Tucker	78-82=160	5
9	(Scotland) Buff Wilson	82-80=162	0
10	(England) Alfred Ricketts	80-83=163	0

Amateurs: Smith (158), Whigham (159), Macdonald (83, WD).
