= H. J. Whigham =

Scottish writer and golfer

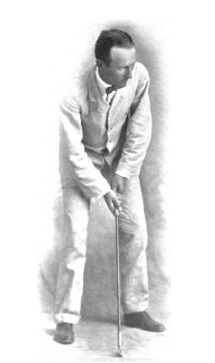
- Whigham, c. 1897

Personal information
- Full name: Henry James Whigham
- Nationality: Scotland
- Born: 24 December 1869 Tarbolton, Scotland
- Died: 17 March 1954 (aged 84) Southampton, New York

Career
- Sport: Golf
- Status: Amateur

Best results in major championships (wins: 2)
- U.S. Open: T5: 1896
- The Open Championship: 49th: 1893
- U.S. Amateur: Won: 1896, 1897

Henry James Whigham (24 December 1869 – 17 March 1954) was a Scottish writer and amateur golfer. He won the U.S. Amateur golf tournament in 1896 and 1897. Following his first win in the U.S. Amateur, he wrote a golf instruction book. In 1896 he finished fifth in the U.S. Open held at Shinnecock Hills Golf Club, Southampton, New York.

== Early life ==
Whigham was born in Tarbolton, Scotland, one of six brothers and four sisters to David Dundas Whigham and Ellen Murray (née Campbell). His sisters Molly and Sybil Whigham also played golf well. He went to America in 1893 for the Chicago World's Fair to demonstrate golf. This was arranged by Charles B. Macdonald, who was acquainted with Whigham's father, David Dundas, while they were students at the University of St Andrews in Scotland. Whigham would go on to become Macdonald's son-in-law, marrying his daughter Frances. They had a daughter, Sybil.

Whigham learned the game of golf studying under Willie Campbell and Joe Lloyd.

== Career ==
Whigham returned to Chicago as an instructor at Lake Forest College in English and also as a lecturer at other universities in the midwest. Later he went on to become a drama critic for the Chicago Tribune, until leaving to work as a war correspondent.

Whigham became editor-in-chief of Town & Country magazine in 1910, a position he held until 1935. Whigham was the author of How to Play Golf, a self-help book designed to teach the reader the basic rules of the game. A second edition of the book was republished and released in March 2011 by Library Tales Publishing.

== Death ==
Whigham died in Southampton, New York, at the age of 84.

== Major championships ==
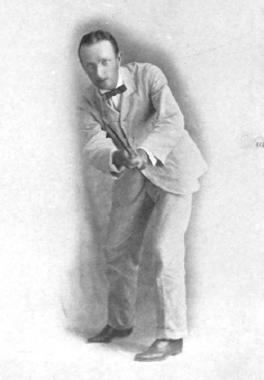
Whigham in the golf swing follow through, c. 1897

=== Amateur wins (2) ===
Year	Championship	Winning score	Runner-up
1896	U.S. Amateur	8 & 7	(United States) Joseph G. Thorp
1897	U.S. Amateur	8 & 6	(United States) W. Rossiter Betts

=== Results timeline ===
Note: Whigham played in only U.S. Open, U.S. Amateur and The Open Championship.

Tournament	1893	1894	1895	1896	1897	1898
U.S. Open	NYF	NYF		T5	T8 LA	
U.S. Amateur	NYF	NYF		1 M	1	DNQ
The Open Championship	49					

M = Medalist
LA = Low amateur

Win
Top 10
Did not play

NYF = Tournament not yet founded
"T" indicates a tie for a place
DNQ = Did not qualify for match play portion

Source for U.S. Open and U.S. Amateur: USGA Championship Database

Source for British Open: www.opengolf.com

== Works ==
- Manchuria and Korea (1904)
- How To Play Golf
