= Chicago Golf Club =

Private golf club in Illinois, U.S.

- Location within the United States Location within Illinois
- 41°50′55″N 88°06′58″W

Club information
- Location: Wheaton, Illinois, U.S.
- Elevation: 748 ft (228 m)
- Established: 1892; 134 years ago
- Type: Private
- Operator: John Guyton
- Tota holes: 18
- Tournaments: U.S. Open: 1897; 1900; 1911; Walker Cup: 1928; 2005
- Designed by: Charles B. Macdonald
- Par: 70
- Length: 6,950 yards (6,355 m)
- Course rating: 73.8
- Slope rating: 137
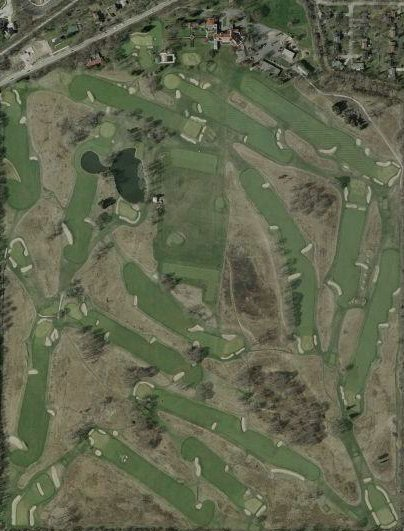
- Layout of course from space

Chicago Golf Club is a private golf club in the Midwestern United States, located in Wheaton, Illinois, a suburb west of Chicago. It is the second home of the club, the first being Belmont Golf Club in Downers Grove, Illinois, the site of the oldest 18 hole course in North America. It was one of the five founding clubs of the United States Golf Association (USGA) in 1894. The club was listed on the National Register of Historic Places in 2020.

The club has hosted several prominent events, including multiple U.S. Opens and Walker Cups, and was founded by renowned course designer and World Golf Hall of Fame member Charles Blair Macdonald. In July 2018, the club hosted the inaugural U.S. Senior Women's Open, created as the 14th USGA national championship.

== History ==
Known as the Father of Golf in Chicago, designer Macdonald went to college in Scotland at the University of St Andrews, where he learned to play the game. He brought back a set of clubs, and in early 1888, on the Lake Forest estate of a friend, C.B. Farwell, and his son-in-law, Hobart Chatfield-Taylor, laid out seven informal golf holes on an interesting piece of lakefront property known as "Bluff's Edge". His group of friends were fascinated by the new game and demanded a course be built on a dedicated site. In late spring of 1892, Macdonald passed around a hat with his friends, who contributed $10 each for a total of two or three hundred dollars. Macdonald spent that money in laying out a nine-hole course, about 23 miles (37 km) west of Chicago Union Station, on the stock farm of A. Haddow Smith at Belmont, located one block north of the Chicago, Burlington and Quincy Railroad line. This was to become the first golf course built west of the Alleghenies, and second to Shinnecock Hills in Long Island, New York, which opened 12 holes in 1891.

With contacts in Scotland, Macdonald next cabled the Royal Liverpool Golf Club and ordered six sets of clubs. As soon as they arrived, his newfound associates were soon bitten by the golf bug.

The first American woman to win an Olympic event, Margaret Abbott, was a member at the Chicago Golf Club in the 1890s.

In the spring of 1893, Macdonald wrote in his c. 1925 book, Scotland's Gift – Golf, that he increased the number of holes at Belmont to 18, creating the first 18-hole golf course in North America. On July 18, 1893, the charter was granted for the Chicago Golf Club.

The club became so popular that, in 1894, the members bought a piece of property to build an improved 18-hole course. They purchased a 200-acre (81 ha) parcel of the Patrick farm in Wheaton, for a complete sum totaling $28,000, which became "a first class 18-hole course of 6,500 yards." The site was chosen because of its vast rolling hills covered with native grasses, which reminded Macdonald of Scotland.

Macdonald designed the links-style layout himself; since he was a chronic slicer, he routed the holes so that both nines would play in a clockwise fashion so that he would stay out of trouble. Once the private land adjacent to the course became developed, a new rule was needed for errant golf balls leaving the premises. The United States Golf Association Rule of Golf for "Out Of Bounds" (27-1) had its origin at Chicago Golf Club.

Ossian Cole Simonds was commissioned to design the landscape architecture for the course at the Wheaton property in 1894. O.C. Simonds went on to do the landscape architecture for many famous Chicago properties including Lincoln Park, the Morton Arboretum and other golf courses including the Glen View Golf Club in 1897.

The Chicago clubhouse was designed by renowned Chicago architect Jarvis Hunt.

Chicago Golf Club

History
- Opened: 1902
- Closed: 1957

Services
Preceding station	Chicago Aurora and Elgin Railroad	Following station
Plamondon toward Aurora	Aurora Branch	Emory toward Wheaton
Location

Around 1902, the Chicago Aurora and Elgin Railroad constructed an electrified third-rail railroad between the far western terminus of the Metropolitan West Side Elevated Railroad at 52nd Avenue (now Laramie Avenue) in Chicago, and the Fox River towns of Aurora and Elgin. The branch line splitting to Aurora from the downtown Wheaton station traveled just past the main entrance to Chicago Golf Club, where was built a splendid brick station. A large majority of the club members commuted from downtown Chicago, and on weekends and special occasions a luxuriously appointed wood-paneled club car with a well-stocked bar and linen tablecloth dinner service was employed to ferry golfers out to the Chicago Golf Club. At the club's station was a siding, where the club car was parked until it was needed for the evening return trip.

Macdonald also brought the Foulis brothers to Chicago from St Andrews, Scotland, to help grow the new game. The Foulis' father, James Foulis Sr., worked as a foreman in the clubmaking shop of the legendary Old Tom Morris—which was located across the street from the Old Course at St Andrews. Macdonald invited Robert Foulis to be the first club professional at Chicago Golf, but, as he was already under contract at a separate club, he passed the offer to his brother, James Foulis, who became the golf professional at Chicago Golf in 1895; he had worked for both Old Tom Morris and clubmaker Robert Forgan.

In 1905, Jim was succeeded by his brother David Foulis, who stayed at the Wheaton course until 1916. In addition to their skills as golf professionals, clubmakers and players, they were responsible for many innovations to the game of golf. They were first to apply the bramble (reverse-dimple) pattern on the cover of Coburn Haskell's new rubber-cored wound golf ball, and in response to the demands of the new ball developed the "mashie-niblick", the modern 7-iron, which fell between the traditional mashie (5-iron) and niblick (9-iron). Jim and Dave also designed many golf courses, most of which still exist today. While at Chicago Golf, Dave brought the metal hole-liner to the U.S. from Scotland and improved the design to hold the flagstick upright, even in the wind. Another brother, John, was a ballmaker and bookkeeper at the club until his death in 1907.

After the Chicago Golf Club vacated the Belmont location, Herbert J. Tweedie, a one-time member of the Royal Liverpool Golf Club, formed the Belmont Golf Club, of which the charter was granted in 1899. By that time, however, the course was back to nine holes. The original site has remained a golf course through the years, passing through several owners, and now is owned and operated as a public facility by the Downers Grove Park District.

Current members include Cleveland Golf founder Roger Cleveland, former ServiceMaster chief executive Jonathan P. Ward, actor Chris O'Donnell, former ServiceMaster vice chairman Charles Stair and former Amoco chairman H. Laurence Fuller. Two-time Masters champion Ben Crenshaw is a non-resident member, and recently deceased members include radio great Paul Harvey and International Harvester scion Brooks McCormick. Club President Bob King (1990–1991) led the process which allowed African Americans and women to be admitted as members of the club. Despite being in close proximity to multiple all-male clubs, Chicago Golf Club began admitting female members in 2001 with the admission of Judith Whinfrey. Chicago Golf Club admitted its first African-American member, Charles Thurston, in 1993. (History collected from Chicagoland Golf magazine, April 1992, by Phil Kosin)

== Course ==
Hole	Name	Yards	Par	Hole	Name	Yards	Par
1	Valley	450	4	10	Short	149	3
2	Road	481	4	11	Dogleg	410	4
3	Biarittz	219	3	12	Punchbowl	465	4
4	Long	549	5	13	Eden	181	3
5	Leven	365	4	14	Cape	356	4
6	Principal’s Nose	399	4	15	Ginger Ale	400	4
7	Redan	211	3	16	Raynor's Prize	530	5
8	Narrows	445	4	17	Double Plateau	467	4
9	Pond	448	4	18	Home	425	4
Out		3,567	35	In		3,383	35
Source:				Total		6,950	70

== USGA Championships ==
=== 1897 U.S. Open and Amateur ===
The 1897 Open was the first tournament hosted at Charles Blair MacDonald's club, as well as the first championship west of Appalachia. Macdonald ended up losing the championship on his home turf in the semifinals to W. Rosstier Betts. The actual open championship was played over 36 holes in one day between the semifinals and finals of the Amateur championship and was won by Scotsman Joe Lloyd with a score of 162. Local club professional James Foulis finished in third place two shots behind Lloyd. Eventual Amateur champion H. J. Whigham finished as the low amateur in a tie for eighth.

=== 1900 U.S. Open ===
The 1900 Open was the sole USGA Championship won by Jerseyman Harry Vardon, who is regarded by many to be one of the greatest players of all time. Vardon competed in the championship after finishing a 90 match tour of the United States and Canada. He won the Open by two strokes over Englishman J. H. Taylor.

=== 1911 U.S. Open ===
The 1911 Open was the first of back to back championships won by John McDermott. This came following a defeat in a playoff in the 1910 Open in his hometown of Philadelphia. McDermott was the first American to win the Championship, and to this day is the youngest ever to win the U.S. Open at 19 years of age. McDermott won in a playoff over Mike Brady and Chicago Golf Club member George Simpson. He would go on to successfully defend his title the following year.

=== 1928 Walker Cup ===
The 1928 Walker Cup was the first championship played across the newly designed Seth Raynor course at Chicago Golf Club. The American team crushed their GB&I foes 11 to 1. The team is widely regarded as one of the greatest Walker Cup teams of all time, having a combined 6 U.S. Open and 12 U.S. Amateur Championships among the eight of them. The team featured superstars, such as Bobby Jones, Francis Ouimet, and Chick Evans.

=== 2005 Walker Cup ===
The 2005 Walker Cup was played on August 13 and 14, 2005. Team United States won 12½ to 11½.

=== 2018 U.S. Senior Women's Open ===
The 2018 U.S. Senior Women's Open was the inaugural edition of the championship. It was won by 1987 U.S. Women's Open champion Laura Davies, who went on to complete a "women's senior slam" by, three months later, winning the Senior LPGA Championship.

== Tournament results ==
Notable events at Chicago Golf Club:

=== U.S. Open ===
- 1897 Joe Lloyd
- 1900 Harry Vardon
- 1911 John McDermott

=== U.S. Amateur ===
- 1897 H. J. Whigham
- 1905 Chandler Egan
- 1909 Robert A. Gardner
- 1912 Jerome Travers

=== U.S. Women's Amateur ===
- 1903 Bessie Anthony

=== U.S. Senior Amateur ===
- 1979 William C. Campbell

=== Walker Cup ===
- 1928 United States 11, Great Britain & Ireland 1
- 2005 United States 12½, Great Britain & Ireland 11½

=== Western Junior ===
- 1992 John Curley

=== U.S. Women's Senior Open ===
- 2018 Laura Davies
