= Newport Country Club =

Historic club in Newport, Rhode Island

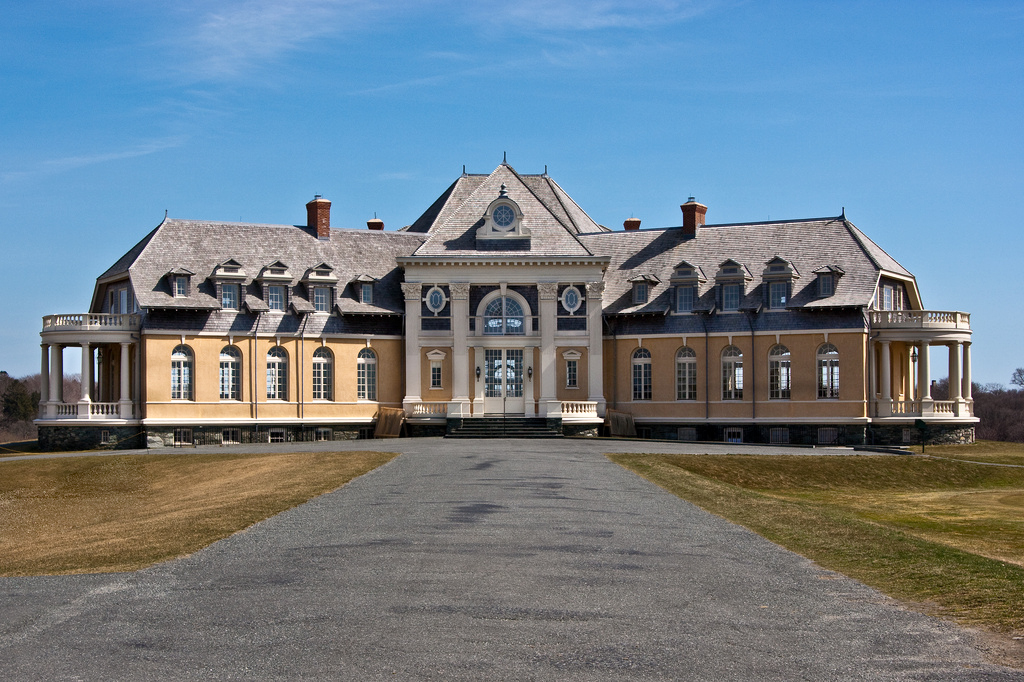
- Clubhouse, circa 2010

- Location within the United States Location within Rhode Island
- 41.462°N 71.347°W

Club information
- Location: Newport, Rhode Island, U.S.
- Elevation: 10–50 feet (3–15 m)
- Established: 1893; 133 years ago
- Type: Private
- Total holes: 18
- Tournaments: U.S. Open (1895); U.S. Amateur (1895, 1995); U.S. Women's Open (2006); U.S. Senior Open (2024)
- Designed by: William "Willie" Davis (1894, 1899); A. W. Tillinghast(1923)
- Par: 70
- Length: 7,075 yards (6,469 m)
- Course rating: 75.4
- Slope rating: 135
- Clubhouse, ca. 1897

Newport Country Club is a historic private golf club in Newport, Rhode Island, US. Founded in 1893, it hosted both the first U.S. Amateur Championship and the first U.S. Open in 1895.

== History ==
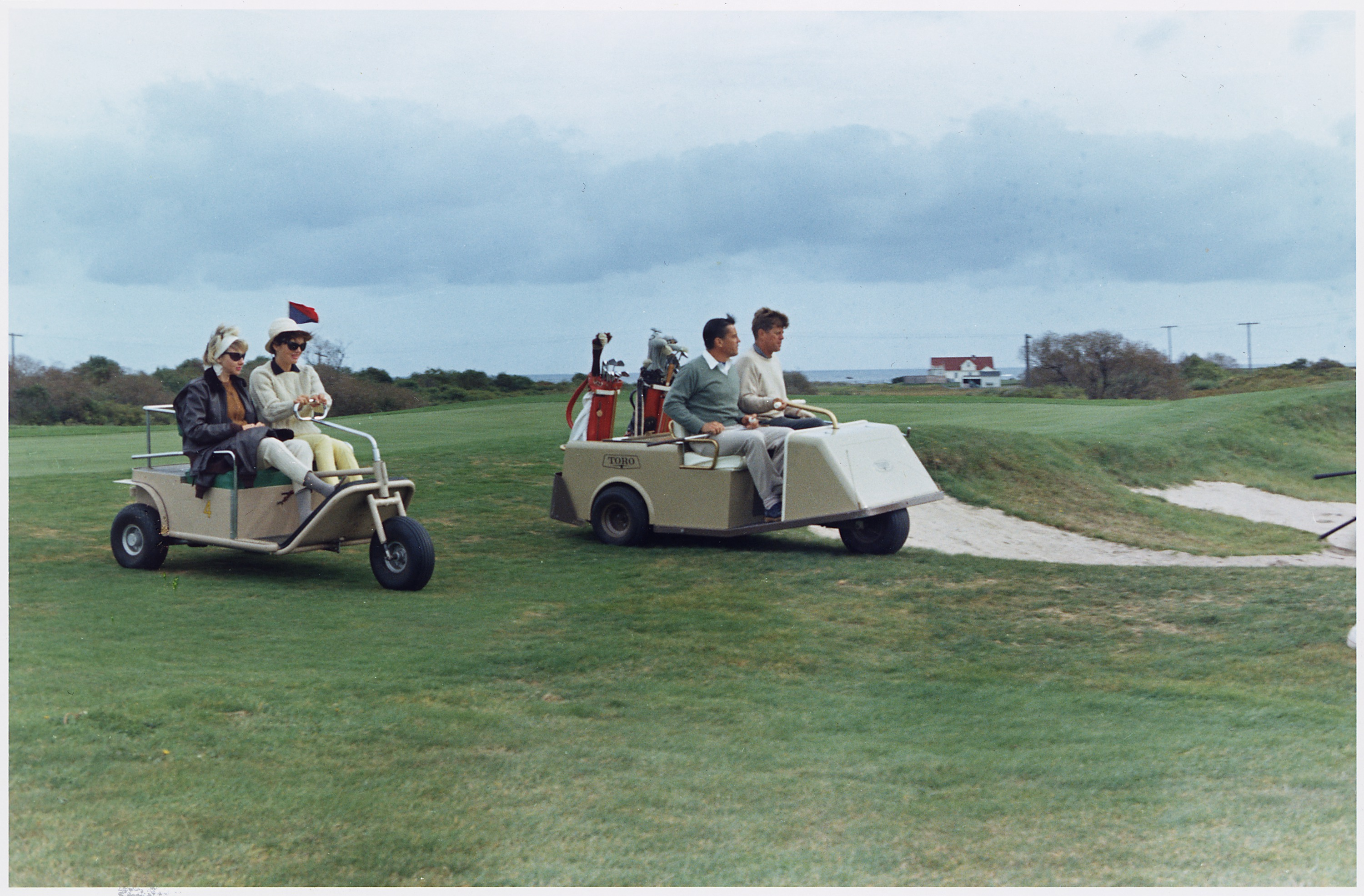
Mrs. Bradlee, Mrs. Kennedy, Ben Bradlee, President Kennedy golfing at Newport Country Club

Theodore Havemeyer, a wealthy sportsman whose family owned the American Sugar Company, played the game of golf on a trip to Pau in the south of France in 1889 and returned to his summer home in Newport excited about its future. In 1890, he and his friends rented some property on the old Castle Hill Farm and played golf on a primitive course. He convinced a few pals from the summer colony's social elite, men such as John Jacob Astor IV, Perry Belmont, and Cornelius Vanderbilt II – to purchase the 140-acre (0.57 km^{2}) Rocky Farm property for $80,000 and establish the golf club in 1893.

At the time of the club's founding, Newport was at the peak of its prestige as the favorite summer colony of America's wealthy elite. The city had thus established one of America's earliest golf clubs since the sport was played almost exclusively by the rich when it was first introduced to the United States. The primitive course that they played upon in 1890 was bought roughly thirty years later and is now the site of seven holes (2–8) of the front nine.

== Tournaments ==
Anxious to host national competitions, Havemeyer invited the country's best amateurs to his new course for a championship in 1894. That December, Havemeyer held a meeting at New York City's Calumet Club with representatives from four other clubs: Saint Andrew's Golf Club in Hastings-on-Hudson, NY; Shinnecock Hills Golf Club in Southampton on Long Island, New York; The Country Club in Brookline, MA; and the Chicago Golf Club. These clubs agreed to form the Amateur Golf Association, the forerunner of the United States Golf Association (USGA).

In October 1895, Newport Country Club hosted both the first U.S. Amateur and the first U.S. Open. To this day, the U.S. Amateur champion is awarded the Havemeyer Trophy.

In celebration of the centennial of those first two USGA events, the club hosted the U.S. Amateur in 1995, won by defending champion Tiger Woods. Eleven years later, it was the site of the U.S. Women's Open in 2006, won by Annika Sörenstam in an 18-hole playoff. Newport was set to host the 41st U.S. Senior Open in June 2020, but the COVID-19 pandemic cancelled all age-specific tournaments on the USGA calendar. The event was deferred to 2024, and weather during the final round postponed the conclusion until Monday, extended with a playoff between Richard Bland and Hiroyuki Fujita, won by Bland on the fourth extra hole.

== Clubhouse ==
Whitney Warren designed the classic, Beaux Arts-style clubhouse on a largely barren farm overlooking Brenton Point in 1895. It was extensively renovated by Kirby Perkins Construction in 2005.

Warren's only other major Newport project at the time was a home for his sister, Edith, High Tide. This mansion, which overlooks Bailey's Beach and completed in 1900, hosted Michelle Wie for the week of the 2006 U.S. Women's Open.

== Course ==
The original nine-hole course was designed in 1894 by William "Willie" Davis, the club's first professional, and later expanded to 18 holes in 1899, again by Davis. This second nine was long thought to be designed by Donald Ross, but a recent discovery (2013) of an original scorecard (1899) refuted this. This information is in the recently written club history.

A. W. Tillinghast, famous for such designs as Winged Foot, Baltusrol, Bethpage Black, and the San Francisco Golf Club, was hired in 1923 to remodel the course layout. Since 1995, restoration on some of the course has been completed by Ron Forse.

=== Scorecard ===
	HOLE	BLACK	BLACK HCP	RED	WHITE	RED/WHITE HCP	PAR	BLUE HCP	BLUE
1	The First	459	1	480	442	15	4/5	11	427
2	The Cop	410	15	366	352	11	4	9	341
3	Ocean	347	17	328	312	17	4	15	228
4	Graves Point	242	7	220	209	5	3	7	181
5	Polo Shed	451	5	422	411	1	4	1	347
6	Lookout	440	11	383	359	9	4	13	287
7	Long Meadow	598	9	553	512	7	5	5	454
8	Willows	192	13	177	164	13	3	17	155
9	Orchard	470	3	422	406	3	4	3	381
OUT		3609		3351	3167		35/36		2801
10	Quarry	574	16	528	517	14	5	14	477
11	Harbour	321	18	298	289	18	4	18	245
12	Valley	463	2	477	436	16	4/5	10	396
13	Club	188	14	151	137	12	3	16	123
14	Plateau	209	10	189	172	6	3	12	159
15	Brenton Reef	473	4	411	403	2	4	2	391
16	Island	362	12	352	321	8	4	6	311
17	Pond	466	6	441	387	4	4	4	380
18	Home	420	8	379	365	10	4	8	318
IN		3476		3226	3027		35/36		2800
TOT		7085		6577	6194		70/72		5601

Tees	Slope	Rating
Black	135	75.4
Red	127	72.4
White	121	70.6
Blue	117	67.3
Women		
White	134	76.7
Blue	126	73.0

== Notable members ==
Notable former members include:

- John Jacob Astor IV, American businessman
- Oliver Belmont, American politician
- Perry Belmont, American politician and diplomat
- Robert Goelet, American heir, businessman and yachtsman
- Theodore Havemeyer, American businessman
- James Stillman, American businessman
- Cornelius Vanderbilt II, American businessman

== See also ==
- Brenton Point
