= Willie Dunn (golfer) =

British golfer (1864–1952)

Willie Dunn, Jr.
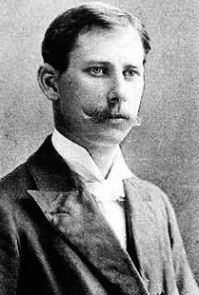
- Dunn, c. 1889

Personal information
- Full name: William Dunn, Jr.
- Nationality: England
- Born: c. 1864 Blackheath, London, England
- Died: August 1952 (aged 88) Putney, London, England

Career
- Sport: Golf
- Turned professional: c. 1882

Best results in major championships
- Masters Tournament: DNP
- PGA Championship: DNP
- U.S. Open: 2nd: 1895
- The Open Championship: 9th: 1883

William Dunn, Jr. (c. 1864 – August 1952) was an English professional golfer and golf course designer of Scottish descent. Dunn was born in Blackheath, London, England in about 1864. His best U.S. Open finish was second in the 1895 U.S. Open. He took home $100 as his share of the purse. His best known golf course designs are those found at the Shinnecock Hills Golf Club and the Apawamis Club.

== Early life ==
Dunn was born circa 1864 at Blackheath, London, England, the son of Willie Dunn Sr. At age 13, Dunn learned the art of making golf clubs while apprenticed under his older brother, Tom Dunn, who was the professional at London Scottish Golf Club on Wimbledon Common, where he had his home. By 1871 he had joined his father at Leith Links.

== Golf career ==
Dunn plied his trade while professional at Westward Ho! from 1886 to 1888 before traveling to Biarritz, France, where he instructed wealthy patrons on the fine art of swinging a golf club. It was in Biarritz where Dunn first made the acquaintance of the American millionaire William K. Vanderbilt. After arriving in the United States in 1893—a trip that was sponsored by Vanderbilt—Dunn spent the summer giving golf lessons at the Newport Golf Club in Rhode Island. After spending the winter back in his regular position at Biarritz, he made a return voyage to America. Golf was beginning to gain in popularity at this time and Dunn found ripe pickings in golf-related work and settled in the U.S. permanently.

His first professional position was at the Ardsley Country Club, Ardsley, New York, where he designed the course and settled down to a club-making business in 1896. He was joined by his nephew, John Duncan Dunn, who emigrated from England where he had been engaged with the firm of Dunn Brothers. The clubs the Dunns produced provided an interesting mix of traditional Scottish values and modern ingenuity. Early clubs from the Ardsley days were imported from Scotland and assembled in New York. Some of these irons bear a small eagle mark, a reference to his new home and were possibly forged by Robert Condie. Others were simply marked "Dunn Selected" in either script or block letters and dated from 1897 to 1903.

== Patents and golf club designs ==
One of Willie's first American patents (though it appears to have been applied for but never finally granted) was his "indestructible driver". Its head was a wood block encased in an aluminium shell, the wood being exposed at the face and on top.

In the early 1900s, Willie experimented with plastic-like substances, finally patenting several types of drivers and putters. The substance was known as pyralin and came in black and white versions. Clubs included standard drivers, duplex drivers and mallet putters and for manufacturing purposes the patents were assigned to the Kempshall Manufacturing Co. in Arlington, New Jersey.

== Playing career ==
=== 1895 U.S. Open ===
The 1895 U.S. Open was the first U.S. Open, held on Friday, 4 October, at Newport Golf Club in Newport, Rhode Island. Horace Rawlins won the inaugural U.S. Open title, two strokes ahead of runner-up Willie Dunn. Dunn had rounds of 89-86=175 and won $100.

=== 1897 U.S. Open ===
Dunn tied for third place in the 1897 U.S. Open, held 17 September at Chicago Golf Club in Wheaton, Illinois. Joe Lloyd won his only major title by one stroke from runner-up Willie Anderson. Dunn carded rounds of 87-81=168 and won $38 as his share of the purse.

=== 1898 U.S. Open ===
Dunn fired rounds of 85-87-87-85=344 and placed seventh in the 1898 U.S. Open, held at Myopia Hunt Club in South Hamilton, Massachusetts on 17–18 June 1898. He was not awarded any prize money. Scotland's Fred Herd captured his first, and only, U.S. Open title by seven strokes from Alex Smith.

== Golf courses designed by Dunn ==
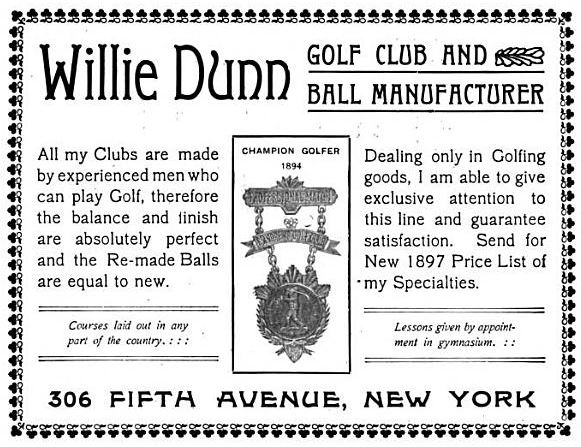
An 1897 advertisement of Dunn's golf business in New York.

(Source:)

- Algona Country Club – Semi-Private in Algona, Iowa
- The Apawamis Club – Private in Rye, New York
- Ardsley Country Club – Private in Ardsley-on-Hudson, New York
- Biarritz le Phare Golf Club – Private in Aquitaine, France
- Cranford Golf Club – Private in Cranford, New Jersey (now the Echo Lake Country Club)
- Elmira Country Club – Private in Elmira, New York
- Lambton Golf and Country Club (championship course) – Private in Toronto, Canada
- Maidstone Club – Private in East Hampton, New York (6 holes in 1894)
- Ocean City Golf Course – Public in Ocean City, New Jersey
- Saranac Inn Golf & Country Club – Public in Saranac Lake, New York
- Shinnecock Hills Golf Club – Private in Southampton, New York
- Lakeview Golf & Country Club - Private in Chariton, Iowa

== Family ==
Dunn was the son of Willie Dunn, Sr. and the brother of Tom Dunn also known as Thomas Dunn, a well-known golf course architect.

== Death and legacy ==
Dunn died in Putney, London, England, in early August 1952. He is best remembered for achieving four top-10 finishes in major championships and for his golf course design work.

== Results in major championships ==
Tournament	1882	1883	1884	1885	1886	1887	1888	1889	1890	1891	1892	1893	1894	1895	1896	1897	1898	1899
U.S. Open	NYF	NYF	NYF	NYF	NYF	NYF	NYF	NYF	NYF	NYF	NYF	NYF	NYF	2	12	T3	7	T33
The Open Championship	T34	9	T11	T34	T27	DNP	DNP	DNP	DNP	DNP	DNP	DNP	DNP	DNP	DNP	DNP	DNP	DNP

Note: Dunn played only in the U.S. Open and The Open Championship.

NYF = Tournament not yet founded
DNP = Did not play
"T" indicates a tie for a place
Yellow background for top-10
