= Horace Rawlins =

English professional golfer (1874–1935)

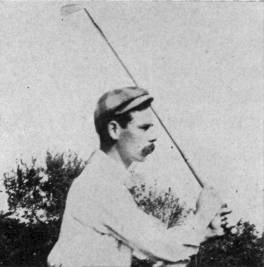

Personal information
- Full name: Horace Thomas Rawlins
- Nationality: England
- Born: 5 August 1874 Shanklin, England
- Died: 22 January 1935 (aged 60) Reading, Berkshire, England

Career
- Sport: Golf
- Status: Professional
- Professional wins: 1

Best results in major championships (wins: 1)
- Masters Tournament: DNP
- PGA Championship: DNP
- U.S. Open: Won: 1895
- The Open Championship: DNP

Horace Thomas Rawlins (5 August 1874 – 22 January 1935) was an English professional golfer who won the first U.S. Open Championship at Newport Country Club in October 1895.

Rawlins learnt to play golf while working as a caddie at the Royal Isle of Wight Golf Club on the Isle of Wight, England, In April 1895 he travelled to Newport, Rhode Island to be the assistant to the professional there, Willie Davis. Davis had laid out a new course which was used for inaugural U.S. Open. Rawlins was the surprise winner of the championship, finishing ahead of the better known professionals, including Davis and Willie Dunn.

After his success Rawlins worked as a professional at a number of golf clubs. He was married on the Isle of Wight in 1911 and with his wife pregnant with their first child he decided to settle permanently in England, making his final visit to the United States in 1912. After returning to England he played little golf. He died in Reading, Berkshire in 1935.

== Early life ==
In 1874, Rawlins was born at Shanklin on the Isle of Wight, England, the son of Thomas Horatio and Sarah Maria Rawlins. Thomas Horatio Rawlins had married Sarah Maria Brown in Bombay in 1871.

Rawlins had an older sister and two younger brothers; all of whom were born in India. Sarah was widowed by the time of the 1891 census and returned to the Isle of Wight, living in Brading. In 1891 Horace and his younger brother Harry are described as golf caddies. The Royal Isle of Wight Golf Club was situated nearby.

== Professional career ==
Rawlins was one of a number of near-contemporaries who learnt their golf at the now-defunct Royal Isle of Wight Golf Club and went on to become successful professional golfers. The group included Rowland Jones, the cousins Alfred and Walter Toogood, as well as his brother, Harry Rawlins.

Rawlins became the club professional at the Mid-Herts Golf Club when it opened in 1893. He played in a professional event at Stanmore Golf Club in June 1894 but finished well out of the prizes. Rawlins later moved to Raynes Park.

In early 1895, Rawlins travelled to the United States to take up a position at Newport Country Club in Newport, Rhode Island. The club hosted the inaugural U.S. Open on 4 October 1895, and he was one of 11 players to participate. Playing in just his third tournament, Rawlins shocked the more established Willie Dunn, winning the title by two strokes over 36 holes. The first U.S. Open was a one-day event played immediately after the three-day U.S. Amateur, which received much more attention at the time. Rawlins won $150 plus a $50 gold medal and the Open Championship Cup, which went to his club.

Rawlins returned to England in late 1895 and took a position at Crowborough Beacon under the professional Arthur Jackson for the winter. A match was arranged between Rawlins and James Braid on 7 March 1896 at Crowborough, Braid winning 5&3. Rawlins returned to America soon afterwards, moving to Sadaquada Golf Club near Utica, New York. Rawlins finished second in the 1896 U.S. Open, played on 18 July at Shinnecock Hills Golf Club.

Rawlins was also involved in golf course design, having in 1910 done some work on The Springhaven Club course in Wallingford, Pennsylvania, which was originally laid out by Ida Dixon in 1904.

After settling permanently in England in 1913 Rawlins seems to have played little golf. His only known appearance was as an unattached professional in the 1919 "Victory" tournament of the Southern Section of the PGA. Played at Walton Heath on 14 May, Rawlins scored 88 and 89 and finished well down the field.

== Personal life ==
In 1911, Rawlins married Cicely Margaret Wright at St Saviour, Shanklin. Cicely had been born in Great Chesterford, Essex in 1878.

Horace and Cicely travelled to the United States in April 1911 and April 1912 and spent the summer there. Their first child, Robert Cecil, was born in England in 1913, followed by Clifford Horace in 1916 and there is no indication that Rawlins returned to the United States after 1912.

Rawlins' mother, Sarah Maria, died in Wealdstone on 7 June 1914 aged 73 at which time Rawlins was described as a "draper".

== Death ==
Rawlins died on 22 January 1935 in Greenlands Nursing Home in Reading, Berkshire, now part of the site of the Royal Berkshire Hospital. He had been living in Barkham near Wokingham and was buried there at the parish church of St. James. His gravestone reads "In ever loving memory of Horace Thomas Rawlins who passed peacefully away January 22nd 1935 aged 60 years Thy will be done". Cicely died in early 1964 in Parkstone, Dorset, aged 85.

== Major championships ==
=== Wins (1) ===
| Year | Championship | 18 holes | Winning score | Margin | Runner-up |
|---|---|---|---|---|---|
| 1895 | U.S. Open | 2 shot deficit | 91-82=173 | 2 strokes | (Scotland) Willie Dunn |

=== Results timeline ===
| Tournament | 1895 | 1896 | 1897 | 1898 | 1899 | 1900 | 1901 | 1902 | 1903 | 1904 | 1905 | 1906 | 1907 | 1908 | 1909 | 1910 | 1911 | 1912 |
|---|---|---|---|---|---|---|---|---|---|---|---|---|---|---|---|---|---|---|
| U.S. Open | 1 | 2 | T8 | WD | T13 | T30 | T17 | T16 | 12 | 14 | T37 | | T25 | T21 | 60 | | | CUT |

Note: Rawlins only played in the U.S. Open.

Win
Top 10
Did not play

WD = withdrew
CUT = missed the half-way cut
"T" indicates a tie for a place
