= 1868 Open Championship =

Tournament information
- Dates: 23 September 1868
- Location: Prestwick, South Ayrshire, Scotland
- Course: Prestwick Golf Club

Statistics
- Field: 12 players
- Prize fund: £12
- Winner's share: £6

Champion
- (Scotland) Tom Morris, Jr.
- 154

Location in Scotland

The 1868 Open Championship was the ninth Open Championship and was held on 23 September at Prestwick Golf Club. Tom Morris, Jr. won the championship for the first time, by three shots from his father Tom Morris, Sr. Tom Morris, Jr. was just 17 years old and remains the youngest Open Championship winner.

Tom Morris, Jr. lead after the first round with a score of 51. Robert Andrew was in second place on 53 with John Allan and Tom Morris, Sr. tied for third on 54. Tom Morris, Sr. and Willie Park, Sr. both scored 50 in their second rounds. This gave Tom Morris, Sr. a one stroke lead over his son. Tom Morris, Jr. then scored 49 in his final round for a total of 154. His father finished second, three shots behind with Robert Andrew third, a further two strokes behind. 154 was a new record for the Open Championship, the old record having been 162, set by Andrew Strath in 1865.

== Final leaderboard ==
Wednesday, 23 September 1868

Place	Player	Score	Money
1	(Scotland) Tom Morris, Jr.	51-54-49=154	£6
2	(Scotland) Tom Morris, Sr.	54-50-53=157	£4
3	(Scotland) Robert Andrew	53-54-52=159	£2
4	(Scotland) Willie Park, Sr.	58-50-54=162	
5	(Scotland) Bob Ferguson	57-54-54=165	
6	(Scotland) Tom Dunn	59-54-54=167	
7	(Scotland) Bob Kirk	56-59-56=171	
T8	(Scotland) John Allan	54-55-63=172	
T8	(Scotland) Charlie Hunter	60-54-58=172	
10	(Scotland) Willie Dow	61-58-60=179	

Other sources give Tom Morris, Sr. a total of 155 and Willie Dow a score of 180.
