= 1861 Open Championship =

Tournament information
- Dates: 26 September 1861
- Location: Prestwick, South Ayrshire, Scotland
- Course: Prestwick Golf Club

Statistics
- Field: 18 players

Champion
- (Scotland) Tom Morris, Sr.
- 163

Location in Scotland

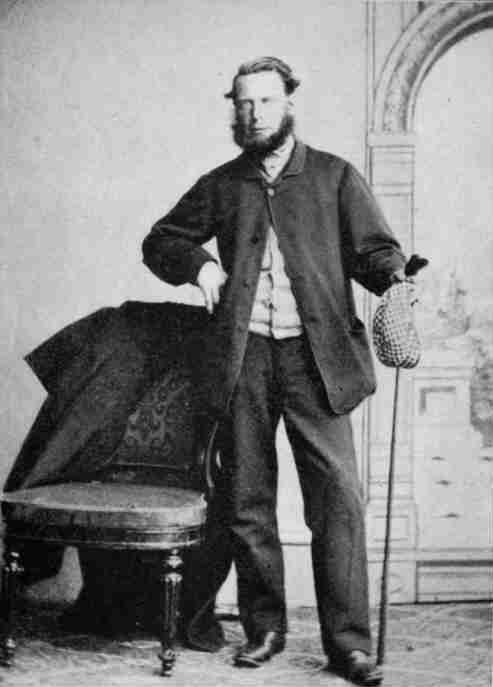
Tom Morris, Sr. winner of the Challenge Belt in 1861

The 1861 Open Championship was a golf competition held at Prestwick Golf Club, Ayrshire, Scotland. It was the second Open Championship and the first open to amateurs as well as professionals. Ten professionals and eight amateurs contested the event, with Tom Morris, Sr. winning the championship by 4 shots from Willie Park, Sr.

As in 1860 the contest was held over three rounds of the twelve-hole links course. There was no prize money, the winner receiving the Challenge Belt for the next year. Whereas the 1860 event was only open to professionals, from 1861 it was "open to all members of established golf clubs and professionals".

Following the success of the first event there was a large entry of 18. The Dunn brothers travelled from London for the event while a number of gentlemen entered. The professionals played in five pairs.

Park led by two at the start of the final round. However, at the 2nd hole Park attempted to "cross the Alps" in two but he landed in a hazard and lost three strokes, who later played the same hole more conservatively. Morris increased his lead to two at the 4th hole but by the 6th they were level. Morris picked up shots on Park at the 8th, 9th and 10th holes to go three ahead and further increased the lead to four when he holed the short 11th in two strokes. Park had finished on 167 but at the last Morris's tee shot landed in some long grass at the edge of a pool of water. Rather than take a penalty drop he elected to play the ball and kept his four shot lead.

== Final leaderboard ==
Place	Player	Score
1	(Scotland) Tom Morris, Sr.	54-56-53=163
2	(Scotland) Willie Park, Sr.	54-54-59=167
3	(Scotland) Willie Dow	59-58-54=171
4	(Scotland) Davie Park	58-57-57=172
5	(Scotland) Robert Andrew	58-61-56=175
6	(Scotland) Peter McEwan, Sr.	56-60-62=178
7	(Scotland) Willie Dunn, Sr.	61-59-60=180
8	(Scotland) James Ogilvie Fairlie (a)	184
9	(England) George Daniel Brown	60-65-60=185
10	(Scotland) Robert Chambers, Jr. (a)	187

Individual round scores are only known for the professionals.
