= Robert Andrew (golfer) =

British golfer

Personal information
- Born: c. 1841

Career
- Sport: Golf
- Status: Professional

Best results in major championships
- Masters Tournament: DNP
- PGA Championship: DNP
- U.S. Open: DNP
- The Open Championship: 3rd: 1864, 1866, 1868

Robert Andrew (born c. 1841) was a professional golfer from Scotland. He had seven top-10 finishes in The Open Championship.

== Golf career ==
=== 1860 Open Championship ===
The 1860 Open Championship was a golf competition held at Prestwick Golf Club, in Ayrshire. It is now regarded as the first Open Championship. Eight golfers contested the event, with Willie Park, Sr. winning the championship by two shots from Tom Morris, Sr. Andrew scored 191 and finished in fourth place 17 strokes behind the winner.

=== 1864 Open Championship ===
The 1864 Open Championship was the fifth Open Championship and was held on 16 September at Prestwick Golf Club. Tom Morris, Sr. won the championship for the third time, by two shots from Andrew Strath. There were sixteen competitors. Andrew scored rounds of 57-58-60=175 and won £3.

=== 1866 Open Championship ===
The 1866 Open Championship was the seventh Open Championship and was held on 13 September at Prestwick Golf Club. Willie Park, Sr. won the championship for the third time, by two shots from his brother Davie Park. There were 16 competitors. Andrew turned in cards of 58-59-59=176 and finished in third place, winning £2.

==== Details of play ====
Playing in a strong wind, Willie Park was in the first group out and set the pace with a score of 54. Defending champion Andrew Strath and Davie Park were four behind, scoring 58. Willie Park extended his lead to five strokes after the second round. Despite a final round of 59 Willie Park set a useful target of 169. Davie Park's final round of 56 gave him a total of 171 and second place. Andrew was third, a further five strokes behind, posting rounds of 58-59-59=176 and won £2.

== Results in major championships ==
Tournament	1860	1861	1862	1863	1864	1865	1866	1867	1868
The Open Championship	4	5		6	3	WD	3	7	3

Note: Andrew played only in The Open Championship.

Top 10
Did not play

WD = withdrew

== Death and legacy ==
Andrew's date of death is unknown. Andrew is best known for having seven top-10 finishes in The Open Championship.
