= List of men's major championships winning golfers =

The men's major golf championships, also known simply as the majors, are the four most prestigious events in professional golf. The competitions are the Masters Tournament, the PGA Championship, the U.S. Open, and The Open Championship, contested annually.

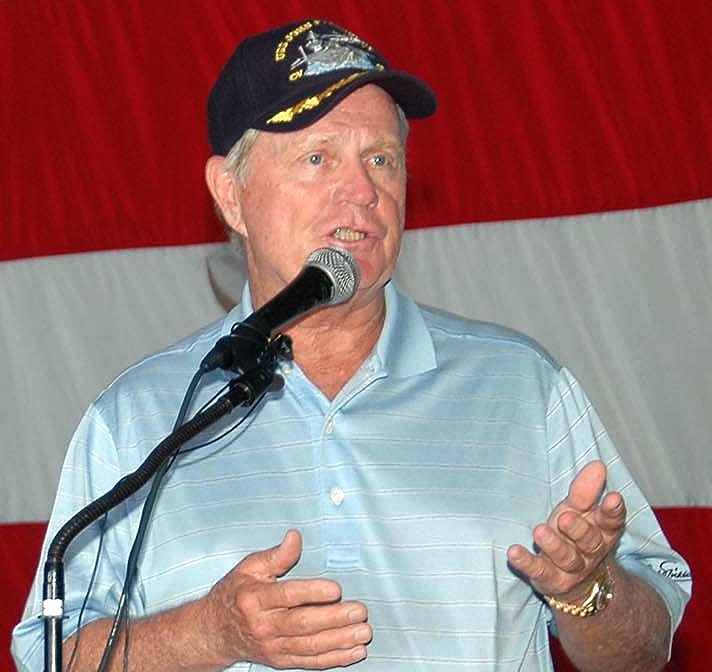
Jack Nicklaus won 18 men's major golf championships, more than any other man.

Jack Nicklaus has won the most majors, achieving 18 victories during his career. Second on the list is Tiger Woods, who has won 15 majors to date; his most recent major victory was at the 2019 Masters. Walter Hagen is third with 11 majors; he and Nicklaus have both won the most PGA Championships with five. Nicklaus also holds the record for the most victories in the Masters, winning the tournament six times. Additionally, Nicklaus shares the record for the most U.S. Open victories with Willie Anderson, Bobby Jones and Ben Hogan, each winning four times. Harry Vardon holds the record for the most Open Championship victories, winning six times during his career. Six men: Nicklaus, Woods, Hogan, Gary Player, Rory McIlroy and Gene Sarazen are the only golfers to have won all four of the majors during their career, thus achieving the career grand slam. Nicklaus and Woods are the only players to have won multiple career grand slams, winning each major more than once. Although the U.S. Amateur and The Amateur Championship were once considered to be majors, they are no longer recognized as such, and victories in these competitions are not included in the list.

As of the 2026 Open Championship, 478 majors have been played. A total of 236 different men have won majors and, of these, 90 have won at least two.

== By golfer ==
Key
| * | Completed a career Grand Slam |

Men's major championship winning golfers
| Rank | Country | Golfer | Winning span | Masters | U.S. Open | The Open | PGA | Total |
|---|---|---|---|---|---|---|---|---|
| 1 | United States | Jack Nicklaus* | 1962–1986 | 6 | 4 | 3 | 5 | 18 |
| 2 | United States | Tiger Woods* | 1997–2019 | 5 | 3 | 3 | 4 | 15 |
| 3 | United States | Walter Hagen | 1914–1929 | 0 | 2 | 4 | 5 | 11 |
| 4 | United States | Ben Hogan* | 1946–1953 | 2 | 4 | 1 | 2 | 9 |
| 4 | South Africa | Gary Player* | 1959–1978 | 3 | 1 | 3 | 2 | 9 |
| 6 | United States | Tom Watson | 1975–1983 | 2 | 1 | 5 | 0 | 8 |
| 7 | Jersey | Harry Vardon | 1896–1914 | 0 | 1 | 6 | 0 | 7 |
| 7 | United States | Bobby Jones | 1923–1930 | 0 | 4 | 3 | 0 | 7 |
| 7 | United States | Gene Sarazen* | 1922–1935 | 1 | 2 | 1 | 3 | 7 |
| 7 | United States | Sam Snead | 1942–1954 | 3 | 0 | 1 | 3 | 7 |
| 7 | United States | Arnold Palmer | 1958–1964 | 4 | 1 | 2 | 0 | 7 |
| 12 | United States | Lee Trevino | 1968–1984 | 0 | 2 | 2 | 2 | 6 |
| 12 | England | Nick Faldo | 1987–1996 | 3 | 0 | 3 | 0 | 6 |
| 12 | United States | Phil Mickelson | 2004–2021 | 3 | 0 | 1 | 2 | 6 |
| 12 | Northern Ireland | Rory McIlroy* | 2011–2026 | 2 | 1 | 1 | 2 | 6 |
| 16 | Scotland | James Braid | 1901–1910 | 0 | 0 | 5 | 0 | 5 |
| 16 | England | John Henry Taylor | 1894–1913 | 0 | 0 | 5 | 0 | 5 |
| 16 | United States | Byron Nelson | 1937–1945 | 2 | 1 | 0 | 2 | 5 |
| 16 | Australia | Peter Thomson | 1954–1965 | 0 | 0 | 5 | 0 | 5 |
| 16 | Spain | Seve Ballesteros | 1979–1988 | 2 | 0 | 3 | 0 | 5 |
| 16 | United States | Brooks Koepka | 2017–2023 | 0 | 2 | 0 | 3 | 5 |
| 22 | Scotland | Tom Morris Sr. | 1861–1867 | 0 | 0 | 4 | 0 | 4 |
| 22 | Scotland | Tom Morris Jr. | 1868–1872 | 0 | 0 | 4 | 0 | 4 |
| 22 | Scotland | Willie Park Sr. | 1860–1875 | 0 | 0 | 4 | 0 | 4 |
| 22 | Scotland | Willie Anderson | 1901–1905 | 0 | 4 | 0 | 0 | 4 |
| 22 | England | Jim Barnes | 1916–1925 | 0 | 1 | 1 | 2 | 4 |
| 22 | South Africa | Bobby Locke | 1949–1957 | 0 | 0 | 4 | 0 | 4 |
| 22 | United States | Raymond Floyd | 1969–1986 | 1 | 1 | 0 | 2 | 4 |
| 22 | South Africa | Ernie Els | 1994–2012 | 0 | 2 | 2 | 0 | 4 |
| 22 | United States | Scottie Scheffler | 2022–2025 | 2 | 0 | 1 | 1 | 4 |
| 31 | Scotland | James Anderson | 1877–1879 | 0 | 0 | 3 | 0 | 3 |
| 31 | Scotland | Bob Ferguson | 1880–1882 | 0 | 0 | 3 | 0 | 3 |
| 31 | Scotland | Tommy Armour | 1927–1931 | 0 | 1 | 1 | 1 | 3 |
| 31 | United States | Denny Shute | 1933–1937 | 0 | 0 | 1 | 2 | 3 |
| 31 | United States | Ralph Guldahl | 1937–1939 | 1 | 2 | 0 | 0 | 3 |
| 31 | England | Henry Cotton | 1934–1948 | 0 | 0 | 3 | 0 | 3 |
| 31 | United States | Jimmy Demaret | 1940–1950 | 3 | 0 | 0 | 0 | 3 |
| 31 | United States | Cary Middlecoff | 1949–1956 | 1 | 2 | 0 | 0 | 3 |
| 31 | United States | Julius Boros | 1952–1968 | 0 | 2 | 0 | 1 | 3 |
| 31 | United States | Billy Casper | 1959–1970 | 1 | 2 | 0 | 0 | 3 |
| 31 | United States | Larry Nelson | 1981–1987 | 0 | 1 | 0 | 2 | 3 |
| 31 | United States | Hale Irwin | 1974–1990 | 0 | 3 | 0 | 0 | 3 |
| 31 | Zimbabwe | Nick Price | 1992–1994 | 0 | 0 | 1 | 2 | 3 |
| 31 | United States | Payne Stewart | 1989–1999 | 0 | 2 | 0 | 1 | 3 |
| 31 | Fiji | Vijay Singh | 1998–2004 | 1 | 0 | 0 | 2 | 3 |
| 31 | Ireland | Pádraig Harrington | 2007–2008 | 0 | 0 | 2 | 1 | 3 |
| 31 | United States | Jordan Spieth | 2015–2017 | 1 | 1 | 1 | 0 | 3 |
| 48 | Scotland | Bob Martin | 1876–1885 | 0 | 0 | 2 | 0 | 2 |
| 48 | Scotland | Willie Park Jr. | 1887–1889 | 0 | 0 | 2 | 0 | 2 |
| 48 | England | Harold Hilton | 1892–1897 | 0 | 0 | 2 | 0 | 2 |
| 48 | Scotland | Alex Smith | 1906–1910 | 0 | 2 | 0 | 0 | 2 |
| 48 | United States | John McDermott | 1911–1912 | 0 | 2 | 0 | 0 | 2 |
| 48 | Jersey | Ted Ray | 1912–1920 | 0 | 1 | 1 | 0 | 2 |
| 48 | Scotland | Jock Hutchison | 1920–1921 | 0 | 0 | 1 | 1 | 2 |
| 48 | United States | Leo Diegel | 1928–1929 | 0 | 0 | 0 | 2 | 2 |
| 48 | United States | Olin Dutra | 1932–1934 | 0 | 1 | 0 | 1 | 2 |
| 48 | United States | Horton Smith | 1934–1936 | 2 | 0 | 0 | 0 | 2 |
| 48 | United States | Paul Runyan | 1934–1938 | 0 | 0 | 0 | 2 | 2 |
| 48 | United States | Henry Picard | 1938–1939 | 1 | 0 | 0 | 1 | 2 |
| 48 | United States | Craig Wood | 1941 | 1 | 1 | 0 | 0 | 2 |
| 48 | United States | Jack Burke Jr. | 1956 | 1 | 0 | 0 | 1 | 2 |
| 48 | United States | Doug Ford | 1955–1957 | 1 | 0 | 0 | 1 | 2 |
| 48 | England | Tony Jacklin | 1969–1970 | 0 | 1 | 1 | 0 | 2 |
| 48 | United States | Dave Stockton | 1970–1976 | 0 | 0 | 0 | 2 | 2 |
| 48 | United States | Johnny Miller | 1973–1976 | 0 | 1 | 1 | 0 | 2 |
| 48 | Australia | David Graham | 1979–1981 | 0 | 1 | 0 | 1 | 2 |
| 48 | United States | Fuzzy Zoeller | 1979–1984 | 1 | 1 | 0 | 0 | 2 |
| 48 | United States | Hubert Green | 1977–1985 | 0 | 1 | 0 | 1 | 2 |
| 48 | United States | Andy North | 1978–1985 | 0 | 2 | 0 | 0 | 2 |
| 48 | Scotland | Sandy Lyle | 1985–1988 | 1 | 0 | 1 | 0 | 2 |
| 48 | United States | Curtis Strange | 1988–1989 | 0 | 2 | 0 | 0 | 2 |
| 48 | Germany | Bernhard Langer | 1985–1993 | 2 | 0 | 0 | 0 | 2 |
| 48 | Australia | Greg Norman | 1986–1993 | 0 | 0 | 2 | 0 | 2 |
| 48 | United States | Ben Crenshaw | 1984–1995 | 2 | 0 | 0 | 0 | 2 |
| 48 | United States | John Daly | 1991–1995 | 0 | 0 | 1 | 1 | 2 |
| 48 | United States | Lee Janzen | 1993–1998 | 0 | 2 | 0 | 0 | 2 |
| 48 | United States | Mark O'Meara | 1998 | 1 | 0 | 1 | 0 | 2 |
| 48 | Spain | José María Olazábal | 1994–1999 | 2 | 0 | 0 | 0 | 2 |
| 48 | South Africa | Retief Goosen | 2001–2004 | 0 | 2 | 0 | 0 | 2 |
| 48 | Argentina | Ángel Cabrera | 2007–2009 | 1 | 1 | 0 | 0 | 2 |
| 48 | United States | Bubba Watson | 2012–2014 | 2 | 0 | 0 | 0 | 2 |
| 48 | Germany | Martin Kaymer | 2010–2014 | 0 | 1 | 0 | 1 | 2 |
| 48 | United States | Zach Johnson | 2007–2015 | 1 | 0 | 1 | 0 | 2 |
| 48 | United States | Dustin Johnson | 2016–2020 | 1 | 1 | 0 | 0 | 2 |
| 48 | United States | Collin Morikawa | 2020–2021 | 0 | 0 | 1 | 1 | 2 |
| 48 | United States | Justin Thomas | 2017–2022 | 0 | 0 | 0 | 2 | 2 |
| 48 | Spain | Jon Rahm | 2021–2023 | 1 | 1 | 0 | 0 | 2 |
| 48 | United States | Bryson DeChambeau | 2020–2024 | 0 | 2 | 0 | 0 | 2 |
| 48 | United States | Wyndham Clark | 2023–2026 | 0 | 2 | 0 | 0 | 2 |
| 48 | United States | Xander Schauffele | 2024 | 0 | 0 | 1 | 1 | 2 |
| 91 | Scotland | Andrew Strath | 1865 | 0 | 0 | 1 | 0 | 1 |
| 91 | Scotland | Tom Kidd | 1873 | 0 | 0 | 1 | 0 | 1 |
| 91 | Scotland | Mungo Park | 1874 | 0 | 0 | 1 | 0 | 1 |
| 91 | Scotland | Willie Fernie | 1883 | 0 | 0 | 1 | 0 | 1 |
| 91 | Scotland | Jack Simpson | 1884 | 0 | 0 | 1 | 0 | 1 |
| 91 | Scotland | David Brown | 1886 | 0 | 0 | 1 | 0 | 1 |
| 91 | Scotland | Jack Burns | 1888 | 0 | 0 | 1 | 0 | 1 |
| 91 | England | John Ball | 1890 | 0 | 0 | 1 | 0 | 1 |
| 91 | Scotland | Hugh Kirkaldy | 1891 | 0 | 0 | 1 | 0 | 1 |
| 91 | Scotland | William Auchterlonie | 1893 | 0 | 0 | 1 | 0 | 1 |
| 91 | England | Horace Rawlins | 1895 | 0 | 1 | 0 | 0 | 1 |
| 91 | Scotland | James Foulis | 1896 | 0 | 1 | 0 | 0 | 1 |
| 91 | England | Joe Lloyd | 1897 | 0 | 1 | 0 | 0 | 1 |
| 91 | Scotland | Fred Herd | 1898 | 0 | 1 | 0 | 0 | 1 |
| 91 | Scotland | Willie Smith | 1899 | 0 | 1 | 0 | 0 | 1 |
| 91 | Scotland | Laurie Auchterlonie | 1902 | 0 | 1 | 0 | 0 | 1 |
| 91 | Scotland | Sandy Herd | 1902 | 0 | 0 | 1 | 0 | 1 |
| 91 | Scotland | Jack White | 1904 | 0 | 0 | 1 | 0 | 1 |
| 91 | Scotland | Alec Ross | 1907 | 0 | 1 | 0 | 0 | 1 |
| 91 | France | Arnaud Massy | 1907 | 0 | 0 | 1 | 0 | 1 |
| 91 | Scotland | Fred McLeod | 1908 | 0 | 1 | 0 | 0 | 1 |
| 91 | England | George Sargent | 1909 | 0 | 1 | 0 | 0 | 1 |
| 91 | United States | Francis Ouimet | 1913 | 0 | 1 | 0 | 0 | 1 |
| 91 | United States | Jerome Travers | 1915 | 0 | 1 | 0 | 0 | 1 |
| 91 | United States | Chick Evans | 1916 | 0 | 1 | 0 | 0 | 1 |
| 91 | Scotland | George Duncan | 1920 | 0 | 0 | 1 | 0 | 1 |
| 91 | England | Arthur Havers | 1923 | 0 | 0 | 1 | 0 | 1 |
| 91 | England | Cyril Walker | 1924 | 0 | 1 | 0 | 0 | 1 |
| 91 | Scotland | Willie Macfarlane | 1925 | 0 | 1 | 0 | 0 | 1 |
| 91 | United States | Johnny Farrell | 1928 | 0 | 1 | 0 | 0 | 1 |
| 91 | United States | Billy Burke | 1931 | 0 | 1 | 0 | 0 | 1 |
| 91 | United States | Tom Creavy | 1931 | 0 | 0 | 0 | 1 | 1 |
| 91 | United States | Johnny Goodman | 1933 | 0 | 1 | 0 | 0 | 1 |
| 91 | United States | Sam Parks Jr. | 1935 | 0 | 1 | 0 | 0 | 1 |
| 91 | England | Alf Perry | 1935 | 0 | 0 | 1 | 0 | 1 |
| 91 | United States | Johnny Revolta | 1935 | 0 | 0 | 0 | 1 | 1 |
| 91 | United States | Tony Manero | 1936 | 0 | 1 | 0 | 0 | 1 |
| 91 | England | Alf Padgham | 1936 | 0 | 0 | 1 | 0 | 1 |
| 91 | England | Reg Whitcombe | 1938 | 0 | 0 | 1 | 0 | 1 |
| 91 | England | Dick Burton | 1939 | 0 | 0 | 1 | 0 | 1 |
| 91 | United States | Lawson Little | 1940 | 0 | 1 | 0 | 0 | 1 |
| 91 | United States | Vic Ghezzi | 1941 | 0 | 0 | 0 | 1 | 1 |
| 91 | United States | Bob Hamilton | 1944 | 0 | 0 | 0 | 1 | 1 |
| 91 | United States | Herman Keiser | 1946 | 1 | 0 | 0 | 0 | 1 |
| 91 | United States | Lloyd Mangrum | 1946 | 0 | 1 | 0 | 0 | 1 |
| 91 | United States | Lew Worsham | 1947 | 0 | 1 | 0 | 0 | 1 |
| 91 | Northern Ireland | Fred Daly | 1947 | 0 | 0 | 1 | 0 | 1 |
| 91 | Australia | Jim Ferrier | 1947 | 0 | 0 | 0 | 1 | 1 |
| 91 | United States | Claude Harmon | 1948 | 1 | 0 | 0 | 0 | 1 |
| 91 | United States | Chandler Harper | 1950 | 0 | 0 | 0 | 1 | 1 |
| 91 | England | Max Faulkner | 1951 | 0 | 0 | 1 | 0 | 1 |
| 91 | United States | Jim Turnesa | 1952 | 0 | 0 | 0 | 1 | 1 |
| 91 | United States | Walter Burkemo | 1953 | 0 | 0 | 0 | 1 | 1 |
| 91 | United States | Ed Furgol | 1954 | 0 | 1 | 0 | 0 | 1 |
| 91 | United States | Chick Harbert | 1954 | 0 | 0 | 0 | 1 | 1 |
| 91 | United States | Jack Fleck | 1955 | 0 | 1 | 0 | 0 | 1 |
| 91 | United States | Dick Mayer | 1957 | 0 | 1 | 0 | 0 | 1 |
| 91 | United States | Lionel Hebert | 1957 | 0 | 0 | 0 | 1 | 1 |
| 91 | United States | Tommy Bolt | 1958 | 0 | 1 | 0 | 0 | 1 |
| 91 | United States | Dow Finsterwald | 1958 | 0 | 0 | 0 | 1 | 1 |
| 91 | United States | Art Wall Jr. | 1959 | 1 | 0 | 0 | 0 | 1 |
| 91 | United States | Bob Rosburg | 1959 | 0 | 0 | 0 | 1 | 1 |
| 91 | Australia | Kel Nagle | 1960 | 0 | 0 | 1 | 0 | 1 |
| 91 | United States | Jay Hebert | 1960 | 0 | 0 | 0 | 1 | 1 |
| 91 | United States | Gene Littler | 1961 | 0 | 1 | 0 | 0 | 1 |
| 91 | United States | Jerry Barber | 1961 | 0 | 0 | 0 | 1 | 1 |
| 91 | New Zealand | Bob Charles | 1963 | 0 | 0 | 1 | 0 | 1 |
| 91 | United States | Ken Venturi | 1964 | 0 | 1 | 0 | 0 | 1 |
| 91 | United States | Tony Lema | 1964 | 0 | 0 | 1 | 0 | 1 |
| 91 | United States | Bobby Nichols | 1964 | 0 | 0 | 0 | 1 | 1 |
| 91 | United States | Dave Marr | 1965 | 0 | 0 | 0 | 1 | 1 |
| 91 | United States | Al Geiberger | 1966 | 0 | 0 | 0 | 1 | 1 |
| 91 | United States | Gay Brewer | 1967 | 1 | 0 | 0 | 0 | 1 |
| 91 | Argentina | Roberto De Vicenzo | 1967 | 0 | 0 | 1 | 0 | 1 |
| 91 | United States | Don January | 1967 | 0 | 0 | 0 | 1 | 1 |
| 91 | United States | Bob Goalby | 1968 | 1 | 0 | 0 | 0 | 1 |
| 91 | United States | George Archer | 1969 | 1 | 0 | 0 | 0 | 1 |
| 91 | United States | Orville Moody | 1969 | 0 | 1 | 0 | 0 | 1 |
| 91 | United States | Charles Coody | 1971 | 1 | 0 | 0 | 0 | 1 |
| 91 | United States | Tommy Aaron | 1973 | 1 | 0 | 0 | 0 | 1 |
| 91 | United States | Tom Weiskopf | 1973 | 0 | 0 | 1 | 0 | 1 |
| 91 | United States | Lou Graham | 1975 | 0 | 1 | 0 | 0 | 1 |
| 91 | United States | Jerry Pate | 1976 | 0 | 1 | 0 | 0 | 1 |
| 91 | United States | Lanny Wadkins | 1977 | 0 | 0 | 0 | 1 | 1 |
| 91 | United States | John Mahaffey | 1978 | 0 | 0 | 0 | 1 | 1 |
| 91 | United States | Bill Rogers | 1981 | 0 | 0 | 1 | 0 | 1 |
| 91 | United States | Craig Stadler | 1982 | 1 | 0 | 0 | 0 | 1 |
| 91 | United States | Hal Sutton | 1983 | 0 | 0 | 0 | 1 | 1 |
| 91 | United States | Bob Tway | 1986 | 0 | 0 | 0 | 1 | 1 |
| 91 | United States | Larry Mize | 1987 | 1 | 0 | 0 | 0 | 1 |
| 91 | United States | Scott Simpson | 1987 | 0 | 1 | 0 | 0 | 1 |
| 91 | United States | Jeff Sluman | 1988 | 0 | 0 | 0 | 1 | 1 |
| 91 | United States | Mark Calcavecchia | 1989 | 0 | 0 | 1 | 0 | 1 |
| 91 | Australia | Wayne Grady | 1990 | 0 | 0 | 0 | 1 | 1 |
| 91 | Wales | Ian Woosnam | 1991 | 1 | 0 | 0 | 0 | 1 |
| 91 | Australia | Ian Baker-Finch | 1991 | 0 | 0 | 1 | 0 | 1 |
| 91 | United States | Fred Couples | 1992 | 1 | 0 | 0 | 0 | 1 |
| 91 | United States | Tom Kite | 1992 | 0 | 1 | 0 | 0 | 1 |
| 91 | United States | Paul Azinger | 1993 | 0 | 0 | 0 | 1 | 1 |
| 91 | United States | Corey Pavin | 1995 | 0 | 1 | 0 | 0 | 1 |
| 91 | Australia | Steve Elkington | 1995 | 0 | 0 | 0 | 1 | 1 |
| 91 | United States | Steve Jones | 1996 | 0 | 1 | 0 | 0 | 1 |
| 91 | United States | Tom Lehman | 1996 | 0 | 0 | 1 | 0 | 1 |
| 91 | United States | Mark Brooks | 1996 | 0 | 0 | 0 | 1 | 1 |
| 91 | United States | Justin Leonard | 1997 | 0 | 0 | 1 | 0 | 1 |
| 91 | United States | Davis Love III | 1997 | 0 | 0 | 0 | 1 | 1 |
| 91 | Scotland | Paul Lawrie | 1999 | 0 | 0 | 1 | 0 | 1 |
| 91 | United States | David Duval | 2001 | 0 | 0 | 1 | 0 | 1 |
| 91 | United States | David Toms | 2001 | 0 | 0 | 0 | 1 | 1 |
| 91 | United States | Rich Beem | 2002 | 0 | 0 | 0 | 1 | 1 |
| 91 | Canada | Mike Weir | 2003 | 1 | 0 | 0 | 0 | 1 |
| 91 | United States | Jim Furyk | 2003 | 0 | 1 | 0 | 0 | 1 |
| 91 | United States | Ben Curtis | 2003 | 0 | 0 | 1 | 0 | 1 |
| 91 | United States | Shaun Micheel | 2003 | 0 | 0 | 0 | 1 | 1 |
| 91 | United States | Todd Hamilton | 2004 | 0 | 0 | 1 | 0 | 1 |
| 91 | New Zealand | Michael Campbell | 2005 | 0 | 1 | 0 | 0 | 1 |
| 91 | Australia | Geoff Ogilvy | 2006 | 0 | 1 | 0 | 0 | 1 |
| 91 | South Africa | Trevor Immelman | 2008 | 1 | 0 | 0 | 0 | 1 |
| 91 | United States | Lucas Glover | 2009 | 0 | 1 | 0 | 0 | 1 |
| 91 | United States | Stewart Cink | 2009 | 0 | 0 | 1 | 0 | 1 |
| 91 | South Korea | Yang Yong-eun | 2009 | 0 | 0 | 0 | 1 | 1 |
| 91 | Northern Ireland | Graeme McDowell | 2010 | 0 | 1 | 0 | 0 | 1 |
| 91 | South Africa | Louis Oosthuizen | 2010 | 0 | 0 | 1 | 0 | 1 |
| 91 | South Africa | Charl Schwartzel | 2011 | 1 | 0 | 0 | 0 | 1 |
| 91 | Northern Ireland | Darren Clarke | 2011 | 0 | 0 | 1 | 0 | 1 |
| 91 | United States | Keegan Bradley | 2011 | 0 | 0 | 0 | 1 | 1 |
| 91 | United States | Webb Simpson | 2012 | 0 | 1 | 0 | 0 | 1 |
| 91 | Australia | Adam Scott | 2013 | 1 | 0 | 0 | 0 | 1 |
| 91 | England | Justin Rose | 2013 | 0 | 1 | 0 | 0 | 1 |
| 91 | United States | Jason Dufner | 2013 | 0 | 0 | 0 | 1 | 1 |
| 91 | Australia | Jason Day | 2015 | 0 | 0 | 0 | 1 | 1 |
| 91 | England | Danny Willett | 2016 | 1 | 0 | 0 | 0 | 1 |
| 91 | Sweden | Henrik Stenson | 2016 | 0 | 0 | 1 | 0 | 1 |
| 91 | United States | Jimmy Walker | 2016 | 0 | 0 | 0 | 1 | 1 |
| 91 | Spain | Sergio García | 2017 | 1 | 0 | 0 | 0 | 1 |
| 91 | United States | Patrick Reed | 2018 | 1 | 0 | 0 | 0 | 1 |
| 91 | Italy | Francesco Molinari | 2018 | 0 | 0 | 1 | 0 | 1 |
| 91 | United States | Gary Woodland | 2019 | 0 | 1 | 0 | 0 | 1 |
| 91 | Ireland | Shane Lowry | 2019 | 0 | 0 | 1 | 0 | 1 |
| 91 | Japan | Hideki Matsuyama | 2021 | 1 | 0 | 0 | 0 | 1 |
| 91 | England | Matt Fitzpatrick | 2022 | 0 | 1 | 0 | 0 | 1 |
| 91 | Australia | Cameron Smith | 2022 | 0 | 0 | 1 | 0 | 1 |
| 91 | United States | Brian Harman | 2023 | 0 | 0 | 1 | 0 | 1 |
| 91 | United States | J. J. Spaun | 2025 | 0 | 1 | 0 | 0 | 1 |
| 91 | England | Aaron Rai | 2026 | 0 | 0 | 0 | 1 | 1 |
| 91 | New Zealand | Ryan Fox | 2026 | 0 | 0 | 1 | 0 | 1 |
| Winners | Events | | | Masters | U.S. Open | The Open | PGA | Total |
| 236 | Totals | | | 90 | 126 | 154 | 108 | 478 |

== By country ==
Men's major championship winning golfers by country
| Country | Masters | U.S. Open | The Open | PGA | Total |
|---|---|---|---|---|---|
| United States | 64 | 90 | 48 | 89 | 291 |
| Scotland | 1 | 13 | 41 | 0 | 55 |
| England | 4 | 8 | 22 | 3 | 37 |
| South Africa | 5 | 5 | 10 | 2 | 22 |
| Australia | 1 | 2 | 10 | 5 | 18 |
| Spain | 6 | 1 | 3 | 0 | 10 |
| Northern Ireland | 2 | 2 | 3 | 2 | 9 |
| Jersey | 0 | 2 | 7 | 0 | 9 |
| Germany | 2 | 1 | 0 | 1 | 4 |
| Ireland | 0 | 0 | 3 | 1 | 4 |
| Zimbabwe | 0 | 0 | 1 | 2 | 3 |
| Fiji | 1 | 0 | 0 | 2 | 3 |
| Argentina | 1 | 1 | 1 | 0 | 3 |
| New Zealand | 0 | 1 | 2 | 0 | 3 |
| France | 0 | 0 | 1 | 0 | 1 |
| Wales | 1 | 0 | 0 | 0 | 1 |
| Canada | 1 | 0 | 0 | 0 | 1 |
| Japan | 1 | 0 | 0 | 0 | 1 |
| South Korea | 0 | 0 | 0 | 1 | 1 |
| Sweden | 0 | 0 | 1 | 0 | 1 |
| Italy | 0 | 0 | 1 | 0 | 1 |
| Total | 90 | 126 | 154 | 108 | 478 |

== Gallery ==
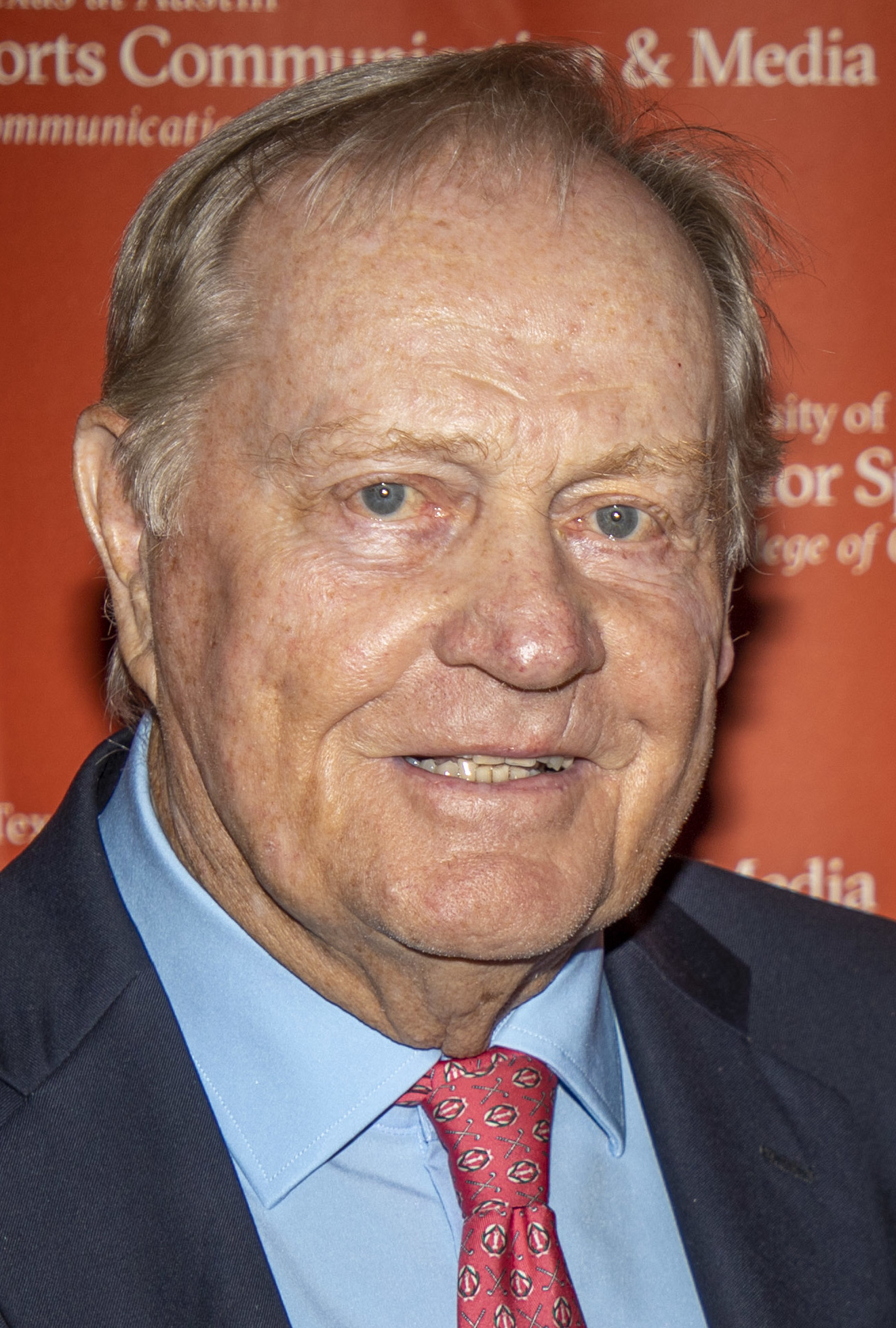
Jack Nicklaus won a record 18 majors

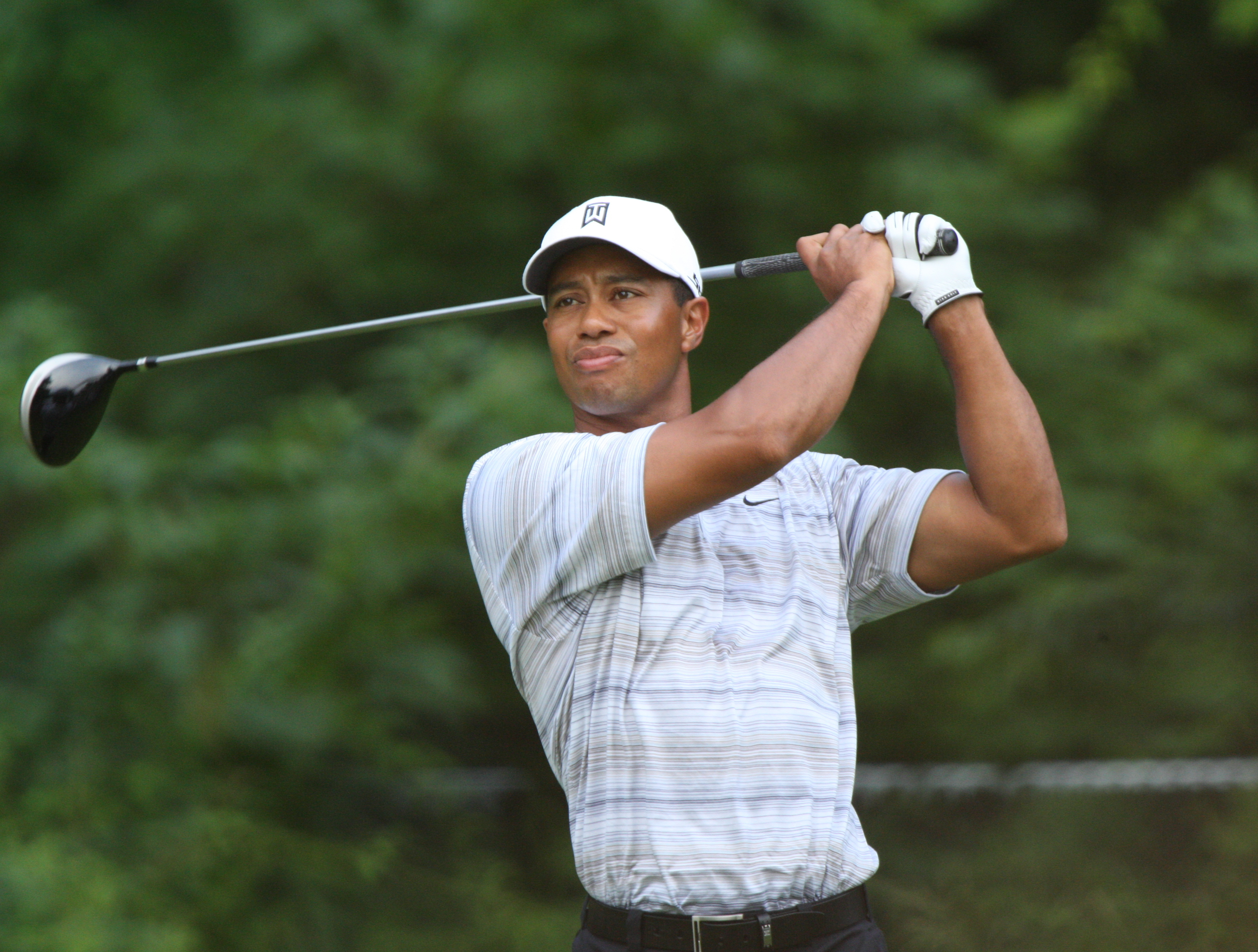
Tiger Woods has won 15 majors

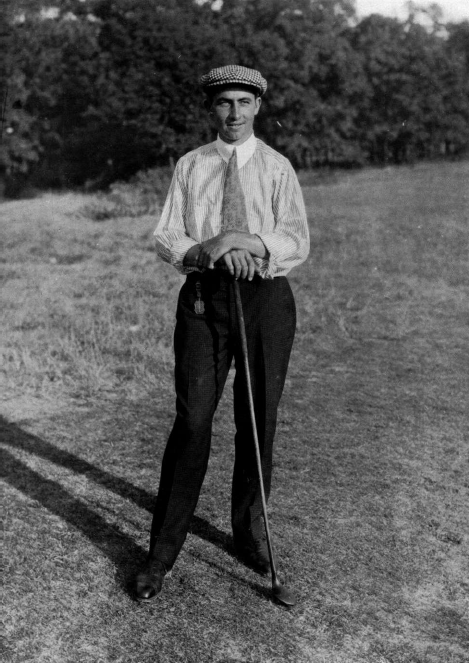
Walter Hagen won 11 majors

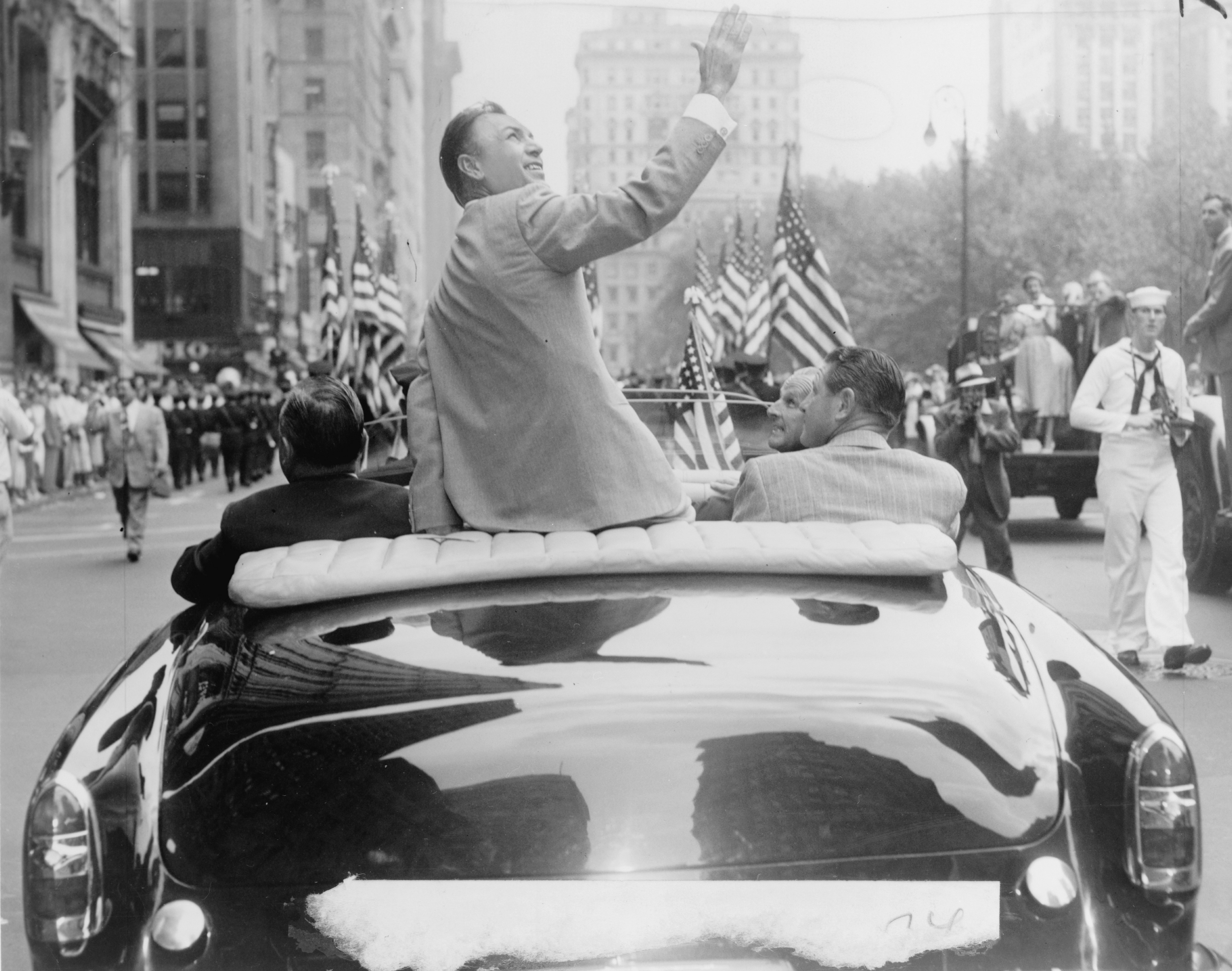
Ben Hogan won nine majors

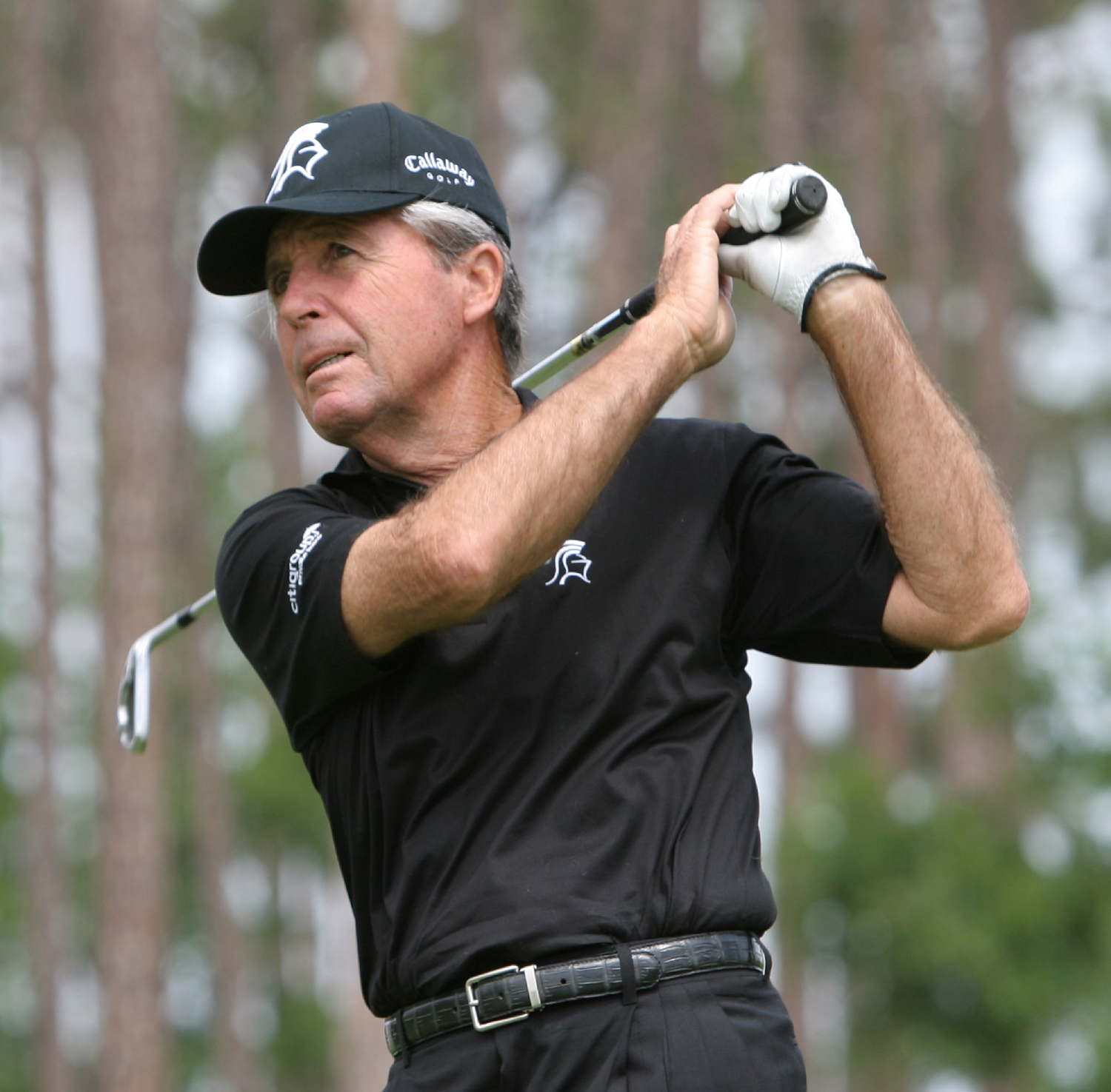
Gary Player won nine majors

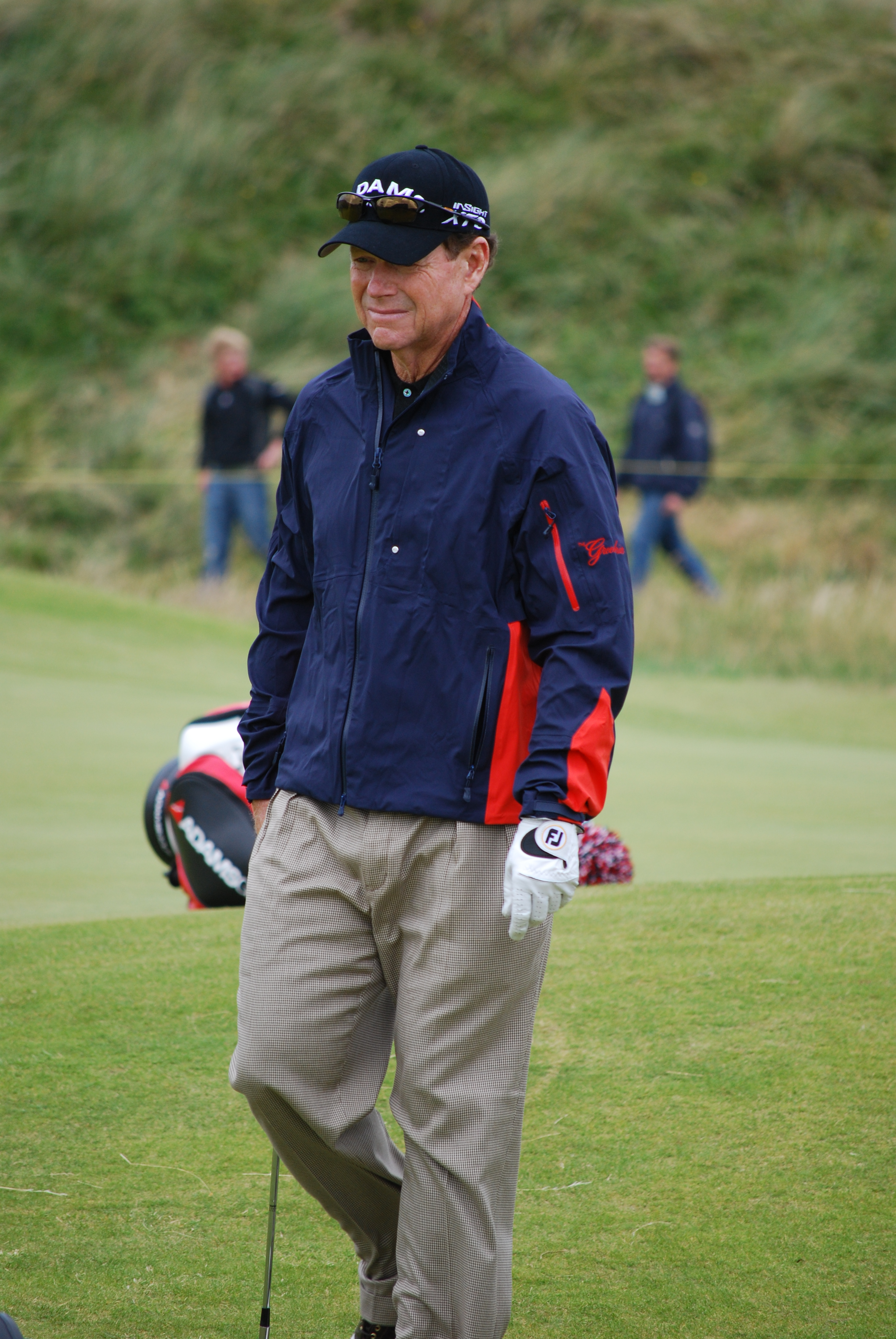
Tom Watson won eight majors

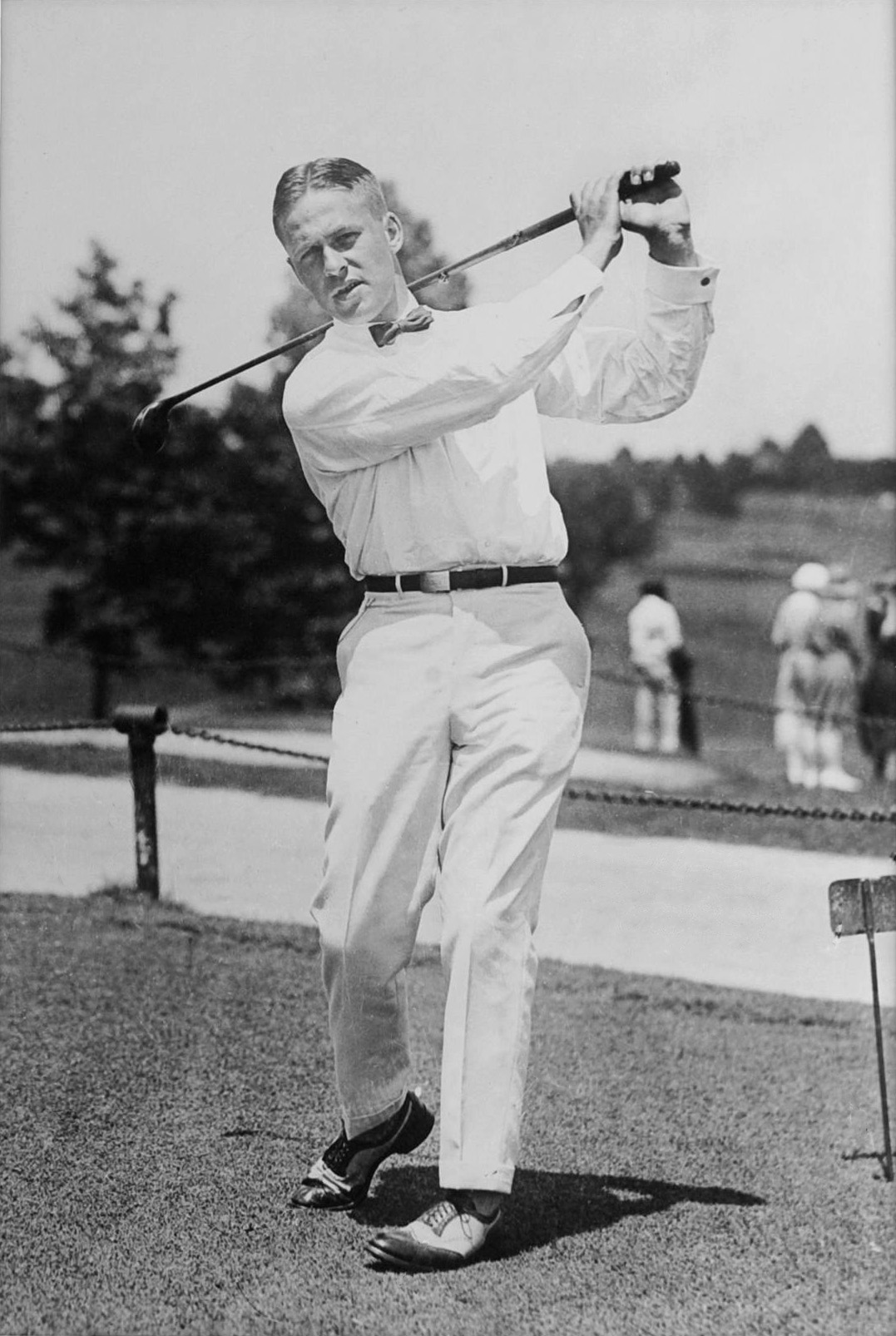
Bobby Jones won seven majors

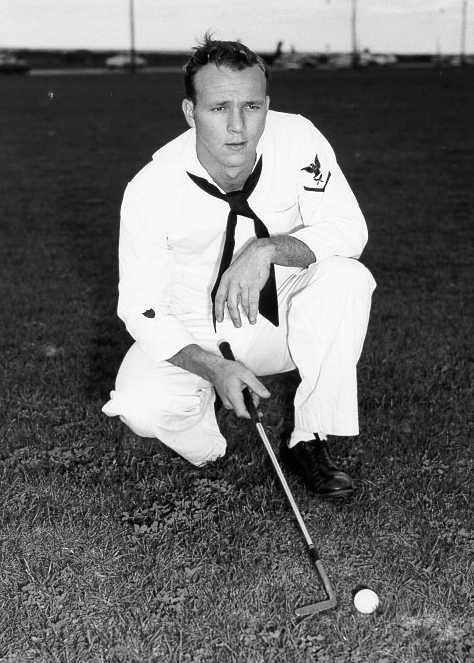
Arnold Palmer won seven majors

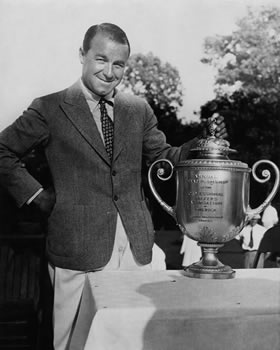
Gene Sarazen won seven majors

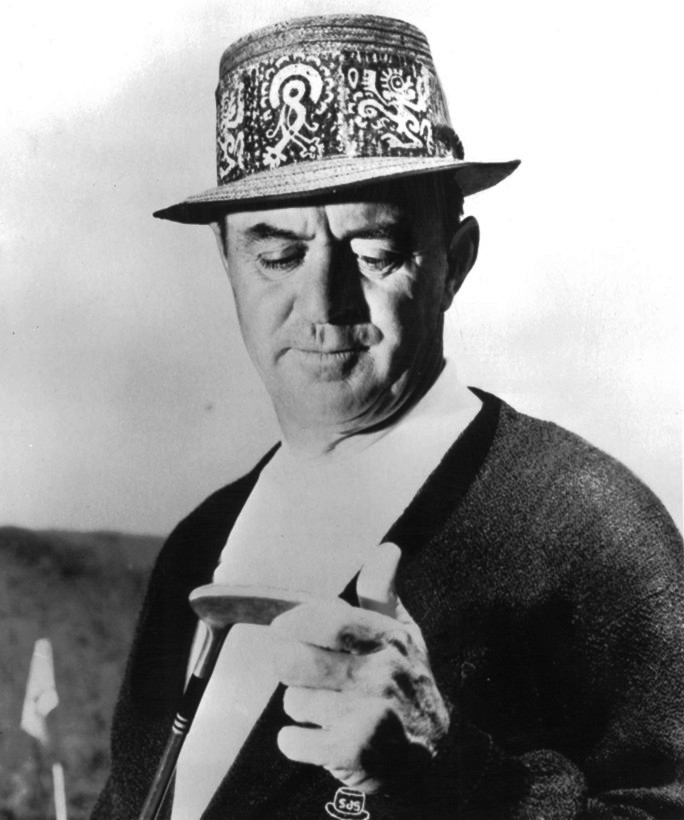
Sam Snead won seven majors

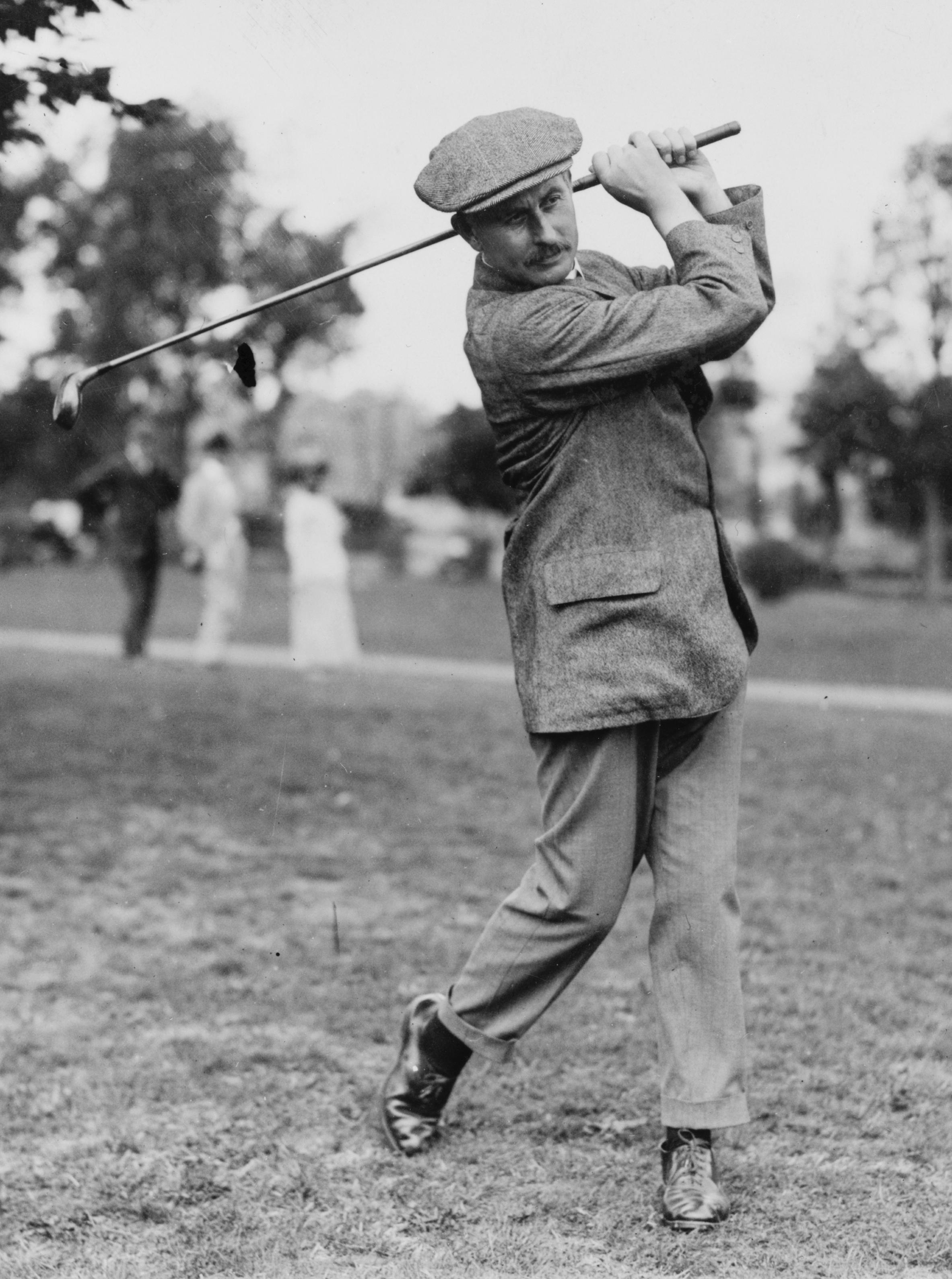
Harry Vardon won seven majors

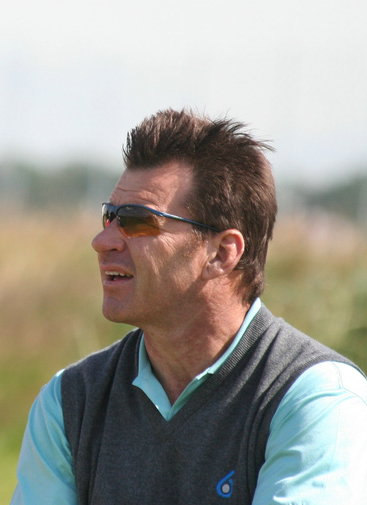
Nick Faldo won six majors

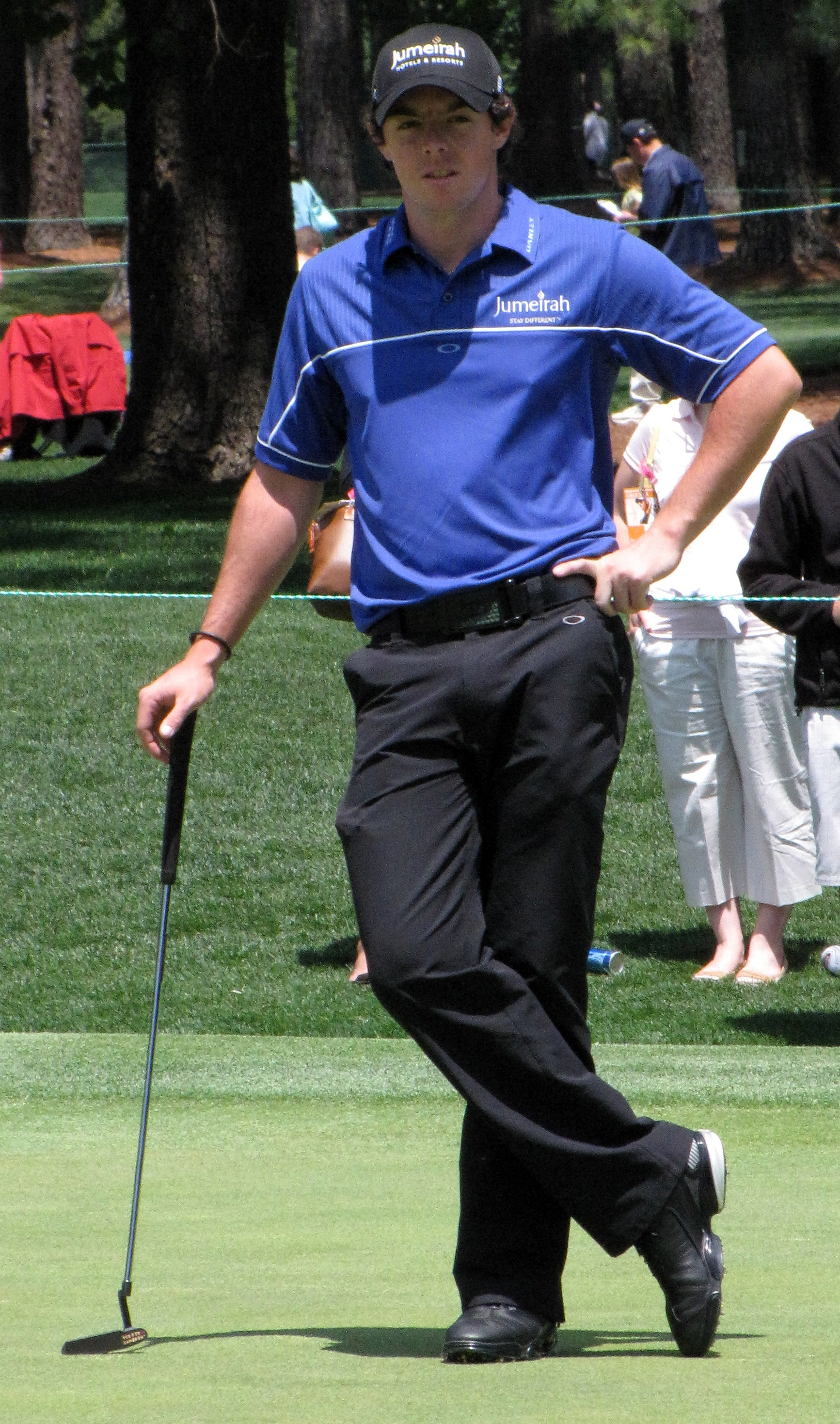
Rory McIlroy has won six majors

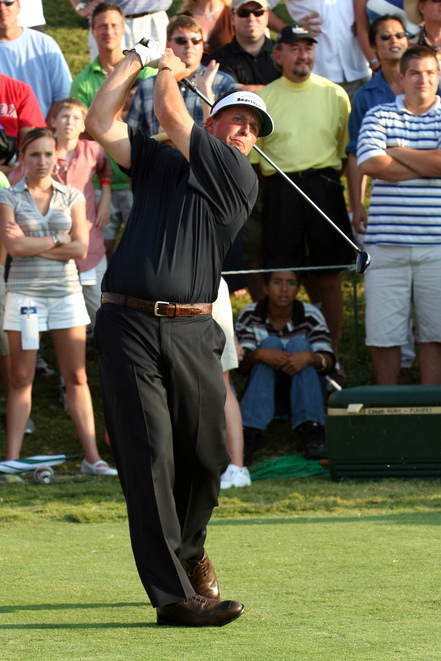
Phil Mickelson has won six majors

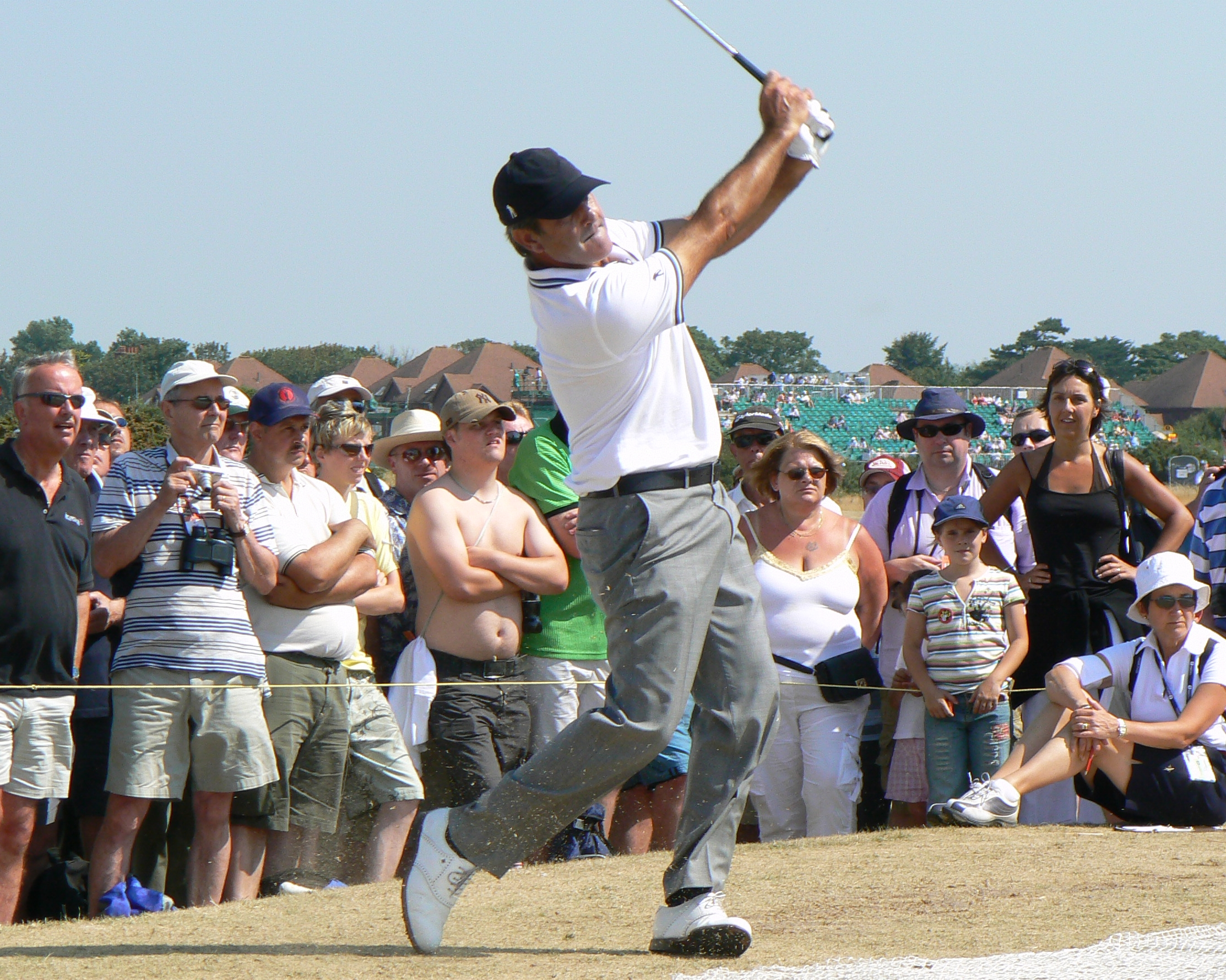
Seve Ballesteros won five majors

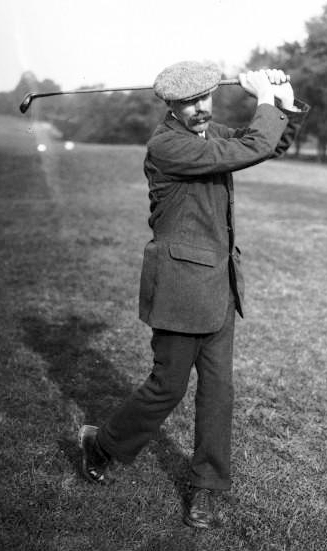
James Braid won five majors

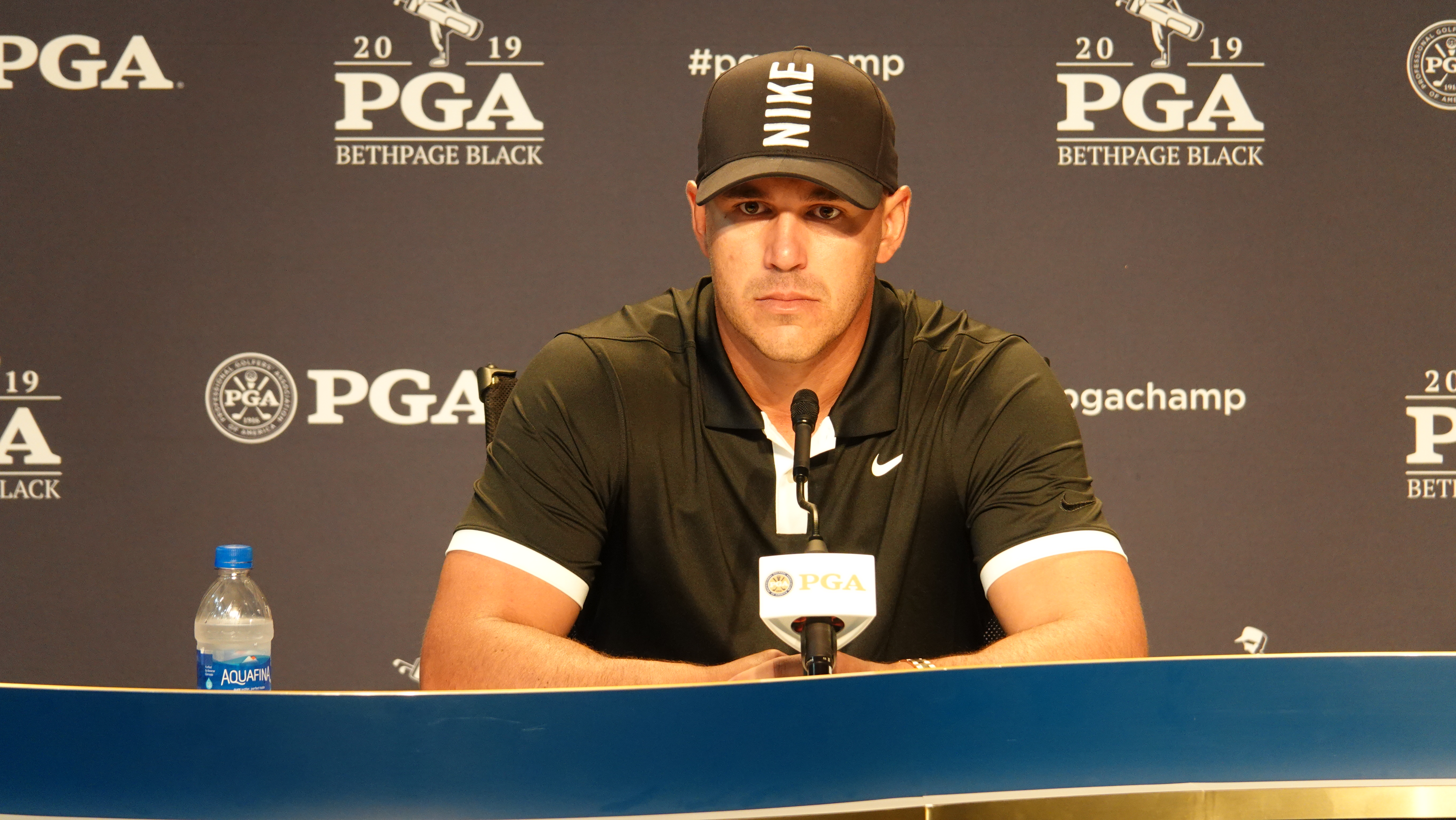
Brooks Koepka has won five majors

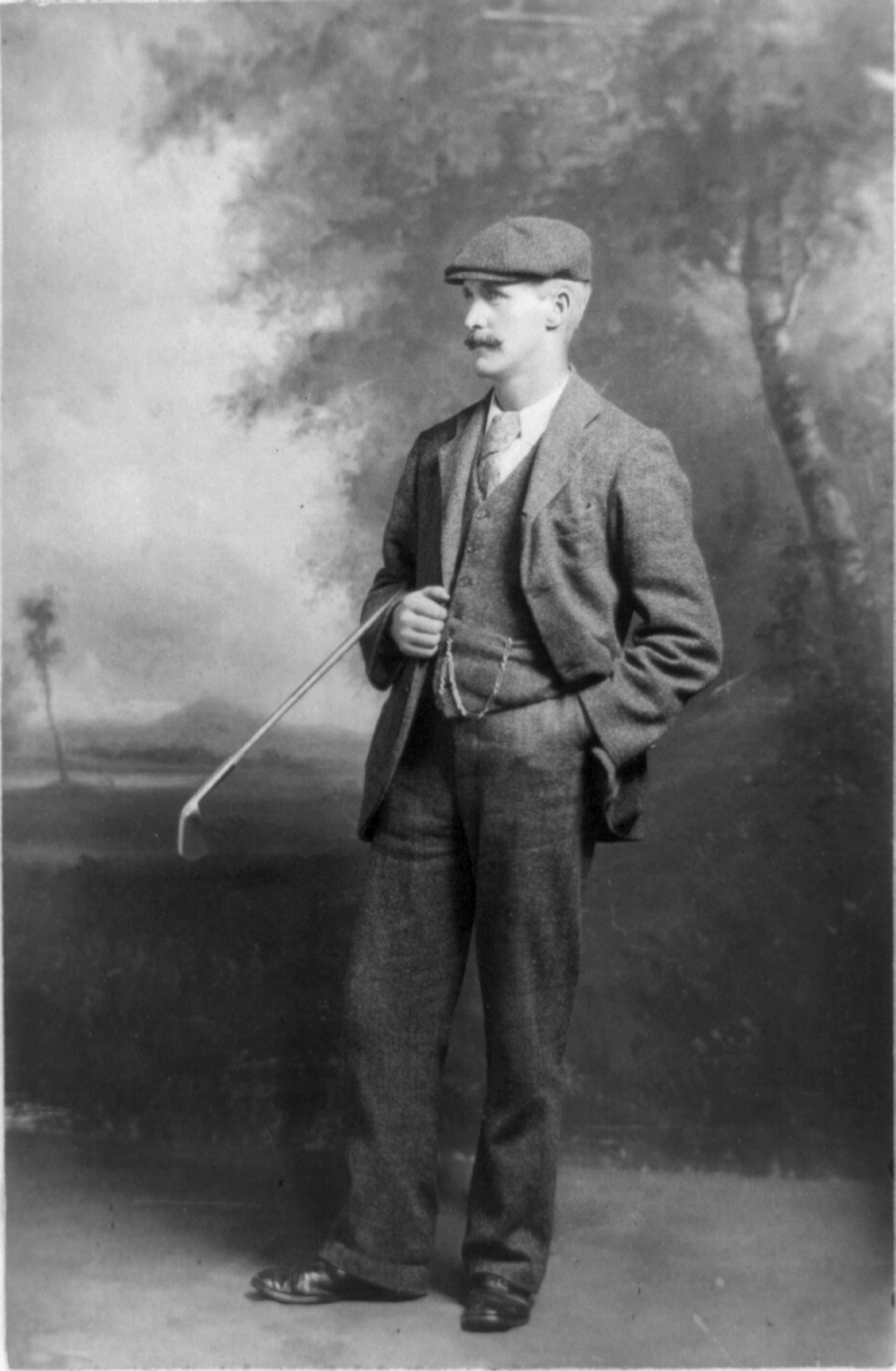
John Henry Taylor won five Open Championships

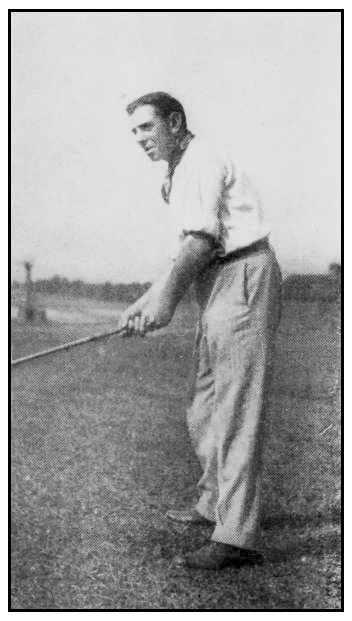
Willie Anderson won four U.S. Opens

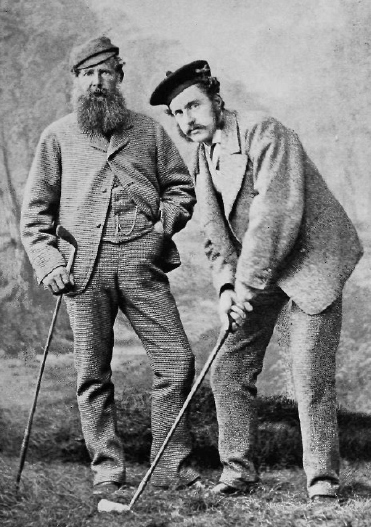
Tom Morris, Sr. and Tom Morris, Jr. both won four Open Championships

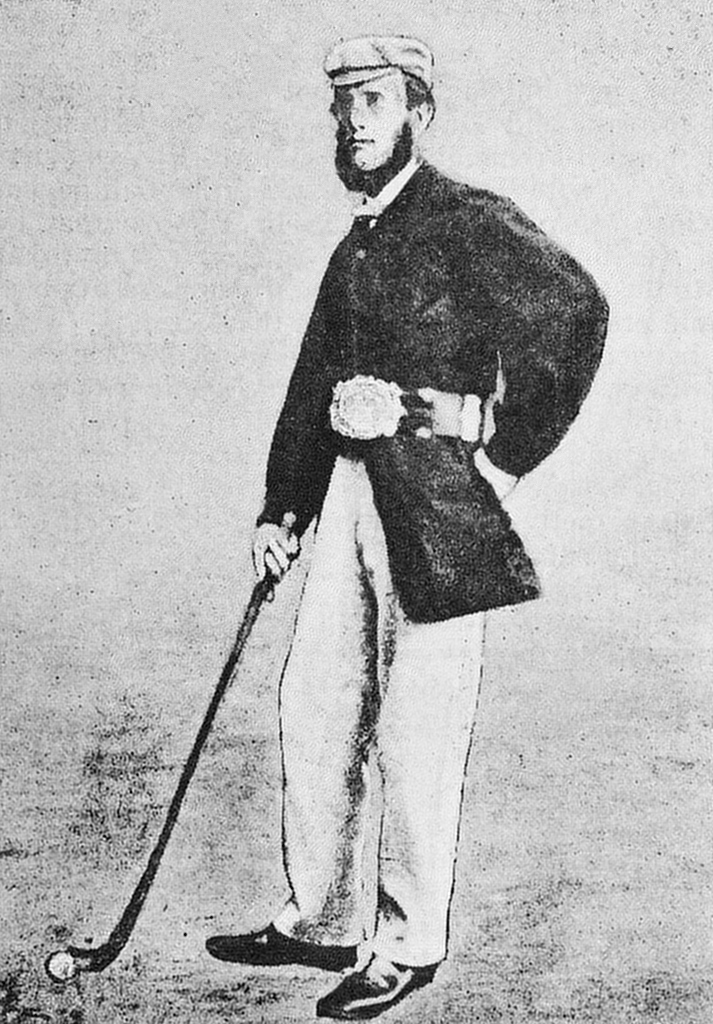
Willie Park, Sr. won four Open Championships

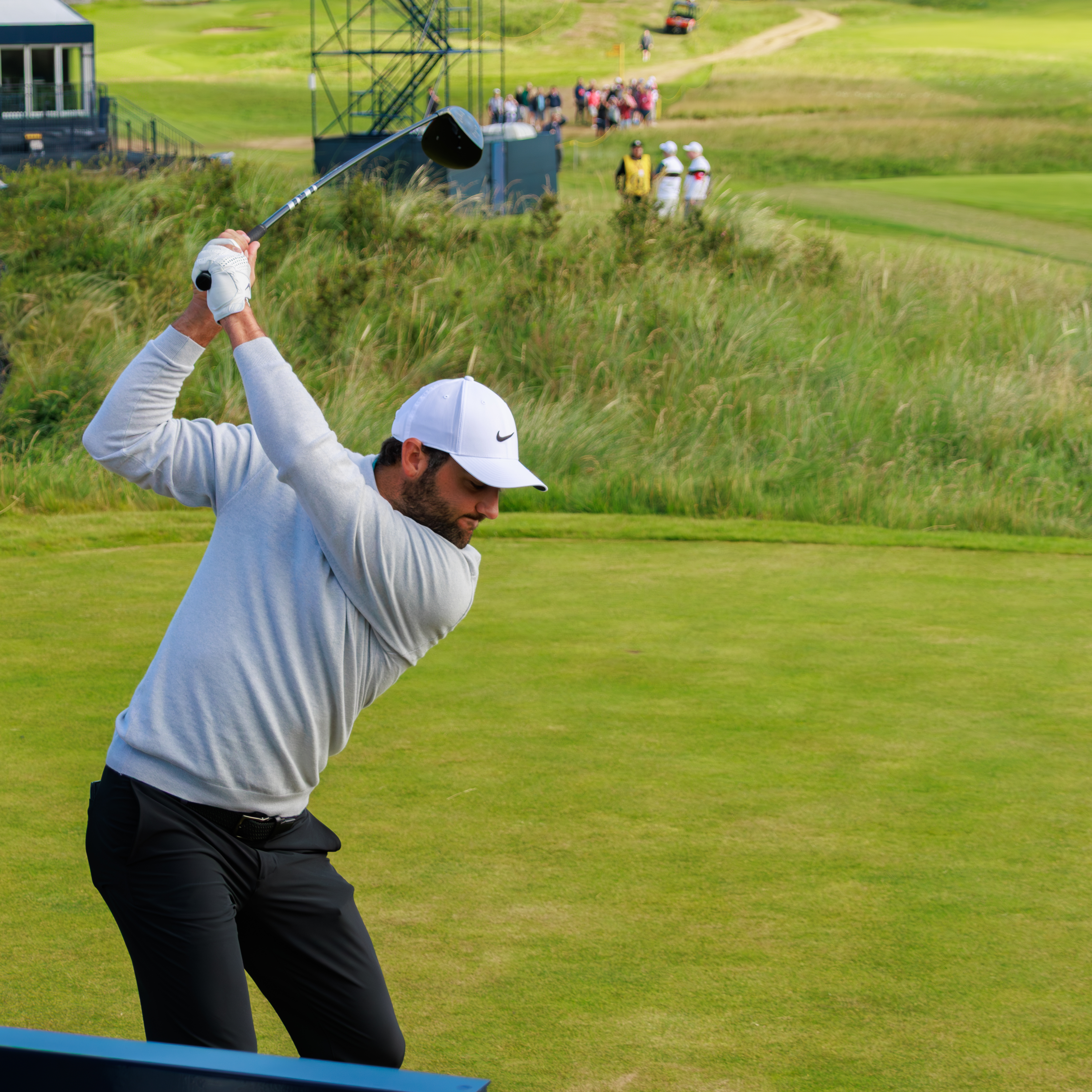
Scottie Scheffler has won four majors

== See also ==
- Chronological list of men's major golf champions
- List of LPGA major championship winning golfers
