= Willie Strath =

Scottish golfer (c. 1842–??)

Personal information
- Nationality: Scotland
- Born: c. 1842 Scotland
- Died: Scotland

Career
- Sport: Golf
- Status: Professional

Best results in major championships
- Masters Tournament: DNP
- PGA Championship: DNP
- U.S. Open: DNP
- The Open Championship: 6th: 1864

Willie Strath (born c. 1842) was a Scottish professional golfer. Strath placed sixth in the 1864 Open Championship.

== Early life ==
Strath was born in Scotland circa 1842.

== Golf career ==
=== 1864 Open Championship ===
The 1864 Open Championship was the fifth Open Championship and was contested on 16 September at Prestwick Golf Club. Tom Morris, Sr. won the championship for the third time, by two shots from Andrew Strath. There were sixteen competitors.

== Death ==
It is believed that Willie Strath died young from tuberculosis. His date of death is unknown.
