= 1866 Open Championship =

Tournament information
- Dates: 13 September 1866
- Location: Prestwick, South Ayrshire, Scotland
- Course: Prestwick Golf Club

Statistics
- Field: 16 players
- Prize fund: £11
- Winner's share: £6

Champion
- (Scotland) Willie Park, Sr.
- 169

Location in Scotland

The 1866 Open Championship was the seventh Open Championship and was held on 13 September at Prestwick Golf Club. Willie Park, Sr. won the championship for the third time, by two shots from his brother Davie Park. There were 16 competitors.

Played in a strong wind Willie Park was in the first group out and set the pace with a score of 54. Defending champion, Andrew Strath and Davie Park were four behind, scoring 58. Willie Park extended his lead to five strokes after the second round. Despite a final round of 59 Willie Park set a useful target of 169. Davie Park's final round of 56 gave him a total of 171 and second place. Robert Andrew was third, a further five strokes behind.

== Final leaderboard ==
Thursday, 13 September 1866

| Place | Player | Score | Money |
|---|---|---|---|
| 1 | (Scotland) Willie Park, Sr. | 54-56-59=169 | £6 |
| 2 | (Scotland) Davie Park | 58-57-56=171 | £3 |
| 3 | (Scotland) Robert Andrew | 58-59-59=176 | £2 |
| 4 | (Scotland) Tom Morris, Sr. | 61-58-59=178 | |
| 5 | (Scotland) Bob Kirk | 60-62-58=180 | |
| 6 | (Scotland) Andrew Strath | 61-61-60=182 | |
| T7 | (Scotland) John Allan | 60-63-60=183 | |
| T7 | (Scotland) William Doleman (a) | 60-60-63=183 | |
| 9 | (Scotland) Tom Morris, Jr. | 63-60-64=187 | |
| 10 | (Scotland) Willie Dunn, Sr. | 64-63-62=189 | |
