= John Allan (golfer) =

Scottish golfer

Personal information
- Full name: John Allan
- Nationality: Scotland
- Born: c. 1847 Prestwick, Ayrshire, Scotland
- Died: 14 February 1897 (aged 49) Prestwick, Ayrshire, Scotland

Career
- Sport: Golf
- Status: Professional

Best results in major championships
- Masters Tournament: DNP
- PGA Championship: DNP
- U.S. Open: DNP
- The Open Championship: T7: 1866

John Allan (c. 1847 – 14 February 1897) was a Scottish professional golfer. He was the professional at Royal North Devon Golf Club from 1867 until the late 1880s.

== Early life ==
Allan was born in Prestwick, Scotland, c. 1847. He was the son of Hugh and Mary Allan. Two of his younger brothers, Matthew (1858–1890) and Jamie (1861–1900) also became professional golfers.

== Golf career ==
Allan learnt his golf at Prestwick Golf Club while Old Tom Morris was there. After bried periods at Aberbeen and St. Andrews, he became the professional at Royal North Devon Golf Club, Westward Ho! in 1867. He remained at Westward Ho! for about 20 years before returning to Scotland to take up a position at Prestwick St. Nicholas Golf Club.

While at Royal North Devon, Allan was involved in the design of Kingsdown Golf Club in 1880 and Royal Cornwall Golf Club in the late 1880s.

== Death ==
Allan died in Prestwick on 14 February 1897 aged 49.

== Results in major championships ==
Tournament	1865	1866	1867	1868	1869	1870	1871	1872	1873	1874	1875	1876	1877	1878	1879
The Open Championship	T9	T7		T8		8	NT							T9	

Tournament	1880	1881	1882	1883	1884	1885	1886	1887	1888	1889	1890	1891	1892	1893
The Open Championship											T15		WD	T23

Note: Allan only played in The Open Championship.

Top 10
Did not play

NT = No tournament
WD = Withdrew
"T" indicates a tie for a place
