= Davie Park =

Scottish golfer

- Park at Leith Links on 17 May 1867

Personal information
- Full name: David Park
- Nationality: Scotland
- Born: c. 1840 Scotland

Career
- Sport: Golf
- Status: Professional

Best results in major championships
- Masters Tournament: DNP
- PGA Championship: DNP
- U.S. Open: DNP
- The Open Championship: 2nd: 1866

Davie Park (born c. 1840) was a Scottish professional golfer who played during the mid-to-late 19th century. Park had five top-10 finishes in The Open Championship. His best performance came in 1866 Open Championship when he placed second.

== Early life ==
David Park was born in Scotland circa 1840.

== Golf career ==
In addition to his on-the-course skills as a player, Park was also a club maker. Peter Paxton, who would go on to be a player as well as a club and ball maker, was an apprentice for Park.

=== 1866 Open Championship ===
Park's best chance to win a major championship came when he played in the 1866 Open Championship held on 13 September at Prestwick Golf Club. Park finished two shots back, losing to his brother Willie Park, Sr. who won the Championship for the third time. There were 16 competitors in the tournament.

==== Details of play ====
Playing in a strong wind, Willie Park was in the first group out and was the pacesetter with a score of 54. Defending champion Andrew Strath and Davie Park were four behind, scoring 58. Willie Park extended his lead to five strokes after the second round. Despite a final round of 59, Willie Park set a useful target of 169. Davie Park's final round of 56 gave him a total of 171 and second place. Robert Andrew was third, a further five strokes behind.

== Death ==
Park's date of death is unknown.

== Results in The Open Championship ==
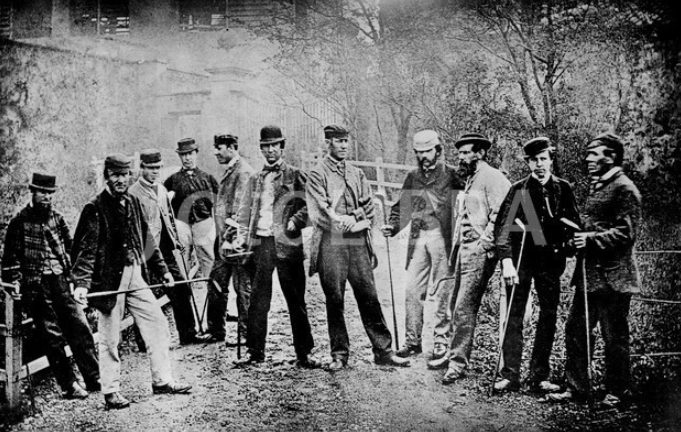
Park (second from left) at Leith Links in May 1867

Tournament	1861	1862	1863	1864	1865	1866	1867	1868	1869	1870	1871	1872	1873	1874
The Open Championship	4		3			2					NT	T4		T6

Note: Park played only in The Open Championship.

Top 10
Did not play

NT = no tournament
"T" indicates a tie for a place
