= 1864 Open Championship =

Golf tournament in Ayrshire, Scotland

Tournament information
- Dates: 16 September 1864
- Location: Prestwick, South Ayrshire, Scotland
- Course: Prestwick Golf Club

Statistics
- Field: 16 players
- Prize fund: £15
- Winner's share: £6

Champion
- (Scotland) Tom Morris, Sr.
- 167

Location in Scotland

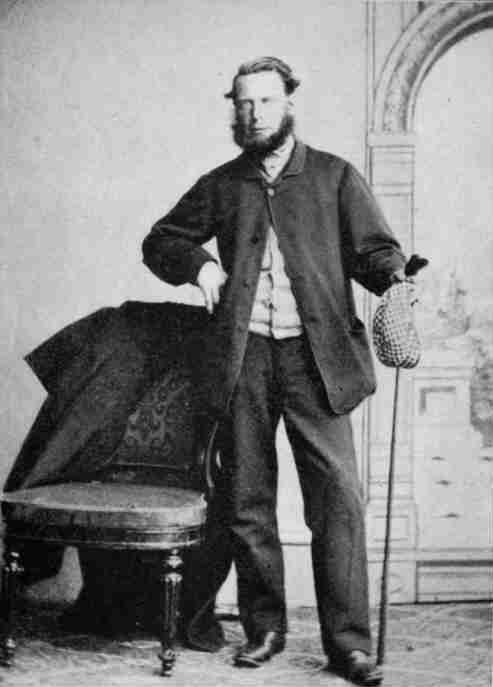
Tom Morris, Sr. winner of the Challenge Belt in 1864

The 1864 Open Championship was the fifth Open Championship and was held on 16 September at Prestwick Golf Club. Tom Morris, Sr. won the championship for the third time, by two shots from Andrew Strath. There were sixteen competitors.

Morris had the first round lead with a score of 54. Willie Park, Sr. was a stroke behind with Willie Dow and Strath a further stroke behind. Morris kept his lead after the second round with a 58 for a total of 112 with Strath in second place on 113. Park got into the "Alps" bunker and took 10, finishing with a round of 67 and dropped out of contention. Morris had a final round of 55 for a total of 167 while Strath's 56 left him two shots behind.

In practice before the event Tom Morris, Sr. had accomplished the unprecedented feat of scoring 49 for a round.

== Final leaderboard ==
Friday, 16 September 1864

Place	Player	Score	Money
1	(Scotland) Tom Morris, Sr.	54-58-55=167	£6
2	(Scotland) Andrew Strath	56-57-56=169	£5
3	(Scotland) Robert Andrew	57-58-60=175	£3
4	(Scotland) Willie Park, Sr.	55-67-55=177	£1
5	(Scotland) Willie Dow	56-58-67=181	
6	(Scotland) Willie Strath	60-62-60=182	

The scores of the other competitors are not known. Other sources do not mention the fourth prize.
