= Allan Robertson =

Scottish professional golfer (1815–1859)

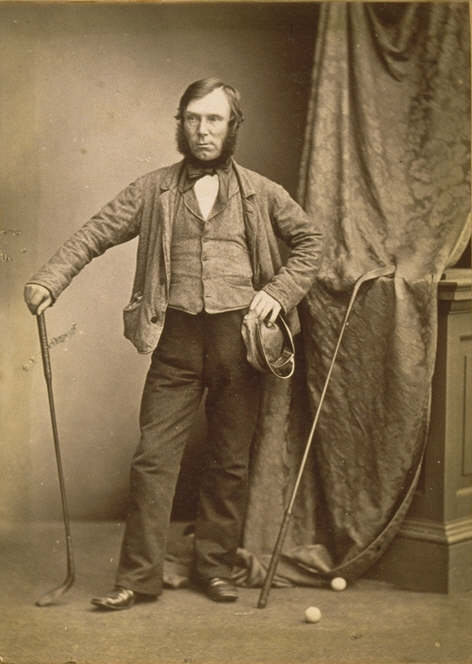
- Allan Robertson ca. 1850

Personal information
- Nationality: Scotland
- Born: 11 September 1815 St Andrews, Scotland
- Died: 1 September 1859 (aged 43) St Andrews, Scotland

Career
- Sport: Golf
- Status: Professional

Achievements and awards
- World Golf Hall of Fame: 2001 (member page)

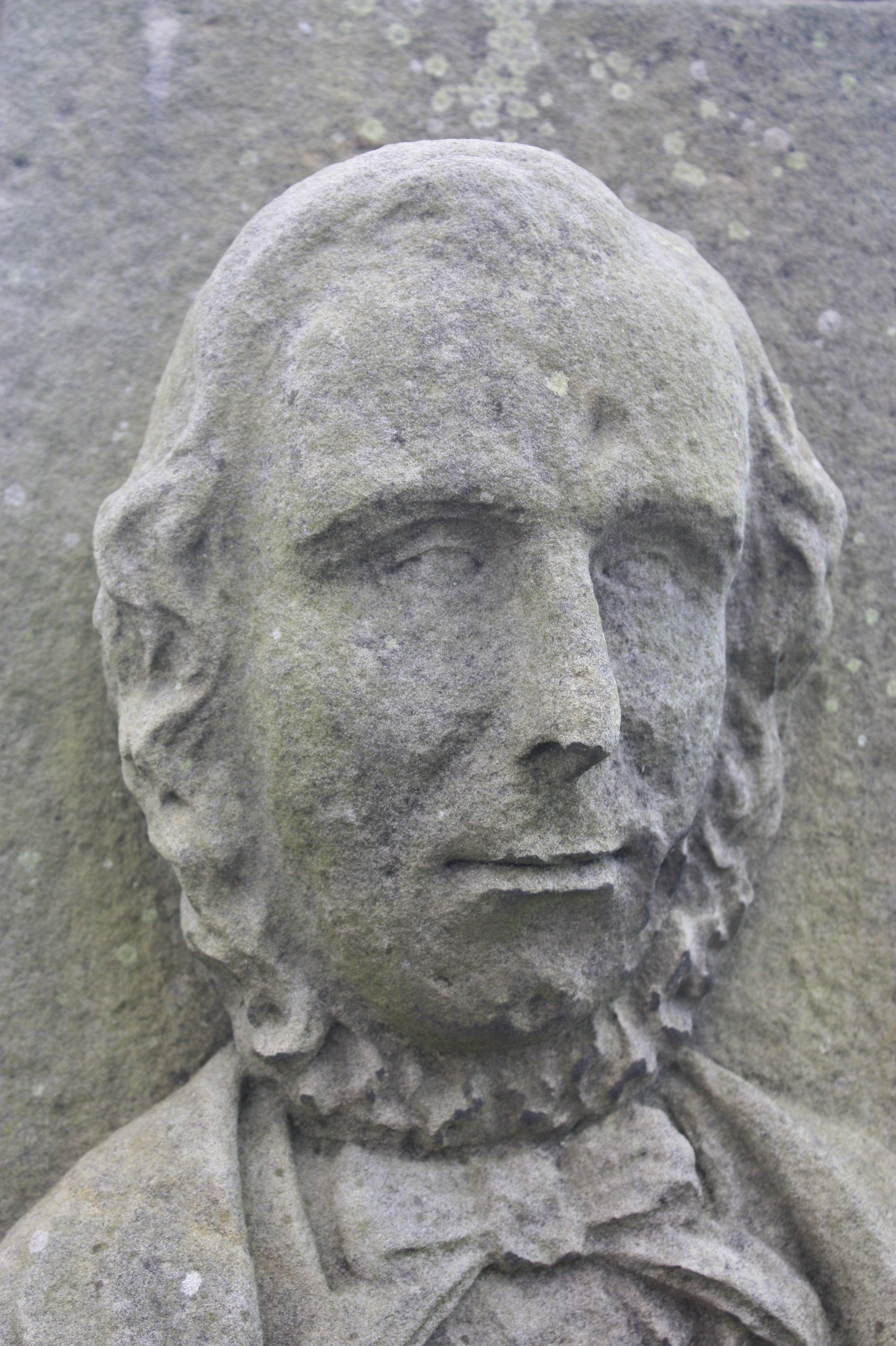
Robertson as carved on his grave, St Andrews

Allan Robertson (11 September 1815 – 1 September 1859) was considered to be one of the first professional golfers.

== Early years ==
In the mid-19th century golf was played mainly by well-off gentlemen, as hand-crafted clubs and balls were expensive. Professionals made a living from playing for bets, caddying, ball and club making, and instruction. Robertson was the most famous of these pros. Tradition has it that Robertson himself was never beaten as an individual when playing for money. He sometimes played at less than his ability in order to minimize the odds he had to give to opponents. Robertson is generally regarded as being the best golfer from 1843 onwards, even after the arrival of the Park and Morris families. Robertson defeated Willie Dunn, Sr., of Musselburgh, who was generally recognized as the top player, in a grand challenge match in 1843; the two played 20 rounds over 10 days, with Robertson coming out on top. Indeed, Robertson was the first to score below 80 on the Old Course at St Andrews, which he did the year before his death, playing a guttie ball.

Robertson was a prominent feather ball maker, exporting his merchandise internationally. The business was originally set up by his grandfather, who passed it down to his son before Robertson himself finally inherited it. Today a Robertson ball carrying his stamp "Allan" is highly prized by collectors.

== Old Tom Morris apprenticeship under Robertson ==
Old Tom Morris worked from 1839, when he was 18, as an apprentice in Robertson's shop, and it is said that the two were never beaten when playing as partners. Morris defeated Robertson for the first time in a friendly match in 1843, winning a jacket, but the two generally did not compete head-to-head for stakes. Robertson, as the acknowledged best player, could refuse any challenge according to the custom of the time, and said he preferred Morris as his playing partner; Morris was in an awkward position with respect to individual playing reputations, since he worked for Robertson, who eventually fired him after a disagreement over equipment. However, for many years before that, Robertson and Morris had a lucrative playing partnership. Musselburgh's young star Willie Park, Sr., then aged 20, beat Morris head-to-head over the Old Course in 1853, and then publicly issued a head-to-head challenge to Robertson, which was not taken up. Challenge matches, usually backed by noblemen and wealthy businessmen, were the main form of golf competition at the time.

Robertson significantly improved the Old Course by enlarging its greens, to allow for the increase in golf popularity. The out-and-back flow of play over a narrow strand of fairway at the Old Course eventually led to the establishment of huge double greens, virtually unique in Scotland; these have occasionally been imitated in modern golf design. Robertson's first golf course design work, in which he was assisted by Morris, was at Carnoustie in 1842, when the two laid out ten new holes. Carnoustie gradually evolved into one of the world's best courses.

== Loss of golf ball market share ==
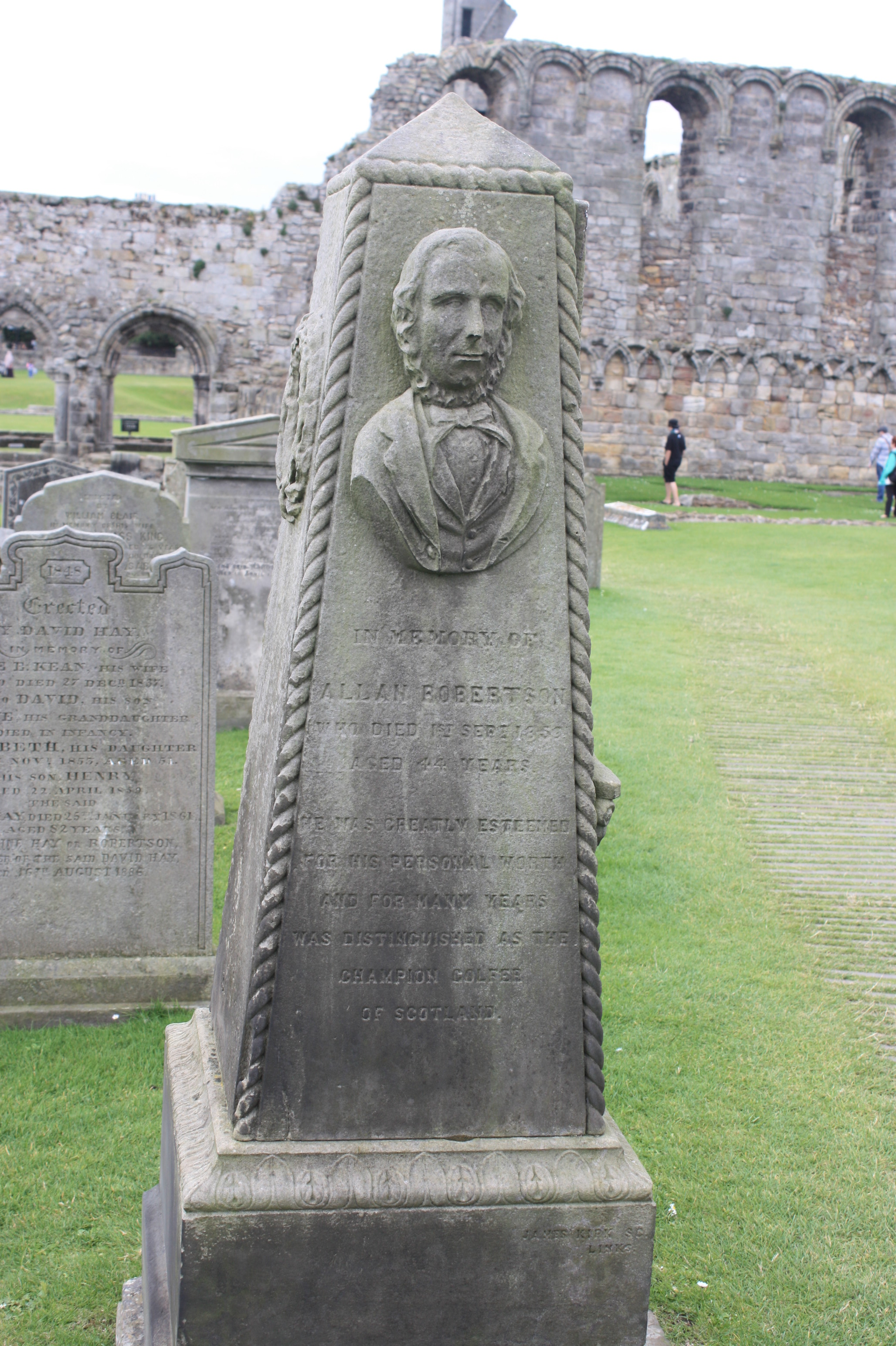
The grave of Allan Robertson, St Andrews Cathedral churchyard

The relationship between Robertson and Morris soured briefly when the guttie ball was introduced (see golf ball - history). Robertson learned that Morris had played with a guttie, and that was the end of their work relationship. Robertson attempted to suppress the popularity of the new and cheaper ball, which hastened the end of the Robertson 200-year old family business making featherie balls. Morris accepted the march of progress and felt obliged to leave Robertson and set up his own workshop. Morris moved to Prestwick in 1851, on the west coast of Scotland, to build a new golf course, where he served as professional and greenkeeper. The guttie ball revolutionized golf and Robertson's featherie business did indeed collapse, although Robertson quickly moved to manufacture the guttie, which was made from liquid rubber (gutta percha) found in Malaysia.

== Death ==
Robertson died a few months after an attack of jaundice. The Royal and Ancient Golf Club of St Andrews issued a statement on his death exalting his contribution to golf, and organised an annual collection to provide for his widow. Robertson's portrait is displayed in the Royal and Ancient Golf Club's gallery.

His grave is in the churchyard of St Andrews Cathedral, just west of the central bell-tower. It is a sandstone obelisk bearing his sculpted portrait. His epitaph reads: "Allan Robertson - who died 1st Sept. 1859 aged 44 years old. He was greatly esteemed for his personal worth and for many years was distinguished as the champion golfer of Scotland."

== Legacy ==
The Open Championship in golf came about as a result of Robertson's death. Since he was recognized as the best player during much of his lifetime, golfers at Prestwick Golf Club formed a competition in 1860, to decide who would succeed him as the "Champion Golfer". The Open, continuing annually ever since except for war years, is the longest-running golf championship, and the oldest of the four major championships.
