= Prestwick Golf Club =

Golf course in South Ayrshire, Scotland

- Location in Scotland
- 55°30′5″N 4°36′55″W

Club information
- Location: Prestwick, South Ayrshire, Scotland
- Established: 1851
- Type: Private
- Total holes: 18
- Tournaments: The Open Championship; The Amateur Championship
- Website: prestwickgc.co.uk
- Designed by: Old Tom Morris
- Par: 71
- Length: 6,544 yards (5,984 m)
- Course rating: 75
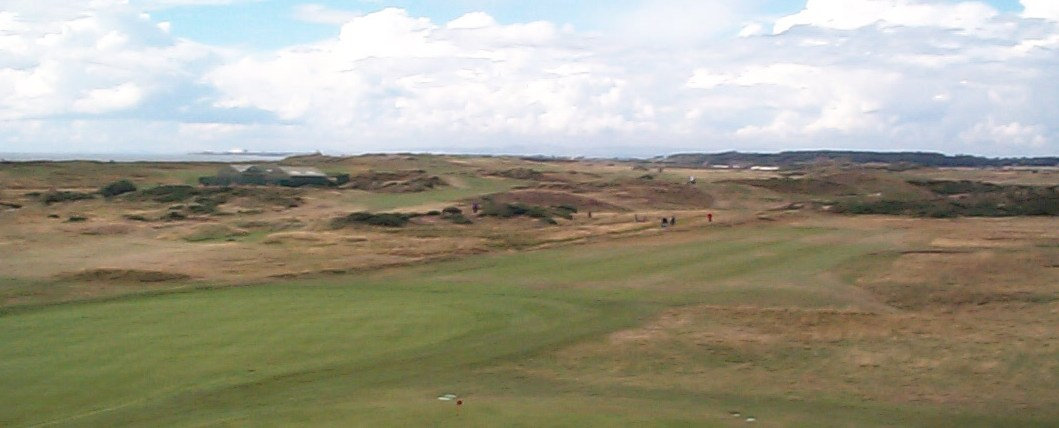
- 18th hole at Prestwick in 2000

Prestwick Golf Club is a golf course in Prestwick, South Ayrshire, Scotland. It is approximately 30 miles (50 km) southwest of Scotland's largest city, Glasgow. Prestwick is a classic links course, built on the rolling sandy land between the beach and the hinterland. The course is near the Prestwick airport, and some holes run along railway tracks on the eastern side of the course.

The Open Championship was first held at Prestwick Golf Club, and was played there 24 times between 1860 and 1925.

== History ==
Golf had been played over the links at Prestwick for many years before the club was formally organized in 1851. Old Tom Morris was the club's "Keeper of the Green, Ball and Club Maker" from 1851 to 1864. He designed and built the original 12-hole course, which measured 3,799 yards, 578 of which were on the first hole. In common with other courses, many of Prestwick's original holes crossed over the same undulating terrain; no more than two dozen golf clubs existed anywhere in the world at that time. Six of the original greens are still used by the present 18-hole course, which also includes three of the original holes: 2nd (Alps), 3rd (Cardinal) and 5th (Sea Headrig).

Morris, originally from St Andrews, returned there to take charge of their links in 1865, but also assisted Prestwick when it extended its course to 18 holes in 1882 after the club acquired significantly more land to the north of its original lay-out. With the course's expansion to 18 holes, which had become the game's standard, cross-routing was eliminated.

=== Originates the Open Championship ===
Prestwick is famous as the initial originator and sponsor of The Open Championship, the oldest of golf's four major championships. Discussion of The Open's future concept began soon after the 1859 death of Allan Robertson, longtime professional at St Andrews, who had been considered supreme for some 20 years until his death; the concept of the Open was to find the new 'champion golfer'.

The first Open was held in October 1860, with three trips in one day over the course's 12 holes to make for 36 holes; the field consisted of eight leading professionals. The winner was presented with a red Morocco Belt with silver clasps purchased by the members at a cost of £25. The club annually staged all the Opens up to 1870, as well as the 1872 Open; cash prizes were also awarded to leading finishers. Young Tom Morris, son of Old Tom, learned his golf from boyhood at Prestwick, and captured four consecutive Opens held there from 1868 to 1872 (there was no Open in 1871). By winning the Belt three straight times, Young Tom was entitled under the conditions of the competition to keep it, so there was no prize to play for in 1871, and hence no Open.

Prestwick remained in the Open's rotation until 1925, hosting the championship 24 times in all, which is second only to the Old Course. In 1925 crowd control became very problematic, as thousands of people overwhelmed the marshals, which were far too few in number to control them, and this situation disrupted the play of the championship, affecting the outcome, since many players' shots hit spectators and were deflected. Bernard Darwin, the era's leading golf writer, reported from the scene that he doubted the Open should be held ever again at Prestwick, and such has proved the case. The course's cramped layout does make hosting of events with large galleries highly problematic, although the course's challenge remains intact to test the modern generation of players. Prestwick has also staged the Amateur Championship on eleven occasions, most recently in 2001.

== Natural features ==
The River Pow, or the Pow Burn, flows through the golf club's property, and the river is a natural obstacle, there are fish and other species of rare nature in the river, so nature watchers are welcome there.

There are several sand dunes in the centre of the course. The tallest of the three is Pow Hill, the next tallest is The Queens Jack, and the third tallest is Cearcevlock Hill. Blind shots from the tee at the short fifth and on the approach to the par-4 17th add considerably to the mystery and charm of the course. The most famous hole is the third, a par 5, dogleg right, of 500 yards, where the fairway simply ends about 300 yards from the tee, as the land descends into a vast, deep bunker, nicknamed the 'Cardinal', about 50 yards across, which is buttressed by railway sleepers. Many championship hopes have died in this bunker. The Pow Burn flanks the hole down its entire right side. The Irish Sea / Firth of Clyde forms the western boundary of the course, flanked by sand dunes. The Royal Troon Golf Club sits immediately to the north of Prestwick's course and nearby Turnberry is down the coast, to the southwest.

Like many of Scotland's other leading courses, Prestwick is a private members' club, but visitors may book to play the course on most days of the week.

== The Open Championship ==
The winners of The Open Championship at Prestwick Golf Club.

Year	Winner	Score			
Year	Winner	R1	R2	R3	Total
1860	(Scotland) Willie Park, Sr. ^{1st}	55	59	60	174
1861	(Scotland) Tom Morris, Sr. ^{1st}	54	56	53	163
1862	(Scotland) Tom Morris, Sr. ^{2nd}	52	55	56	163
1863	(Scotland) Willie Park, Sr. ^{2nd}	56	54	58	168
1864	(Scotland) Tom Morris, Sr. ^{3rd}	54	58	55	167
1865	(Scotland) Andrew Strath ^{1st}	55	54	53	162
1866	(Scotland) Willie Park, Sr. ^{3rd}	54	56	59	169
1867	(Scotland) Tom Morris, Sr. ^{4th}	58	54	58	170
1868	(Scotland) Tom Morris, Jr. ^{1st}	51	54	49	154
1869	(Scotland) Tom Morris, Jr. ^{2nd}	50	55	52	157
1870	(Scotland) Tom Morris, Jr. ^{3rd}	47	51	51	149
1872	(Scotland) Tom Morris, Jr. ^{4th}	57	56	53	166
1875	(Scotland) Willie Park, Sr. ^{4th}	56	59	51	166
1878	(Scotland) Jamie Anderson ^{2nd}	53	53	51	157
1881	(Scotland) Bob Ferguson ^{2nd}	53	60	57	170

Year	Winner	Score		
Year	Winner	R1	R2	Total
1884	(Scotland) Jack Simpson ^{1st}	78	82	160
1887	(Scotland) Willie Park, Jr. ^{1st}	82	79	161
1890	(England) John Ball (a) ^{1st}	82	82	164

Year	Winner	Score				
Year	Winner	R1	R2	R3	R4	Total
1893	(Scotland) Willie Auchterlonie ^{1st}	78	81	81	82	322
1898	(Jersey) Harry Vardon ^{2nd}	79	75	77	76	307
1903	(Jersey) Harry Vardon ^{4th}	73	77	72	78	300
1908	(Scotland) James Braid ^{4th}	70	72	77	72	291
1914	(Jersey) Harry Vardon ^{6th}	73	77	78	78	306
1925	(England) Jim Barnes ^{1st}	70	77	79	74	300

(a) denotes amateur
