= Andrew Strath =

Scottish professional golfer (1837–1868)

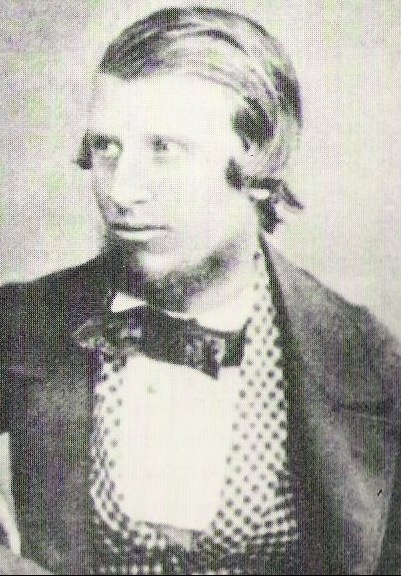
- Strath, c. 1865

Personal information
- Full name: Andrew Anderson Strath
- Nationality: Scotland
- Born: 1 March 1837 St Andrews, Scotland
- Died: 23 February 1868 (aged 30) Prestwick, Scotland
- Spouse: Euphemia Johnston
- Children: 6

Career
- Sport: Golf
- Status: Professional

Best results in major championships (wins: 1)
- The Open Championship: Won: 1865

Andrew Anderson Strath (1 March 1837 – 23 February 1868) was a Scottish professional golfer who played in the mid-19th century. He won the 1865 Open Championship. In total, he accumulated six top-10 finishes in The Open Championship.

== Early life ==
Strath was born in St Andrews, Scotland, on 1 March 1837, the son of Alexander Strath and Susan Strath (née Reid). On 19 March 1858 he married Euphemia Johnston and the couple had six children. Strath had two brothers, Davie and George, who also became professional golfers.

== Professional career ==
Like most professionals of his era Strath did not make his living from tournaments. He began his working life as an apprentice to a clubmaker and sometimes partnered Old Tom Morris in the challenge matches which were a feature of golf at the time. He was famous for the amount of backspin he could get on his iron shots. Golf matches at this time in history were generally contested on an alternate shot basis. For example, if Old Tom hit the drive off the tee box then Strath would play the second shot.

In May 1857, Strath was partnered with Allan Robertson and played a challenge match against Old Tom Morris and Willie Park, Sr. They won the match by six holes.

=== 1865 Open Championship ===
Strath won The Open Championship in 1865, becoming the only man to break the early domination of the event by Willie Park, Sr. and the two Tom Morrises, father and son. His winning scorecard is on display in the clubhouse at Prestwick Golf Club, which also possesses Strath's application letter for the post of keeper of the green in 1865. He also finished third in 1860, fourth in 1863, second in 1864 and third in 1867.

In 1865, he had succeeded Charlie Hunter, who moved to Blackheath less than a year after taking over from Old Tom Morris as green keeper at Prestwick. Strath's tenure only lasted three years as he died in Prestwick golfhouse of "pneumonia running on to phthisis" (i.e. tuberculosis) at the age of 30. His brothers George and Davie were also golfers. Davie was considered the best player of the three, but like Andrew he died young. George, who died in 1919, served as the first professional at Royal Troon before emigrating to the United States.

== Death and legacy ==
Strath died in Prestwick, Scotland, on 23 February 1868. His wife Euphemia died in 1869. Strath is best remembered for winning the 1865 Open Championship.

== Major championships ==
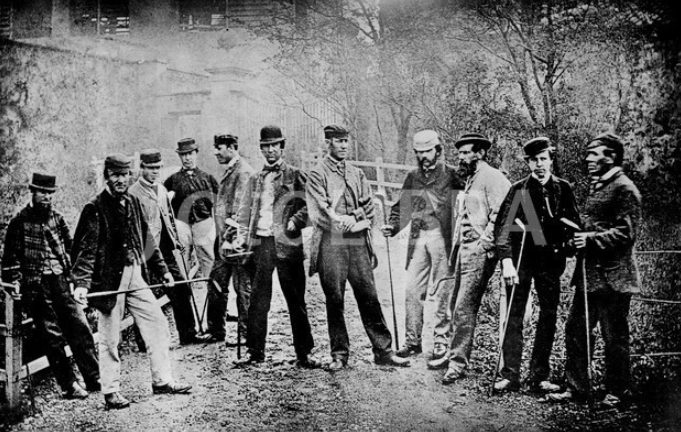
Strath (far left) at the Leith Links Tournament in 1867

=== Wins (1) ===
Year	Championship	24 holes	Winning score	Margin	Runner-up
1865	The Open Championship	1 shot deficit	55-54-53=162	2 strokes	(Scotland) Willie Park, Sr.

=== Results timeline ===
Tournament	1860	1861	1862	1863	1864	1865	1866	1867
The Open Championship	3			4	2	1	6	3

Note: The Open Championship was the only major played during Strath's lifetime.

Win
Top 10
Did not play
