= Old Tom Morris =

Scottish professional golfer (1821–1908)

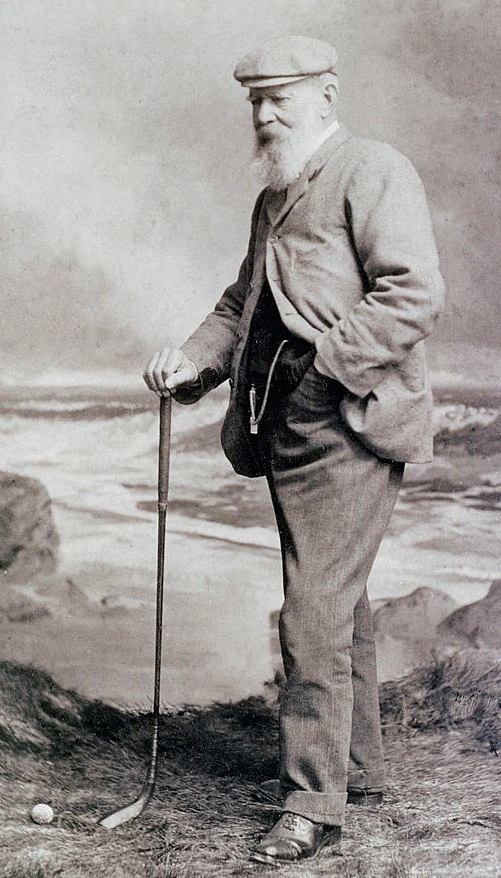
- Morris in 1901

Personal information
- Full name: Thomas Mitchell Morris
- Nicknames: Old Tom, The Grand Old Man of Golf
- Nationality: Scotland
- Born: 16 June 1821 St Andrews, Fife, Scotland
- Died: 24 May 1908 (aged 86) St Andrews, Scotland
- Spouse: Agnes (Nancy) Bayne (m. 1844; died 1876)
- Children: 4 (Tom, Elizabeth, James, John)

Career
- Sport: Golf
- Status: Professional

Best results in major championships (wins: 4)
- The Open Championship: Won: 1861, 1862, 1864, 1867

Achievements and awards
- World Golf Hall of Fame: 1976 (member page)

Thomas Mitchell Morris (16 June 1821 – 24 May 1908), otherwise known as Old Tom Morris, and The Grand Old Man of Golf, was a Scottish golfer. He was born in St Andrews, Fife, the "home of golf" and location of the St Andrews Links, and died there as well. Young Tom Morris (died 1875), also a golfer, was his son.

== Early golf career ==
The house where Morris was born no longer exists, but it is thought to be close to 121 North Street, St Andrews. He was the son of a weaver, and was educated at Madras College in his home town. He began golf by age ten, by knocking wine-bottle corks pierced with nails (to serve as balls) around the streets of the town using a homemade club, in informal matches against other youths; this was known as 'sollybodkins'. He started caddying and playing golf from a young age, and formally was hired as an apprentice at age 14 to Allan Robertson, generally regarded as the world's first professional golfer; Robertson ran the St Andrews Links and an equipment-making business. Morris served four years as apprentice and a further five years as journeyman under Robertson, by most accounts the world's top player from about 1843 until his death in 1859.

From the early 1840s, Robertson often chose Morris as his partner in challenge matches, played by alternate shot format, which were the principal form of competition at that time. It was said the two never lost a team match played on even terms. The team became known as "The Invincibles". By the time Morris was in his early 20s he was the second-best player in St. Andrews, close to Robertson in golf skill, and won an informal match from him over the Old Course in 1843, but the two players rarely played seriously head-to-head. As Robertson's employee, Morris was in somewhat of an awkward position. He was a long-time member of the St Andrews Golf Club.

== Moves to Prestwick ==
I can remember the circumstances well. Allan (Robertson) could not reconcile himself to the new ball at first at all. But the gutta became the fashion very quickly, so what could we do? One day, and it is one that will always be clearly stamped upon my memory, I had been playing golf with a Mr. Campbell of Saddell, and I had the misfortune to lose all my supply of balls, which were, you can understand, very much easier lost in those days, and Mr. Campbell kindly gave me a gutta to try. I took to it at once, and as we were playing in, it so happened that we met Allan coming out, and someone told him that I was playing a very good game with one of the new gutta balls, and I could see fine from the expression on his face, that he did not like it at all. And, when we met afterwards in his shop, we had some high words about the matter, and then and there we parted company, I leaving his employment. - Old Tom Morris

Morris worked under Robertson at St Andrews until 1848, when he was fired on the spot after being caught by Robertson playing the new gutta percha golf ball ("guttie"); Robertson had a profitable business making the featherie golf ball, which was threatened by the emergence of the guttie. Morris was then hired by Prestwick Golf Club in 1851, which was just starting up. At Prestwick, he designed, laid out, and maintained the course, ran his own golf equipment business selling gutties and clubs, gave instruction to players, and ran events. He was influential in beginning The Open Championship in 1860, along with James Fairlie, and struck the very first shot in that event.

== Return to St Andrews ==
Morris was sought out by the Royal and Ancient Golf Club, which formally passed a motion in 1864 calling for his rehiring. Morris returned to St Andrews in 1864 to take charge of the links, as Keeper of the Green and professional, at a then-generous salary of £50 per year. St Andrews was then in very poor condition, and his first task was to correct this. He did so by widening the fairways, enlarging the greens, applying greenkeeping techniques he had developed at Prestwick, building two new greens (on holes 1 and 18), and "managing" the hazards. He stayed in the post until 1903, a total of 39 years, and was kept on afterwards by the R&A at full salary.

== Competitive highlights ==
Morris worked as a greenkeeper, clubmaker, ballmaker, golf instructor, and course designer, as well as playing match and tournament golf. He came second in the first Open Championship in 1860, and won the event in 1861, the first year that was open to amateurs. He followed this up with further victories in 1862, 1864 and 1867. He still holds the record as the oldest winner of The Open Championship at 46. Also, he was part of the only father/son couple being winner and runner-up.

Morris held the record for the largest margin of victory in a major championship (13 strokes in the 1862 Open Championship), which stood until Tiger Woods won the 2000 US Open by 15 strokes. He became the second player to break 80 over the Old Course, scoring 79; Robertson had been the first to do it. Once his son Young Tom Morris became an accomplished player in his own right by his mid-teens, in the mid-1860s, father and son formed a team for challenge matches, usually played by alternate shot (foursomes play), where they proved very successful. Their partnership, although not exclusive, would continue until the death of Young Tom in 1875.

== Golf course design, greenkeeping innovations ==
Morris played a role in designing courses across the British Isles. He began by assisting Robertson to lay out ten holes at Carnoustie in 1842. In 1871 he visited Forfar, in Scotland, where he created the first golf course in the world that was originally designed with 18 holes, Forfar Golf Club. His subsequent work included Kingussie Golf Club in 1895, Kinghorn Golf Club in 1887, Kirkcaldy Golf Club Nov 1904 9- holes then May 1906 18 holes, Prestwick, Muirfield, Machrihanish, the Jubilee Course at St Andrews, Balcomie at Crail, Moray, Bridge of Allan Golf Club, Askernish in South Uist, Lahinch and Rosapenna in Ireland, Warkworth, Wallasey and Royal North Devon Golf Club (Westward Ho!) in England, King Edward Bay Golf Club in the Isle of Man and the Castletown Golf Club in the Isle of Man. Glasgow Golf Club's Killermont course was his last 18 hole design, opening in 1904, just four years before his death.

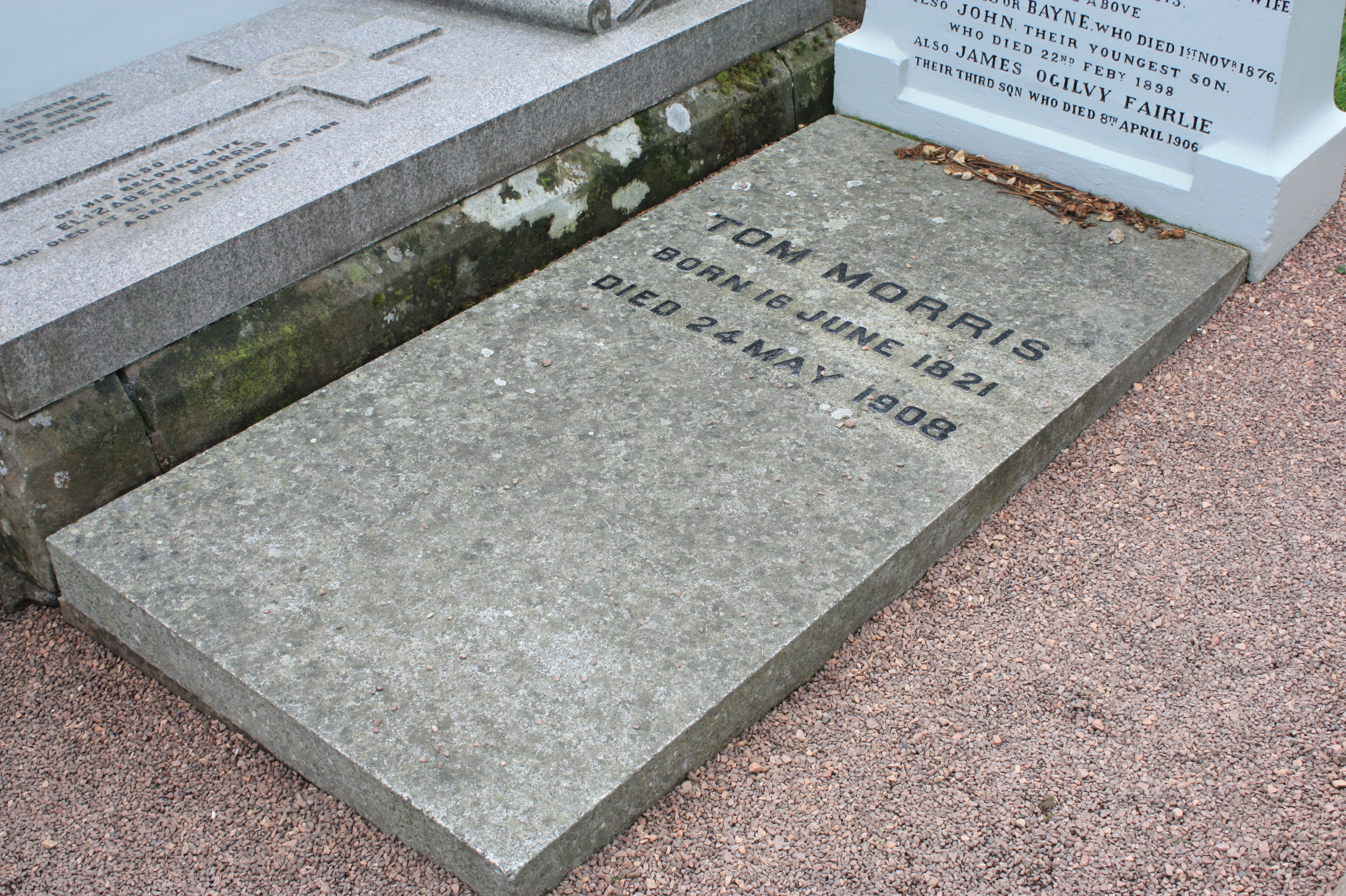
The simple grave of Old Tom Morris, St Andrews Cathedral churchyard

Morris was also the father of modern greenkeeping. He introduced the concept of top-dressing greens with sand, which significantly helped turf growth. He introduced many novel ideas on turf and course management, including actively managing hazards (in the past, bunkers and the like were largely left to their own devices, becoming truly "hazardous") and yardage markers. He was the first to use a push mower to cut greens. He improved play at St Andrews by widening fairways to handle increased play, improving greens, and establishing separate teeing areas on each hole; all of these measures spread out play over larger areas, and led to better turf conditions. He created a new first green on the Old Course, and was responsible for the initial design of the New Course 1895 and Jubilee course in 1897. He also introduced the modern idea of placing hazards so that the golf ball could be routed around them; this was the beginning of strategic design, which has dominated golf course design ever since. Before his time hazards were thought of as obstacles that either had to be carried or were there to punish a wayward ball. When he was 77 he was nearly beaten by Rhona Adair at St Andrews Links. Adair was one of the leading women players. He is quoted as having said: "I'll no' be licked by a lassie".

== Death ==
Morris kept working right up until his death, just before his 87th birthday. He died in the Memorial Cottage Hospital, St Andrews, after falling down a flight of stairs in the clubhouse of The New Golf Club in St Andrews.

He is buried against the eastern wall of the churchyard of St Andrew's Cathedral. The grave is simple but stands beneath the highly notable monument to his son, Young Tom Morris, which carries a bronze statue of the golfer in high relief against a white background, and is visible across the breadth of the churchyard. His grave attracts thousands of golfers each year who wish to pay homage to this golfing hero.

== Awards and honors ==
In 1976, Morris was inducted into the World Golf Hall of Fame.

== Professional wins (4) ==
- 1861 Open Championship
- 1862 Open Championship
- 1864 Open Championship
- 1867 Open Championship

== Major championships ==
=== Wins (4) ===
Year	Championship	24 holes	Winning score	Margin	Runner-up
1861	The Open Championship	2 shot deficit	54-56-53=163	4 strokes	(Scotland) Willie Park, Sr.
1862	The Open Championship (2)	11 shot lead	52-55-56=163	13 strokes	(Scotland) Willie Park, Sr.
1864	The Open Championship (3)	1 shot lead	54-58-55=167	2 strokes	(Scotland) Andrew Strath
1867	The Open Championship (4)	2 shot lead	58-54-58=170	2 strokes	(Scotland) Willie Park, Sr.

=== Results timeline ===
Tournament	1860	1861	1862	1863	1864	1865	1866	1867	1868	1869
The Open Championship	2	1	1	2	1	5	4	1	2	6

Tournament	1870	1871	1872	1873	1874	1875	1876	1877	1878	1879
The Open Championship	4	NT	T4	7	T18		T4	T8	11	T14

Tournament	1880	1881	1882	1883	1884	1885	1886	1887	1888	1889
The Open Championship	10	T5		T10	T13	T29	T27	T28	T27	T15

Tournament	1890	1891	1892	1893	1894	1895	1896
The Open Championship	WD	T58	50	52	WD	47	WD

Win
Top 10
Did not play

NT = No tournament
WD = Withdrew
"T" indicates a tie for a place

== Depictions in film and print ==
The 2016 film Tommy's Honour depicts the lives and careers of Old Tom and his son, and focuses on their complex and bittersweet relationship. It is based on Kevin Cook's Herbert Warren Wind Book Award–winning 2007 biography, Tommy's Honor: The Story of Old Tom Morris and Young Tom Morris, Golf's Founding Father and Son.

== Gallery ==
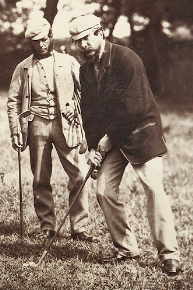
Morris (left) with James Ogilvie Fairlie, c. 1850

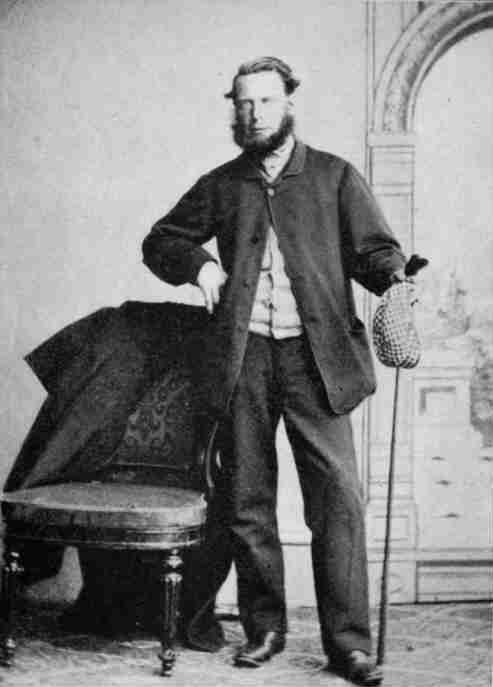
Tom Morris in 1860

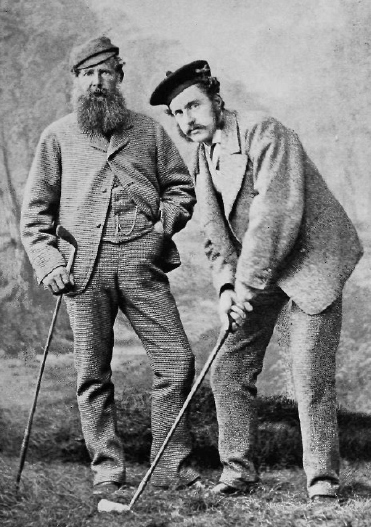
Old Tom Morris with Young Tom Morris, c. 1870-75

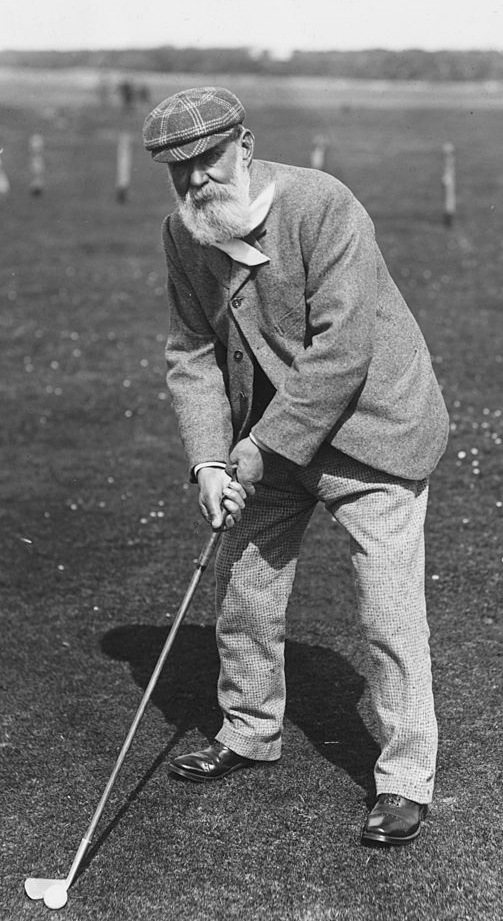
Old Tom Morris in 1880

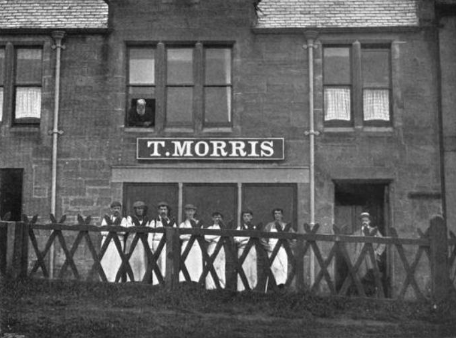
The golf shop of Old Tom Morris in St Andrews, Scotland, c. 1890. Morris is looking out the second storey window (upper left).

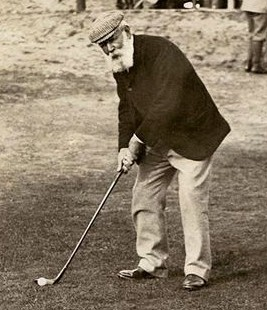
Old Tom Morris on the Himalayas putting course in 1892, which he designed

== See also ==
- Old Tom Morris Award
- People on Scottish banknotes
- Tom Morris Golf Shop
