= Willie Park Sr. =

Scottish professional golfer (1833–1903)

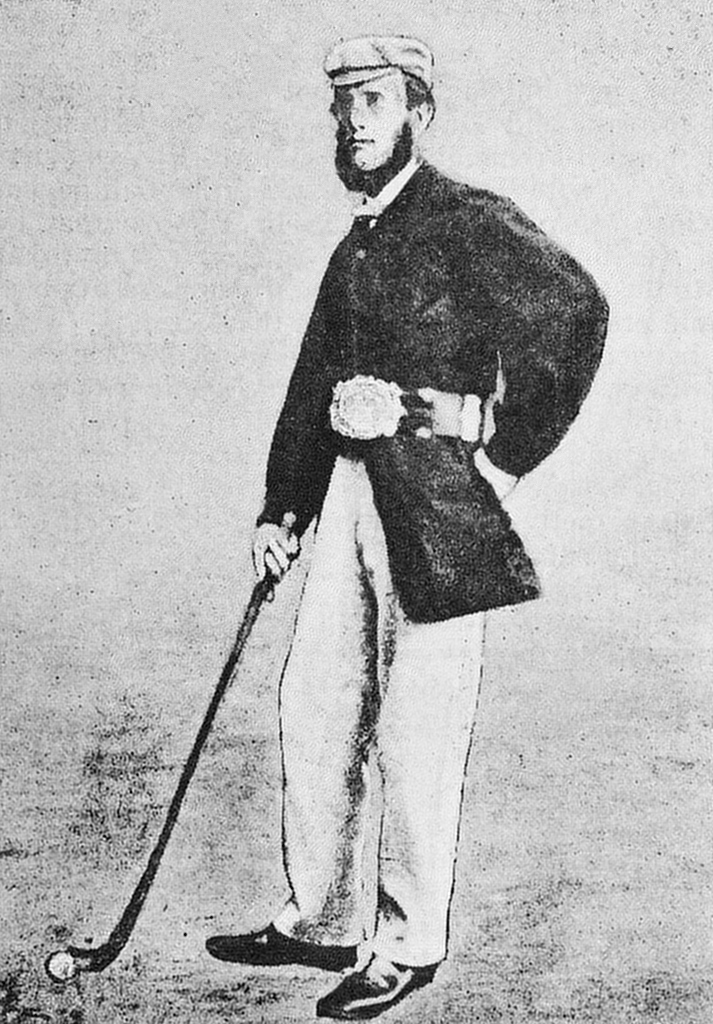
- Park wearing the Challenge Belt

Personal information
- Full name: William Park Sr.
- Nickname: Willie
- Nationality: Scotland
- Born: 30 June 1833 Wallyford, East Lothian, Scotland, UK
- Died: 25 July 1903 (aged 70) Levenhall, Musselburgh, Scotland, UK
- Spouse: Susanna Law
- Children: 10

Career
- Sport: Golf
- Status: Professional

Best results in major championships (wins: 4)
- The Open Championship: Won: 1860, 1863, 1866, 1875

Achievements and awards
- World Golf Hall of Fame: 2005 (member page)

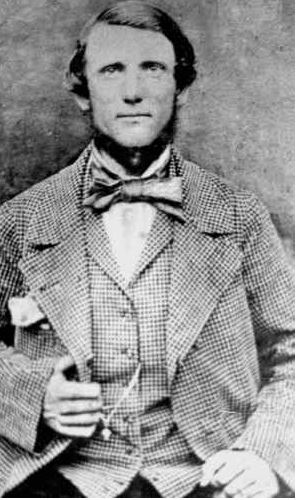
Park (c. 1867)

William Park Sr. (30 June 1833 – 25 July 1903) was a Scottish professional golfer. He was a 4-time winner of the Open Championship.

== Early life ==
Park was born in Wallyford, East Lothian, Scotland. Like some of the other early professional golfers, Park started out as a caddie. He later ran a golf equipment manufacturing business. On the course, he made his money from "challenge matches" against rivals such as Old Tom Morris, Willie Dunn and Allan Robertson, which were the most popular form of spectator golf in his era.

== Professional career ==
Park, a tall, strong man, was a very long hitter and an excellent putter, but sometimes got into trouble through overly aggressive play. He had surpassed the older Willie Dunn by age 20, and travelled to St Andrews Links to play and learn that course. He issued a public challenge in 1853 to Robertson, generally recognised as the best player, which was, however, not taken up. Custom of the time allowed the best player to refuse a challenge of this sort without damage to his reputation. Park further fuelled controversy through his aggressive self-promotion, but this did lead to increased interest in golf rivalries, more press coverage, and more matches and tournaments being set up, developing the professional game and increasing the incomes of players such as Park, Morris, and Robertson.

== Personal life ==
He married Susanna Law in Inveresk, Scotland, on 29 March 1860. The couple would have ten children.

Park's brother Mungo and his son Willie Jr. both also won the Open Championship. Mungo's victory came in 1874 and Willie Jr. had two wins, in 1887 and 1889.

== Death and legacy ==
Park died on 25 July 1903. He is primarily best remembered as the winner of four Open Championships, including the inaugural event in 1860, when the field was just eight strong. His other victories came in 1863, 1866 and 1875. Park was the co-holder of the record for most wins in the tournament until James Braid picked up his fifth win in 1910.

== Major championship ==
=== Wins (4) ===
Year	Championship	24 holes	Winning score	Margin	Runner-up
1860	The Open Championship	Not known	55-59-60=174	2 strokes	(Scotland) Tom Morris Sr.
1863	The Open Championship (2)	4 shot lead	56-54-58=168	2 strokes	(Scotland) Tom Morris Sr.
1866	The Open Championship (3)	5 shot lead	54-56-59=169	2 strokes	(Scotland) Davie Park
1875	The Open Championship (4)	1 shot deficit	56-59-51=166	2 strokes	(Scotland) Bob Martin

=== Results timeline ===
Tournament	1860	1861	1862	1863	1864	1865	1866	1867	1868	1869
The Open Championship	1	2	2	1	4	2	1	2	4	

Tournament	1870	1871	1872	1873	1874	1875	1876	1877	1878	1879
The Open Championship	6	NT			13	1	3	T8	T6	

Tournament	1880	1881	1882	1883	1884	1885	1886
The Open Championship	15	T9	T7	22			T36

- Note: Park played only in The Open Championship.
Win
Top 10
Did not play

NT = No tournament
"T" indicates a tie for a place

== See also ==
- Golf in Scotland
