= George Paxton (golfer) =

Scottish golfer

Personal information
- Nationality: Scotland
- Born: c. 1851 Musselburgh, Scotland

Career
- Sport: Golf
- Turned professional: c. 1868

Best results in major championships
- Masters Tournament: DNP
- PGA Championship: DNP
- U.S. Open: DNP
- The Open Championship: 3rd: 1874

George Paxton (born c. 1851) was a Scottish professional golfer who played during the late 19th century. Paxton took third place in the 1874 Open Championship. In total, Paxton had five top-10 performances in the Open Championship between 1874 and 1883.

== Early life ==
Paxton was born in Musselburgh, Scotland, circa 1851. He had a younger brother, Peter, who was also a professional golfer.

== Golf career ==
=== The 1874 Open Championship ===
The 1874 Open Championship was the 14th Open Championship, held 10 April at Musselburgh Links, Musselburgh, East Lothian, Scotland. The winner of the Championship was Mungo Park, by two strokes from runner-up Tom Morris, Jr. This was the first Open Championship played at Musselburgh. Paxton—who finished third—played very consistently, carding rounds of 40-40-42-40=162 and won £3 (£293.00 today).

==== Details of play ====
Play started at about 12 noon in dull and showery weather but later in the day the weather improved. The course, especially the greens, "were rather heavy".

Many of the spectators followed Tom Morris, Jr. and Willie Park, Sr. who were paired together. Morris—who got off to a rough start—experienced difficulties in extricating his ball from a number of bunkers. Park scored 40 in the first round to Morris's 42. However, as the day progressed, Morris began to find fairways and improved while Park fell away. The best player in the first two rounds was Mungo Park with scores of 37 and 38. At this stage he led by 4 from G. McCachnie, 5 from George Paxton with Tom Morris, Jr., and Willie Park had fallen a full 8 shots behind.

"During the last round the utmost excitement prevailed, and as each couple came in a knot of spectators gathered round them to ascertain what luck had attended them."

— Glasgow Herald

Mungo Park carded a third round 43 with G. McCachnie, George Paxton, Jamie Anderson and Tom Morris, Jr. each four behind at that stage. Bob Martin was a further shot behind after a third round 38. Mungo Park scored 41 in his final round and although Morris again played a useful round he still finished two behind. McCachnie fell away with a closing 47. A staff writer for the Glasgow Herald wrote, "During the last round the utmost excitement prevailed, and as each couple came in a knot of spectators gathered round them to ascertain what luck had attended them."

== Death and legacy ==
The date of death of Paxton is unknown. Paxton is best remembered for having five top-10 finishes (four of which were top-5) in the Open Championship.

== Results in The Open Championship ==
Tournament	1874	1875	1876	1877	1878	1879	1880	1881	1882	1883
The Open Championship	3		T8			4	T4			T5

Note: Paxton played only in The Open Championship.

Top 10
Did not play

"T" indicates a tie for a place
