= Jack Ferguson (golfer) =

Scottish golfer

Personal information
- Nationality: Scotland
- Born: c. 1851 Scotland

Career
- Sport: Golf
- Status: Professional

Best results in major championships
- Masters Tournament: DNP
- PGA Championship: DNP
- U.S. Open: DNP
- The Open Championship: T10: 1874

Jack Ferguson (born c. 1851) was a Scottish professional golfer who played during the late 19th century. His only top-10 finish in The Open Championship came at the 1874 Open Championship where he was tied for tenth place with James Morris and G. McCachnie.

== Early life ==
Ferguson was born in Scotland circa 1851.

== Golf career ==
=== 1874 Open Championship ===
The 1874 Open Championship was held 10 April at Musselburgh Links, Musselburgh, East Lothian, Scotland. Mungo Park won the Championship, by two strokes from runner-up Tom Morris, Jr. This was the first Open Championship played at Musselburgh. Ferguson carded rounds of 41-46-41-41=169, finishing tied for tenth place. No prize money was won by the tenth-place finishers.

== Death ==
The date of Ferguson's death is unknown.

== Results in The Open Championship ==
Tournament	1874
The Open Championship	T10

Note: Ferguson played only in The Open Championship.

Top 10

"T" indicates a tie for a place
