= William Cosgrove (golfer) =

Scottish golfer (1855–1927)

Personal information
- Nationality: Scotland
- Born: 1855 Inveresk, Scotland
- Died: 1927, aged 73 Newington, Edinburgh, Scotland

Career
- Sport: Golf
- Status: Professional

Best results in major championships
- Masters Tournament: DNP
- PGA Championship: DNP
- U.S. Open: DNP
- The Open Championship: T3: 1877

William Cosgrove (1855 – 1927) was a Scottish professional golfer who played in the late 19th century. Cosgrove had one top-10 finish in The Open Championship. His best performance was a third place tie in the 1877 Open Championship.

== Early life ==
Cosgrove was born at Inveresk, Scotland, in 1855. He was the son of Alexander Cosgrove, a maker of golf clubs, and his wife Janet Nelson. The family resided in James Place, Millhill, Inveresk. He married Mary Jane Quin in 1878 and was employed as a maker of golf balls. His cousin, Ned Cosgrove, also became a professional golfer.

== Golf career ==
=== 1877 Open Championship ===
The 1877 Open Championship was the 17th Open Championship, held 6 April at Musselburgh Links, Musselburgh, East Lothian, Scotland. Jamie Anderson won the Championship, by two strokes from runner-up Bob Pringle. Cosgrove scored rounds of 41-39-44-40=164, finishing tied for third, and won a useful £2 in prize money.

=== 1878 Open Championship ===
Cosgrove teed it up again in the 1878 Open Championship held 4 October at Prestwick Golf Club in Prestwick, South Ayrshire, Scotland. Jamie Anderson won the Championship for the second successive year, by two strokes from runner-up Bob Kirk. Cosgrove had rounds of 55-56-55=166 and finished in a tie for sixth place with Willie Park, Sr.

==== Details of play ====
Davie Strath and Bob Ferguson played together but Strath had a disappointing 45 in the first round which left him well behind the leaders. Ferguson began in disappointing fashion but managed to salvage a 40. William Brown led on 39 with Ferguson and Jamie Anderson on 40. After two rounds, three players were level on 80: Brown, Ferguson and Cosgrove with Anderson and Bob Pringle only two behind. Strath was five behind on 85.

Anderson carded a 37 in the third round while Ferguson could muster only a 40 and Davie Strath scored 38. Anderson now led on 119 with Ferguson on 120, Ferguson on 122 and Strath on 123. In the final round Strath took a horrendous 9 at the second to drop out of contention. Ferguson also had a disappointing last round and Anderson's 41 was enough to give him the Championship.

== Results in The Open Championship ==
Tournament	1874	1875	1876	1877	1878	1879	1880	1881	1882	1883	1884	1885	1886	1887	1888	1889
The Open Championship	T20			T3	T6					16	T16	T29	T20			T15

Note: Cosgrove played only in The Open Championship.

Top 10
Did not play

"T" indicates a tie for a place

== Death ==
Cosgrove died in 1927 at Newington, Edinburgh, Scotland.
