= 1879 Open Championship =

Coordinates: 56.043°N 2.823°W

Tournament information
- Dates: 27, 29 September 1879
- Location: St Andrews, Scotland
- Course: Old Course at St Andrews

Statistics
- Field: 47 players
- Prize fund: £45
- Winner's share: £10

Champion
- (Scotland) Jamie Anderson
- 169

Location in Scotland

The 1879 Open Championship was the 19th Open Championship, held 27 September at the Old Course at St Andrews, Fife, Scotland. Jamie Anderson won the Championship for the third successive time, by three strokes from Jamie Allan and Andrew Kirkaldy.

Play started at 10:00 am in fine conditions. In the first round Anderson reach the turn in 41 and his round of 84 gave him a two shot lead over Andrew Kirkaldy. In the afternoon he again reached the turn in 41. Andrew Kirkaldy and Jamie Allen were amongst the early starters and with four holes left to play it was known that Anderson needed four fives to win the Championship. He holed a long putt at the 15th and with steady play at the 16th and 17th and a four at the last he won comfortably. Allan and Kirkaldy had an 18-hole play-off two days later to decide who took the second and third place prize money.

== Final leaderboard ==
Saturday, 27 September 1879

| Place | Player | Score | Money |
|---|---|---|---|
| 1 | (Scotland) Jamie Anderson | 84-85=169 | £10 |
| T2 | (Scotland) Jamie Allan | 88-84=172 | Playoff |
| T2 | (Scotland) Andrew Kirkaldy | 86-86=172 | Playoff |
| 4 | (Scotland) George Paxton | 89-85=174 | |
| 5 | (Scotland) Tom Kidd | 87-88=175 | |
| 6 | (Scotland) Bob Ferguson | 89-87=176 | |
| 7 | (Scotland) James Morris | 92-87=179 | |
| T8 | (Scotland) Willie Fernie | 92-89=181 | |
| T8 | (Scotland) Jack Kirkaldy | 92-89=181 | |
| T8 | (Scotland) James Rennie | 93-88=181 | |

There were 15 cash prizes.

=== Playoff ===
Monday, 29 September 1879

Allan and Kirkaldy played an 18-hole play-off two days later. Kirkaldy scored 91 to Allan's 92 and took the second prize of £6, Allan taking the third prize of £5. Playoffs for other positions are mentioned but details are not known.
