= Tom Carson (golfer) =

Scottish golfer (c.1852–??)

Personal information
- Nationality: Scotland
- Born: c. 1852 Scotland

Career
- Sport: Golf
- Status: Amateur

Best results in major championships
- Masters Tournament: DNP
- PGA Championship: DNP
- U.S. Open: DNP
- The Open Championship: T7: 1875

Tom Carson (born c. 1852) was a Scottish professional golfer who played in the late 19th century. Carson tied for seventh place in the 1875 Open Championship.

== Early life ==
Carson was born in Scotland circa 1852.

== Golf career ==
=== 1875 Open Championship ===
The 1875 Open Championship was the 15th Open Championship, held 10 September at Prestwick Golf Club in Prestwick, South Ayrshire, Scotland. Willie Park, Sr. won the Championship by two strokes from runner-up Bob Martin. Willie Park, who had won the first Championship in 1860, equalled Tom Morris, Jr.'s record of four Championship wins. Carson's total was 181 and he tied for seventh place with Bob Pringle. They each won £1 in prize money.

== Death ==
Carson's date of death is unknown.
