= William Brown (golfer) =

Scottish professional golfer

Personal information
- Full name: William Brown
- Nationality: Scotland
- Born: c. 1854 Scotland

Career
- Sport: Golf
- Status: Professional

Best results in major championships
- Masters Tournament: DNP
- PGA Championship: DNP
- U.S. Open: DNP
- The Open Championship: T5: 1877

William Brown (c. 1854 – unknown) was a Scottish professional golfer who played in the late 19th century. Brown had one top-10 finish in The Open Championship. His best performance was a tie for fifth place in the 1877 Open Championship.

== Early life ==
Brown was born in Scotland, circa 1854.

== Golf career ==
The 1877 Open Championship was the 17th Open Championship, held on 6 April at Musselburgh Links, Musselburgh, East Lothian, Scotland. Jamie Anderson won the Championship, by two strokes from runner-up Bob Pringle. Brown carded rounds of 39-41-45-41=166 and finished in a tie for fifth place in the tournament and took home £1 in prize money.

Later (1885), he was secretary of the St. Andrews Golf Club.

== Death ==
Brown's date and place of death are unknown.
