= 1874 Open Championship =

Coordinates: 55.948°N 3.044°W

Tournament information
- Dates: 10 April 1874
- Location: Musselburgh, East Lothian, Scotland
- Course: Musselburgh Links

Statistics
- Field: 32 players
- Prize fund: £20
- Winner's share: £8

Champion
- (Scotland) Mungo Park
- 159

Location in Scotland

The 1874 Open Championship was the 14th Open Championship, held 10 April at Musselburgh Links, Musselburgh, East Lothian, Scotland. Mungo Park won the Championship, by two strokes from runner-up Young Tom Morris. This was the first Open Championship played at Musselburgh.

Play started at about 12 noon in dull and showery weather but later in the day the weather improved. The course, especially the greens, "were rather heavy".

Many of the spectators followed Tom Morris Jr. and Willie Park Sr. who were paired together. Morris started badly and came to grief in several bunkers. Park scored 40 in the first round to Morris's 42. However, as the day progressed, Morris improved while Park fell away. The best player in the first two rounds was Mungo Park with scores of 37 and 38. At this stage he led by 4 from G. McCachnie, 5 from George Paxton with Tom Morris Jr. and Willie Park a full 8 shots behind.

Mungo Park had a third round 43 with G. McCachnie, George Paxton, Jamie Anderson and Tom Morris Jr. each four behind at that stage. Bob Martin was a further shot behind after a third round 38. Mungo Park scored 41 in his final round and although Morris again played a useful round he still finished two behind. McCachnie fell away with a closing 47. "During the last round the utmost excitement prevailed, and as each couple came in a knot of spectators gathered round them to ascertain what luck had attended them."

== Final leaderboard ==
Friday, 10 April 1874

Place	Player	Score	Money
1	(Scotland) Mungo Park	37-38-43-41=159	£8
2	(Scotland) Tom Morris Jr.	42-41-39-39=161	£6
3	(Scotland) George Paxton	40-40-42-40=162	£3
4	(Scotland) Bob Martin	42-43-38-41=164	£1
5	(Scotland) Jamie Anderson	44-38-40-43=165	£1
T6	(Scotland) Davie Park	38-45-41-42=166	10s
T6	(Scotland) Willie Thomson	43-41-41-41=166	10s
T8	(Scotland) Bob Ferguson	42-41-42-42=167	
T8	(Scotland) Tom Kidd	43-41-43-40=167	
T10	(Scotland) Jack Ferguson	41-46-41-41=169	
T10	(Scotland) G. McCachnie	40-39-43-47=169	
T10	(Scotland) James Morris	44-44-41-40=169	
