= 1875 Open Championship =

Coordinates: 56.043°N 2.823°W

Tournament information
- Dates: 10 September 1875
- Location: Prestwick, South Ayrshire, Scotland
- Course: Prestwick Golf Club

Statistics
- Field: 18 players
- Prize fund: £21
- Winner's share: £8

Champion
- (Scotland) Willie Park Sr.
- 166

Location in Scotland

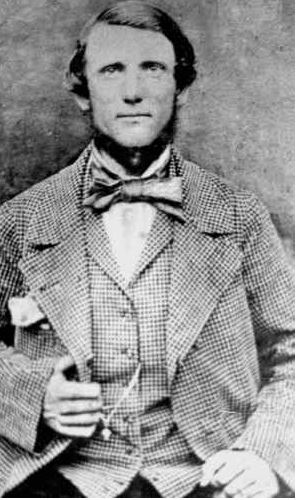
A circa 1867 photograph of Scottish professional golfer Willie Park (1833-1903).

The 1875 Open Championship was the 15th Open Championship, held 10 September at Prestwick Golf Club in Prestwick, South Ayrshire, Scotland. Willie Park Sr. won the Championship by two strokes from runner-up Bob Martin. Willie Park, who had won the first Championship in 1860, equalled Tom Morris Jr.'s record of four Championship wins.

Tom Morris Jr. and his father, Tom Morris Sr., were both absent following the death, six days earlier, of Young Tom Morris's wife during child-birth. Young Tom Morris himself died later the same year.

Play started at 11:30 a.m. and just 18 players contested the Championship. All the leading players were in the early pairings. Willie Park, in the first group, and Bob Martin, in the third group, led after the first round with scores of 60. After the second round Bob Martin and Bob Ferguson led in 114 but a number of players were close behind with Willie Park on 115 and Mungo Park on 116.

In the final round Willie Park "played a fine game" and scored 51, the best round of the day. Bob Martin came second with defending champion Mungo Park third and Bob Ferguson fourth after a 58.

== Final leaderboard ==
Friday, 10 September 1875

Place	Player	Score	Money
1	(Scotland) Willie Park Sr.	56-59-51=166	£8
2	(Scotland) Bob Martin	56-58-54=168	£5
3	(Scotland) Mungo Park	59-57-55=171	£3
4	(Scotland) Bob Ferguson	58-56-58=172	£1
5	(Scotland) James Rennie	61-59-57=177	£1
6	(Scotland) Davie Strath	59-61-58=178	£1
T7	(Scotland) Tom Carson	181	£1
T7	(Scotland) Bob Pringle	62-58-61=181	£1
T9	(Scotland) William Doleman (a)	65-59-59=183	
T9	(Scotland) Hugh Morrison	62-59-62=183	
