= G. McCachnie =

Scottish golfer

George McCachnie
Personal information
- Nationality: Scotland
- Born: c. 1851 Scotland

Career
- Sport: Golf
- Status: Professional

Best results in major championships
- Masters Tournament: DNP
- PGA Championship: DNP
- U.S. Open: DNP
- The Open Championship: T10: 1874

George McCachnie (c. 1851–?) was a Scottish professional golfer who played during the late 19th century. His only top-10 finish in The Open Championship came at the 1874 Open Championship where he was tied for tenth place with Jack Ferguson and James Morris.

== Early life ==
McCachnie was born in Scotland circa 1851.

== Golf career ==
=== 1874 Open Championship ===
McCachnie's only top-10 finish came in the 1874 Open Championship where he carded rounds of 40-39-43-47=169 and tied for tenth place with Jack Ferguson and James Morris.

== Death ==
The date of McCachnie's death is unknown.

== Results in major championships ==
Tournament	1874
The Open Championship	T10

Note: McCachnie played only in The Open Championship.

Top 10

"T" indicates a tie for a place
