= John M. Inglis =

John Milnes Inglis
- Born: 12 Jul 1878; Edinburgh, Scotland
- Died: 17 Jan 1924; Richmond, Virginia, US
- Burial place: Westview Cemetery, Atlanta, Georgia
- Occupation: Designer of golf courses

John Milne “Jock” Inglis was a Scottish-born American, known as a designer of golf courses and a member of various golf clubs and associations in the United States.

== Biography ==
Inglis was born in Edinburgh, Scotland, on July 12, 1878, according to his draft registration. His father, Adam was a liquor merchant; his mother was Margaret Milne. He emigrated to the United States in 1897, and in 1898 got a job as a greenkeeper at a country club in New York, working with golf course designer Mungo Park. After stints in Connecticut and Massachusetts, he ended up in Montgomery, Alabama, and worked on the Montgomery Country Club's golf course, developing a way to make smooth putting greens from Bermuda grass. He also started a successful business in golf clubs.

Inglis was secretary and treasurer for the Alabama Golf Association, founded 1915, and also held positions at golf clubs in Savannah, Georgia, and Richmond, Virginia. His wife was named Anna Rutherford Inglis; they had five daughters. He died, suddenly, of pneumonia, on January 17, 1924. A monument in his honor was placed at the Montgomery Country Club.
