= 1877 Open Championship =

Coordinates: 55.948°N 3.044°W

Tournament information
- Dates: 6 April 1877
- Location: Musselburgh, East Lothian, Scotland
- Course: Musselburgh Links

Statistics
- Field: 24 players
- Prize fund: £20
- Winner's share: £8

Champion
- (Scotland) Jamie Anderson
- 160

Location in Scotland

The 1877 Open Championship was the 17th Open Championship, held 6 April at Musselburgh Links, Musselburgh, East Lothian, Scotland. Jamie Anderson won the Championship, by two strokes from runner-up Bob Pringle.

Davie Strath and Bob Ferguson played together but Strath had a disappointing 45 in the first round which left him well behind the leaders. Ferguson also started badly but recovered to score 40. William Brown led on 39 with Ferguson and Jamie Anderson on 40. After two rounds, three players were level on 80: Brown, Ferguson and William Cosgrove with Anderson and Bob Pringle only two behind. Strath was five behind on 85.

Anderson scored 37 in the third round while Ferguson could only manage 40 and Davie Strath scored 38. Anderson now led on 119 with Ferguson on 120, Ferguson on 122 and Strath on 123. In the final round Strath took 9 at the second to drop out of contention. Ferguson also had a disappointing last round and Anderson's 41 was enough to give him the Championship.

== Final leaderboard ==
Friday, 6 April 1877

Place	Player	Score	Money
1	(Scotland) Jamie Anderson	40-42-37-41=160	£8
2	(Scotland) Bob Pringle	44-38-40-40=162	£6
T3	(Scotland) William Cosgrove	41-39-44-40=164	£2
T3	(Scotland) Bob Ferguson	40-40-40-44=164	£2
T5	(Scotland) William Brown	39-41-45-41=166	£1
T5	(Scotland) Davie Strath	45-40-38-43=166	£1
7	(Scotland) Mungo Park	167	

The scores of the other players are not known.
