= Hugh Morrison =

Hugh Morrison may refer to:

- Hugh Morrison (Manitoba politician) (1892–1957), Progressive Conservative member of the Legislative Assembly of Manitoba 1936–1957
- Hugh Morrison (English politician) (1868–1931), British Conservative Party Member of Parliament 1918–1923, 1924–1931
- Hugh Morrison (Northern Ireland politician), MP in the Northern Ireland Parliament for Queen's University of Belfast
- Hugh Morrison (golfer) (fl. 1875), Scottish golfer
- Hugh Morrison (weightlifter), Scottish/New Zealander weightlifter
