= 1878 Open Championship =

Coordinates: 56.043°N 2.823°W

Tournament information
- Dates: 4 October 1878
- Location: Prestwick, South Ayrshire, Scotland
- Course: Prestwick Golf Club

Statistics
- Field: 27 players
- Prize fund: Not known
- Winner's share: £8

Champion
- (Scotland) Jamie Anderson
- 157

Location in Scotland

The 1878 Open Championship was the 18th Open Championship, held 4 October at Prestwick Golf Club in Prestwick, South Ayrshire, Scotland. Jamie Anderson won the Championship for the second successive year, by two strokes from runner-up Bob Kirk.

In overcast weather with some rain, James Morris took the early lead with a first round of 50. Jamie Anderson, Bob Kirk and the English amateur John Ball each scored 53, to be three shots behind. Morris began the second round badly and finished with a 56 for a total of 106. Anderson, with a second round of 53, was tied with him, while Bob Kirk and Tom Morris Sr. were both two strokes behind.

Morris was in the third group out and had a final round 55 for a total of 161. Playing a few groups behind, Anderson began his third round with two sevens, but thereafter played steadily. With Morris finished he was told that he needed to play the last four holes in 17 to tie with Morris. At the Burn Hole (the 9th) he holed a full iron shot for a three, followed this with a four at the 10th, and at the Short Hole (the 11th) his tee shot landed on top of the hill behind the green. The ball then ran down the hill and into the hole for a hole-in-one. A five at the last gave him a round of 51 and a total of 157. Bob Kirk, playing in the last group, was still in contention. On the last green he was told that if he holed his long putt he would tie Anderson. The putt lipped out and he missed the return putt but his score of 159 was enough to give him second place.

== Final leaderboard ==
Friday, 4 October 1878

Place	Player	Score	Money
1	(Scotland) Jamie Anderson	53-53-51=157	£8
2	(Scotland) Bob Kirk	53-55-51=159	£5
3	(Scotland) James Morris	50-56-55=161	£3
T4	(England) John Ball (a)	53-57-55=165	Playoff
T4	(Scotland) Bob Martin	57-53-55=165	Playoff
T6	(Scotland) William Cosgrove	55-56-55=166	
T6	(Scotland) Willie Park Sr.	53-56-57=166	
8	(Scotland) Jamie Allan	62-53-52=167	
T9	(Scotland) John Allan	55-55-58=168	
T9	(Scotland) Tom Dunn	54-60-54=168	

=== Playoff ===
Friday, 4 October 1878

Ball and Martin had a 12-hole playoff later the same day. Martin scored 55 to Ball's 64 and took fourth place.
