= Jamie Allan (golfer) =

Scottish professional golfer (1861–1900)

Personal information
- Full name: James Allan
- Nationality: Scotland
- Born: 28 August 1861 Prestwick, Ayrshire, Scotland
- Died: 8 August 1900 (aged 38) Wimbledon, Surrey, England

Career
- Sport: Golf
- Status: Professional

Best results in major championships
- Masters Tournament: DNP
- PGA Championship: DNP
- U.S. Open: DNP
- The Open Championship: T2: 1879

James Allan (28 August 1861 – 8 August 1900) was a Scottish professional golfer who played in the late 19th century. Allan was a runner-up in the 1879 Open Championship.

== Early life ==
Allan was born in Prestwick, Scotland on 28 August 1861, the son of Hugh and Mary Allan. Two of his older brothers, John (c. 1847–1897) and Matthew (1858–1890) were also professional golfers.

== Golf career ==
Allan served as a professional at Royal North Devon Golf Club in Westward Ho!, Devon, England. He possessed a knack for lofting his golf ball, a skill that he demonstrated on occasion to the Royal North Devon members. It is unclear what the trick entailed. It is surmised that he was able to hit a shot much higher than was thought possible with the pitching clubs in use at the time.

By the time Allan played in his first Open Championship at Prestwick in 1878, he had already joined his brother John in Devon. Allan had a poor first round of 62, leaving him 12 behind the leader. Further rounds of 53 and 52 left him in eighth place, 10 strokes behind Jamie Anderson.

In August 1879, Allan played a series of four matches against Bob Kirk for stakes totalling £200. The matches were played at Royal North Devon Golf Club, Royal Liverpool Golf Club, Prestwick Golf Club and on the Old Course at St Andrews. £25 was at stake for each match with a further £100 for the overall winner. The first match was played on 13 August at North Devon. Allan was four holes up after the morning round and won by seven holes after the second round. At Royal Liverpool, the match started even with the pair level after nine holes. However Allan led by four holes at the end of the round and eventually won by 14 holes. At Prestwick, Allan won by six holes, increasing his overall lead to 27. The final match was played at St Andrews on 28 August. Allan won five of the first six holes to win the overall match 32 & 30. Allan led by nine holes after the first round and Kirk conceded the match. In the afternoon, Allan played a match against James Morris, winning 6 & 5.

The 1879 Open Championship was the 19th Open Championship, held 27 September at the Old Course at St Andrews, Fife, Scotland. Allan shot rounds of 88 and 84 for a total of 172. Jamie Anderson won the Championship for the third successive time, by three strokes from Allan and Andrew Kirkaldy. Allan and Kirkaldy had an 18-hole play-off two days later to decide who took the second and third place prize money. Kirkaldy scored 91 to Allan's 92 and took the second prize of £6, Allan taking the third prize of £5.

After the championship, Allan played another series of four matches, similar to those he had played against Bob Kirk in August, but this time against the new champion, Jamie Anderson. As in the previous match, stakes totalled £200. The matches were played on the Old Course at St Andrews, Prestwick Golf Club, Royal Liverpool Golf Club and finally at Royal North Devon Golf Club. Anderson won three of the matches with Allan winning at Royal Liverpool. Allan was defeated in the overall match by 8 & 7. The first match was played on 30 September at St Andrews the day after the championship playoff. Anderson was five up after the morning round and eventually won by two holes. In the second match at Prestwick Allan was one up after the first 12-hole round. He increased his lead to four holes after 8 holes of the second round but lost the last 4 holes to leave the match level. Anderson won the first round by three holes to win the match. In the third match at Hoylake Anderson led by three after the first round but Allen came back and won the match by a single hole. At Westward Ho! on 24 October, Anderson led by three holes after the first round. He won the overall matches 8 & 7 after 11 holes of the second round and, later, the individual match by 5 & 3.

Allan left Royal North Devon in the mid-1880s returning to Scotland.

== Death ==
Allan died on 8 August 1900 in Wimbledon, Surrey after a long illness.

== Results in major championships ==
Tournament	1878	1879	1880	1881	1882	1883	1884	1885	1886	1887	1888	1889
The Open Championship	8	T2						T29	T33		T18	?

Note: Allan only played in The Open Championship.

Top 10
Did not play

? = played, finish unknown
"T" indicates a tie for a place
