= Hugh Morrison (golfer) =

Scottish golfer (c.1852–??)

Personal information
- Nationality: Scotland
- Born: c. 1852 Scotland

Career
- Sport: Golf
- Status: Amateur

Best results in major championships
- Masters Tournament: DNP
- PGA Championship: DNP
- U.S. Open: DNP
- The Open Championship: T9: 1875

Hugh Morrison (born c. 1852) was a Scottish professional golfer who played in the late 19th century. Morrison tied for ninth place in the 1875 Open Championship.

== Early life ==
Morrison was born in Scotland circa 1852. Little is known about his life other than his ninth place finish in the 1875 Open Championship.

== Golf career ==
=== 1875 Open Championship ===
The 1875 Open Championship was the 15th Open Championship, held 10 September at Prestwick Golf Club in Prestwick, South Ayrshire, Scotland. Willie Park, Sr. won the Championship by two strokes from runner-up Bob Martin. Willie Park, who had won the first Championship in 1860, equalled Tom Morris, Jr.'s record of four Championship wins. Morrison had rounds of 62-59-62=183 but won no prize money for his effort.

== Death ==
Morrison's date of death is unknown.
