= James Rennie (golfer) =

Scottish golfer (c.1826–1924)

Personal information
- Nationality: Scotland
- Born: c. 1826 Scotland
- Died: 1924 Scotland

Career
- Sport: Golf
- Status: Professional

Best results in major championships
- Masters Tournament: DNP
- PGA Championship: DNP
- U.S. Open: DNP
- The Open Championship: 5th: 1875

James Rennie (c. 1826–1924) was a Scottish professional golfer who played in the late 19th century. Rennie had three top-10 finishes in the Open Championship, his best effort being fifth in the 1875 Open Championship.

== Early life ==
Rennie was born in Scotland circa 1826.

== Golf career ==
=== 1875 Open Championship ===
The 1875 Open Championship was the 15th Open Championship, held 10 September at Prestwick Golf Club in Prestwick, South Ayrshire, Scotland. Willie Park, Sr. won the Championship by two strokes from runner-up Bob Martin. Willie Park, who had won the first Championship in 1860, equalled Tom Morris, Jr.'s record of four Championship wins. Rennie had rounds of 61-59-57=177 and won £1 in prize money.

== Death ==
Rennie died in 1924.

== Results in The Open Championship ==
Tournament	1875	1876	1877	1878	1879	1880	1881	1882	1883	1884	1885
The Open Championship	5				T8			T7			T18

Note: Rennie played only in The Open Championship.

Top 10
Did not play

"T" = tied for a place
