= Bob Pringle (golfer) =

Scottish golfer

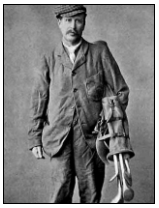
- Scottish golfer Bob Pringle, shown holding his clubs c. 1875 Pringle holding his clubs, c. 1875

Personal information
- Nationality: Scotland
- Born: 1851 Dalkeith, Scotland
- Died: 8 September 1902, aged 51-52 Inveresk, Scotland

Career
- Sport: Golf
- Turned professional: c. 1869
- Professional wins: 1

Best results in major championships
- Masters Tournament: DNP
- PGA Championship: DNP
- U.S. Open: DNP
- The Open Championship: 2nd: 1877

Robert Pringle (1851 – 8 September 1902) was a Scottish professional golfer who played in the late 19th century. Pringle had four top-10 finishes in The Open Championship. His best performance was second place in the 1877 Open Championship.

== Early life ==
Pringle was born in Dalkeith, Scotland, in 1851. He was the son of David Pringle and his wife Mary Hilston. He learned golf by starting out as a caddie. Pringle was described as having an admirable swing, one that was technically correct and aesthetically pleasing to see. He was said to be a great stylist of the day, in the manner of Harry Vardon.

In October 1874, Pringle stunned a strong field in a four-round tournament on the Musselburgh Links. His success in winning the tournament was described in a magazine article at the time as "the whole of the 'cracks' had been vanquished by a hitherto unknown caddie, named Pringle."

== Golf career ==
=== 1877 Open Championship ===
Pringle's best result as a player came in the 1877 Open Championship held 6 April at Musselburgh Links, Musselburgh, East Lothian, Scotland. Pringle played solid golf but Jamie Anderson won the Championship by two strokes. Pringle finished in second place, carding rounds of 44-38-40-40=162, and won £6.

==== Details of play ====
Davie Strath and Bob Ferguson played together but Strath had a disappointing 45 in the first round which left him well behind the leaders. Ferguson, too, began in disappointing fashion but managed to salvage a 40. William Brown led on 39 with Ferguson and Jamie Anderson on 40. After two rounds, three players were level on 80: Brown, Ferguson and William Cosgrove with Anderson and Pringle only two behind. Strath was five behind on 85.

Anderson carded a 37 in the third round while Ferguson could muster only a 40 and Davie Strath scored 38. Anderson now led on 119 with Ferguson on 120 and Strath on 123. In the final round Strath took a horrendous 9 at the second hole to drop out of contention. Ferguson also had a disappointing last round and Anderson's 41 was enough to give him the Championship.

== Death ==
Pringle died on 8 September 1902. A "nervous affliction" affected one of his hands, ending his playing career. He died in poverty at the Inveresk poorhouse.

== Tournament wins (1) ==
Note: This list may be incomplete.

- 1874 Musselburgh Tournament

== Results in The Open Championship ==
Tournament	1873	1874	1875	1876	1877	1878	1879	1880	1881	1882	1883	1884	1885	1886	1887	1888	1889
The Open Championship	20	T14	T7		2	22		T4		T23	4			T16			RET

Note: Pringle played only in The Open Championship.

Top 10
Did not play

RET = retired
"T" indicates a tie for a place
