= James Morris (golfer) =

Scottish professional golfer (1856–1906)

Personal information
- Full name: James Ogilvy Fairlie Morris
- Nationality: Scotland
- Born: 8 January 1856 Prestwick, Scotland
- Died: 8 April 1906 (aged 50) St Andrews, Scotland

Career
- Sport: Golf
- Status: Professional

Best results in major championships
- Masters Tournament: DNP
- PGA Championship: DNP
- U.S. Open: DNP
- The Open Championship: 3rd: 1878

James Ogilvy Fairlie Morris (8 January 1856 – 8 April 1906) was a Scottish professional golfer. Morris had multiple top-10 finishes in The Open Championship, including a third-place finish in the 1878 event held at Prestwick Golf Club in Prestwick, South Ayrshire, Scotland. He was the son of Tom Morris, Sr., also known as Old Tom Morris, and was named after James Ogilvie Fairlie, a mentor and patron of his father. He died in 1906 aged 50 of heart failure, unmarried.

== Early life ==
Morris was born on 8 January 1856 in Prestwick, Scotland. At age 22 he was entered to play in the 1878 Open Championship. At such a young age he was already an experienced tournament player having entered at least two prior Open Championship tournaments. In 1873 and 1874 he had finished tied for 11th and 10th place, respectively. He was the son of Tom Morris, Sr. and most assuredly learned the finer points of the game from his father.

== 1878 Open Championship ==
=== Details of play ===
In overcast weather with some rain, Morris took the early lead with a first round of 50. Jamie Anderson, Bob Kirk, and the English amateur John Ball, each scored 53 to be three shots behind. Morris began the second round badly and finished with a 56 for a total of 106. Anderson, with a second round of 53, was tied with him, while Bob Kirk and Tom Morris, Sr. were both two strokes behind.

James Morris was in the third group out and had a final round 55 for a total of 161. Playing a few groups behind, Anderson began his third round with two sevens, but thereafter played steadily. With Morris finished, Anderson was told that he needed to play the last four holes in 17 to tie with Morris.

At the Burn Hole (the 9th) Anderson holed—in spectacular fashion—a full iron shot for a three, followed that magnificent shot with a four at the 10th, and at the Short Hole (the 11th) his tee shot landed on top of the hill behind the green. The ball then ran down the hill and into the hole for a hole-in-one. A five at the last gave him a round of 51 and a total of 157. Bob Kirk, playing in the last group, was still in contention however his putt to tie Anderson lipped out and he missed the return putt. Fortunately Kirk's score of 159 was still good enough to give him second place. Morris finished in third place.

== Family ==
He was the son of Old Tom Morris and was named after James Ogilvie Fairlie. He was the brother of Young Tom Morris.

== Death ==
Morris died on 8 April 1906 at the age of 50 at St Andrews, Scotland, due to heart failure. He never married.

== Results in The Open Championship ==
Tournament	1873	1874	1875	1876	1877	1878	1879	1880	1881	1882	1883	1884	1885	1886	1887	1888
The Open Championship	T11	T10	DNP	?	?	3	7	DNP	?	DNP	DNP	T13	T9	11	DNP	T23

Note: Morris played only in The Open Championship.

DNP = Did not play
? = played, finish unknown
"T" indicates a tie for a place
Yellow background for top-10
