= Musselburgh Links =

Golf course in Musselburgh, Scotland

Musselburgh Links, The Old Golf Course
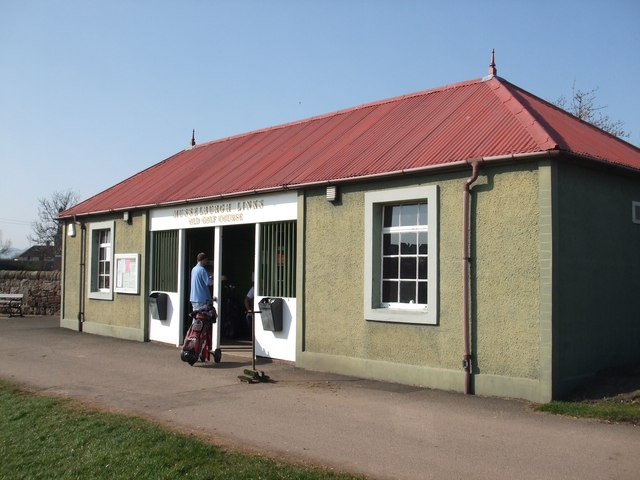
- Old Starters Building (A new starters building was built in 2011).

- Location within Scotland
- 55°56′48″N 3°2′11″W

Club information
- Type: Public
- Operator: East Lothian Council
- Total holes: 9
- Tournaments: The Open Championship (six times between 1874 and 1889)
- Website: musselburgholdlinks.co.uk
- Par: 34

Musselburgh Links, The Old Golf Course in Musselburgh, East Lothian, Scotland, is one of the oldest golf courses in the world. The course is not to be confused with The Royal Musselburgh Golf Club or the Levenhall Links.

Musselburgh Links is a publicly owned course, administered by East Lothian Council. Two golf clubs, Musselburgh Old Course Golf Club and Musselburgh Links Ladies Golf Club, are based at the course. The course has nine holes, and is a par 34.

== History ==
Musselburgh was once certified as being the oldest golf course in the world by Guinness World Records; recently this 'record' was reassigned to St Andrews. There is documented evidence that golf was played at the links in 1672, while it is claimed that Mary, Queen of Scots, played nearby (at Seton) in 1567.

Musselburgh Links was originally seven holes, with an 8th added in 1838 and the 9th in 1870.

Musselburgh was one of the three courses which staged The Open Championship in rotation in the 1870s and 1880s, alongside Prestwick and the Old Course at St Andrews. It was selected because it was used by the Honourable Company of Edinburgh Golfers, and the course hosted six Opens in all, the first in 1874 and the last in 1889.

Year	Winner (Note: Superscript number beside the player's name is the number of the Open Championship in their respective careers.)	Score		
Year	Winner	R1	R2	Total
1874	(Scotland) Mungo Park ^{1st}	75	84	159
1877	(Scotland) Jamie Anderson ^{1st}	82	78	160
1880	(Scotland) Bob Ferguson ^{1st}	81	81	162
1883	(Scotland) Willie Fernie ^{1st}	75	83	158 ^{PO}
1886	(Scotland) David Brown ^{1st}	79	78	157
1889	(Scotland) Willie Park, Jr. ^{2nd}	78	77	155 ^{PO}

When the Honorable Company built a private club at Muirfield, Musselburgh dropped out of the rotation for the Open.

On 14 July 2010, the course became a temporary heliport, when fog in Edinburgh forced the helicopter used by Elizabeth II and Prince Philip, Duke of Edinburgh to land in front of the first tee.

== Legacy ==
The course left a lasting legacy to the game's rules. The four-and-a-quarter-inch (108 mm) diameter of a golf hole was the width of the implement used to cut the holes at Musselburgh; in 1893, the Royal and Ancient adopted the measurement as a mandatory requirement for all courses.
