= Mungo Park (golfer) =

Scottish golfer (1836–1904)

Personal information
- Nationality: Scotland
- Born: 22 October 1836 Musselburgh, Scotland
- Died: 19 June 1904 (aged 67) Inveresk, Scotland
- Spouse: Margaret Johnston

Career
- Sport: Golf
- Status: Professional

Best results in major championships (wins: 1)
- The Open Championship: Won: 1874

Mungo Park (22 October 1836 – 19 June 1904) was a member of a famous family of Scottish golfers. He won the 1874 Open Championship held at Musselburgh Links.

== Early life ==
Park was born 22 October 1836 to farm labourer and occasional golfer. James Park (1797–1873) and his wife Euphemia (née Kerr; 1806–1860), at Quarry Houses in Musselburgh, which was to become one of the three towns that shared hosting responsibilities for The Open Championship through the 1870s and 1880s. He learned golf at the age of four, but then spent 20 years as a seaman.

== Golf career ==
After his career as a seaman concluded he returned to his home town in the early 1870s and won the 1874 Open Championship on the Musselburgh Links. His winning score was 159 for 36 holes. He spent his later life working as a teacher, golf course designer and clubmaker. Park would go on to post four more top-10 finishes in The Open Championship between 1875 and 1881.

=== Golf course design ===
Park was the first club professional at Alnmouth Golf Club and it is believed by those associated with the club that he was also responsible for the design of the course. Park was also the first professional at Portmarnock Golf Club for one year having supervised the golf course design in 1893.

== Personal life ==
Park's brother, Willie, and his nephew, Willie Park, Jr., both won The Open Championship.

Mungo Park had a nephew, Mungo Park Jr., Willie Jr.'s younger brother, who was also a professional golfer. Mungo Jr. spent some time in Argentina and won the Argentine Open three times, in 1905, 1907 and 1912.

Park died of pernicious anemia in the Inveresk poorhouse, aged 67.

== Major championships ==
=== Wins (1) ===
Year	Championship	18 holes	Winning score	Margin	Runner-up
1874	The Open Championship	4 shot lead	75-84=159	2 strokes	(Scotland) Tom Morris, Jr.

=== Results timeline ===
Tournament	1874	1875	1876	1877	1878	1879	1880	1881	1882	1883	1884	1885	1886
The Open Championship	1	3	T4	7	17		20	T9		27		WD	T33

Note: Park played only in the Open Championship.

Win
Top 10
Did not play

WD = Withdrew
"T" indicates a tie for a place
