= Jamie Anderson (golfer) =

Scottish professional golfer (1842–1905)

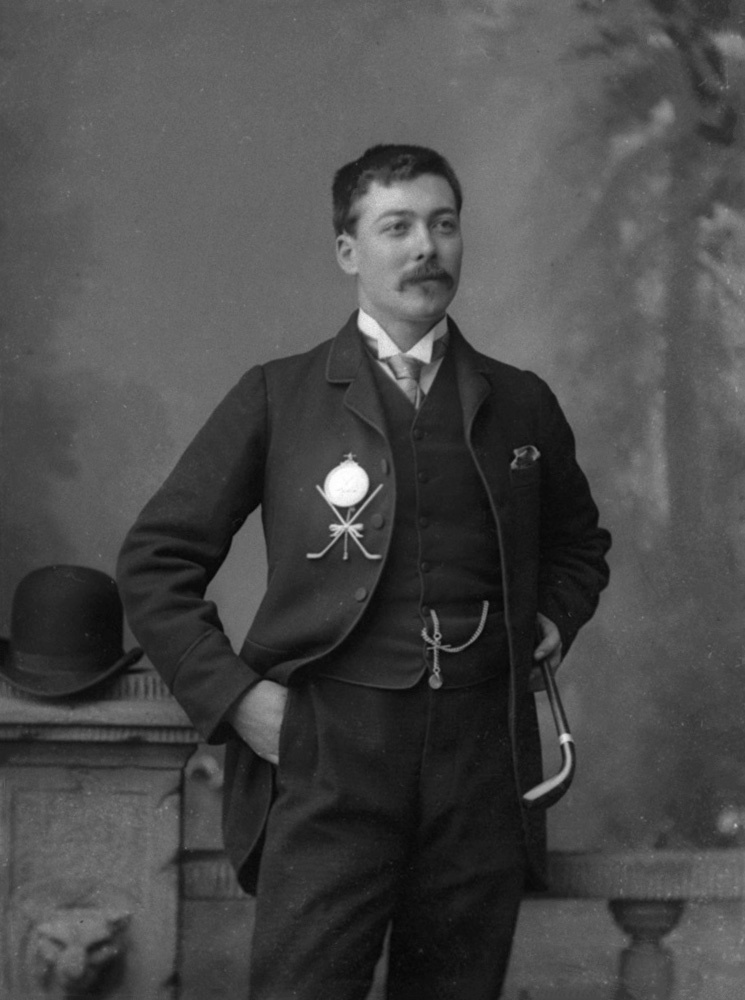
- Anderson in formal attire, c. 1877

Personal information
- Full name: James Anderson
- Nickname: Jamie
- Nationality: Scotland
- Born: 27 June 1842 St. Andrews, Scotland
- Died: 16 August 1905 (aged 63) Thornton, Fife, Scotland
- Spouse: Janet Clements Armit
- Children: Jane, David, Margaret, Mary, Elizabeth, James, William, David, Janet, Helen, John

Career
- Sport: Golf
- Status: Professional

Best results in major championships (wins: 3)
- The Open Championship: Won: 1877, 1878, 1879

James Anderson (27 June 1842 – 16 August 1905) was a nineteenth-century professional golfer who won The Open Championship three consecutive times, from 1877 to 1879.

== Early life ==
Anderson was born in St Andrews, Scotland, the son of David "Da" Anderson, greenskeeper at the Old Course. Da also sold tea and lemonade on the Old Course from a portable cart. James Anderson began caddying over the Old Course from a young age, while Allan Robertson was still alive, and took up golf around the same time. It took James many years to reach his top championship form (age 35), in contrast to the nine-years-younger Young Tom Morris, who won his first Open at age 17 in 1868.

== Golf career ==
Anderson's Open Championships victories were at Musselburgh in 1877; Prestwick Golf Club in 1878; and St Andrews in 1879. He is one of only four golfers who have won three consecutive Opens, alongside Young Tom Morris (1868–1870), Bob Ferguson (1880–82) and Peter Thomson (1954–56). Anderson did not compete in 1880 because the date of the tournament was set so late that he missed entry. He was runner-up the next year 1881. His nephew David was runner-up in 1888, and all of his sons were golf professionals.

== Death and legacy ==
Anderson died in a poorhouse in Thornton, Fife, Scotland. He won the Open Championship three consecutive times: 1877, 1878, and 1879.

== Major championships ==
=== Wins (3) ===
Year	Championship	18/24 holes	Winning score	Margin	Runner(s)-up
1877	The Open Championship	2 shot deficit	40-42-37-41=160	2 strokes	(Scotland) Bob Pringle
1878	The Open Championship (2)	Tied for lead	53-53-51=157	2 strokes	(Scotland) Bob Kirk
1879	The Open Championship (3)	2 shot lead	84-85=169	3 strokes	(Scotland) Jamie Allan, (Scotland) Andrew Kirkaldy

=== Results timeline ===
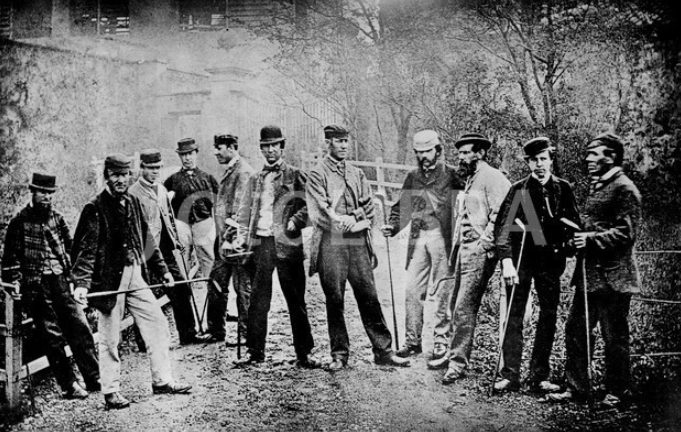
Anderson (4th from left) at the Leith Links Tournament in 1867

Tournament	1869	1870	1871	1872	1873	1874	1875	1876	1877	1878	1879
The Open Championship	4	7	NT		2	5		T12	1	1	1

Tournament	1880	1881	1882	1883	1884	1885	1886	1887	1888
The Open Championship		2	T3		15			T28	T32

- Note: Anderson played only in The Open Championship.
Win
Top 10
Did not play

NT = No tournament
"T" indicates a tie for a place
