= 1889 Open Championship =

Coordinates: 55.948°N 3.044°W

Tournament information
- Dates: 8, 11 November 1889
- Location: Musselburgh, East Lothian, Scotland
- Course: Musselburgh Links

Statistics
- Field: 48 players
- Prize fund: £22
- Winner's share: £8

Champion
- (Scotland) Willie Park Jr.
- 155, playoff

Location in Scotland

The 1889 Open Championship was the 29th Open Championship, held 8 November at the Musselburgh Links, Musselburgh, East Lothian, Scotland. Andrew Kirkaldy and Willie Park Jr. were tied on 155 each. They had a 36-hole playoff on 11 November, Park winning by five strokes from Kirkaldy. This was the sixth and last time the Open was played at Musselburgh. It was replaced by Muirfield as the venue for the 1892 Open Championship.

A number of players scored 39 in the first round but after two round Kirkaldy had the lead with a total of 77. Park was a stroke behind on 78 with Ben Sayers on 79. After the third round, Kirkaldy and Park drew clear of the field, Kirkaldy still holding a one stroke lead. Kirkaldy led by two after Park made a bad start to the final round. However Kirkaldy finished badly, taking four at the short 7th and 9th holes while Park took three at the two holes and so the two player were tied on 155, four clear of Sayers.

Play started until 10:30 a.m. "but as the day wore on it became apparent that an earlier start would have been more satisfactory". The problems with playing on a nine-hole course in November became clear and players not in contention were offered 5 shillings not to play in the final round so that the leading players could finish before darkness descended. As it was, the last few competitors played in the dark.

The playoff took place three days later. Park got off to the best start in the playoff and led by four after the first round. However, in the second round Park was in trouble at the 3rd hole where he had to lift, taking a two stroke penalty, and taking eight. Park was in more trouble at the next two holes and Kirkaldy took a one stroke lead at that point. However, Park played the last four holes four strokes better than Kirkaldy and finished the morning play with a three-shot lead. After an hour break and in front of about a thousand spectators both played an excellent third round, Park scoring 37 to Kirkaldy's 38, so that Park now led by four strokes. Kirkaldy reduced the lead to three at the first hole of the final round but then they halved the next six holes. The championship was finally decided at the 8th where Kirkaldy was bunkered and took six.

Park's win marked the end of Scottish hegemony at the Open Championship. His victory was the 29th consecutive victory for Scottish golfers. The streak was broken the next year at the 1890 Open Championship by Englishman John Ball. In general, golfers from Jersey and England would dominate the Open in the 1890s, winning eight of the ten events.

This streak of 29 consecutive major championship victories (none of the other major championships existed yet) from one nation remains the longest ever. The next closest is 17 consecutive victories from American golfers that ended at the 1947 U.S. Open.

== Final leaderboard ==
Friday, 8 November 1889

| Place | Player | Score | Money |
|---|---|---|---|
| T1 | (Scotland) Andrew Kirkaldy | 39-38-39-39=155 | Playoff |
| T1 | (Scotland) Willie Park Jr. | 39-39-39-38=155 | Playoff |
| 3 | (Scotland) Ben Sayers | 39-40-41-39=159 | £3 |
| T4 | (Scotland) David Brown | 43-39-41-39=162 | £3 |
| T4 | (Scotland) Johnny Laidlay (a) | 42-39-40-41=162 | − |
| 6 | (Scotland) Willie Fernie | 45-39-40-40=164 | £1 |
| T7 | (Scotland) Willie Brown | 44-43-41-37=165 | 13s 4d |
| T7 | (Scotland) Willie Campbell | 44-40-42-39=165 | 13s 4d |
| T7 | (Scotland) Davie Grant | 41-41-41-42=165 | 13s 4d |
| T10 | (Scotland) Hugh Kirkaldy | 44-39-43-40=166 | − |
| T10 | (Scotland) Willie Thomson | 43-42-40-41=166 | − |

=== Playoff ===
Monday, 11 November 1889

| Place | Player | Score | Money |
|---|---|---|---|
| 1 | (Scotland) Willie Park Jr. | 39-43-37-39=158 | £8 |
| 2 | (Scotland) Andrew Kirkaldy | 43-42-38-40=163 | £5 |

=== Scorecards ===
Morning rounds

| Hole | 1 | 2 | 3 | 4 | 5 | 6 | 7 | 8 | 9 | 1st | 1 | 2 | 3 | 4 | 5 | 6 | 7 | 8 | 9 | 2nd | Total |
|---|---|---|---|---|---|---|---|---|---|---|---|---|---|---|---|---|---|---|---|---|---|
| (Scotland) Park | 4 | 5 | 5 | 5 | 4 | 5 | 3 | 4 | 4 | 39 | 5 | 5 | 8 | 6 | 5 | 4 | 4 | 3 | 3 | 43 | 82 |
| (Scotland) Kirkaldy | 5 | 5 | 6 | 4 | 5 | 7 | 3 | 5 | 3 | 43 | 5 | 5 | 6 | 4 | 4 | 6 | 4 | 4 | 4 | 42 | 85 |

Afternoon rounds

| Hole | 1 | 2 | 3 | 4 | 5 | 6 | 7 | 8 | 9 | 3rd | 1 | 2 | 3 | 4 | 5 | 6 | 7 | 8 | 9 | 4th | Total |
|---|---|---|---|---|---|---|---|---|---|---|---|---|---|---|---|---|---|---|---|---|---|
| (Scotland) Park | 4 | 6 | 4 | 4 | 5 | 5 | 3 | 3 | 3 | 37 | 5 | 5 | 4 | 4 | 5 | 5 | 4 | 4 | 3 | 39 | 76 |
| (Scotland) Kirkaldy | 5 | 5 | 4 | 4 | 5 | 5 | 3 | 4 | 3 | 38 | 4 | 5 | 4 | 4 | 5 | 5 | 4 | 6 | 3 | 40 | 78 |
