= James Kay (golfer) =

Scottish golfer (c. 1855–1927)

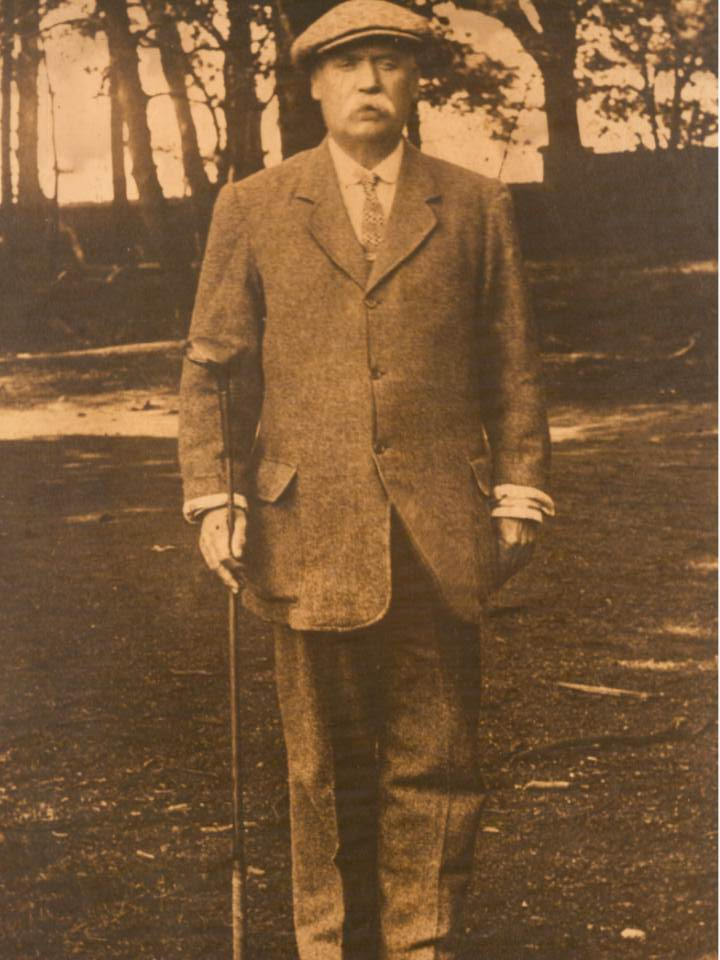
- James Kay, c. 1924

Personal information
- Nickname: Jimmy
- Nationality: Scotland
- Born: c. 1855 Leith, Scotland
- Died: 18 April 1927 (aged 72) Seaton Carew, County Durham, England

Career
- Sport: Golf
- Status: Professional

Best results in major championships
- Masters Tournament: DNP
- PGA Championship: DNP
- U.S. Open: DNP
- The Open Championship: T5: 1892

James Kay (c. 1855 – 18 April 1927) was a Scottish professional golfer who played during the late 19th century and early 20th century. He served as the head professional at Seaton Carew Golf Club from 1886 to 1926, a remarkable 40 years of service. He had two top-10 finishes in the Open Championship. His son Andrew was also a professional golfer.

== 1892 Open Championship ==
Kay placed tied for 5th place in the 1892 Open Championship. The 1892 Open Championship was the 32nd Open Championship, held 22–23 September at Muirfield in Gullane, East Lothian, Scotland. Harold Hilton, an amateur, won the Championship by three strokes from another amateur, John Ball, and two professionals—Sandy Herd and Hugh Kirkaldy. This was the second win by an amateur following Ball's victory in 1890.

== Career at Seaton Carew Golf Club ==
Very few golf clubs can claim to have had a golfing legend as their long-term professional, but an exceptional example is that of Seaton Carew Golf Club where Kay served as the head professional for a remarkable 40 years.

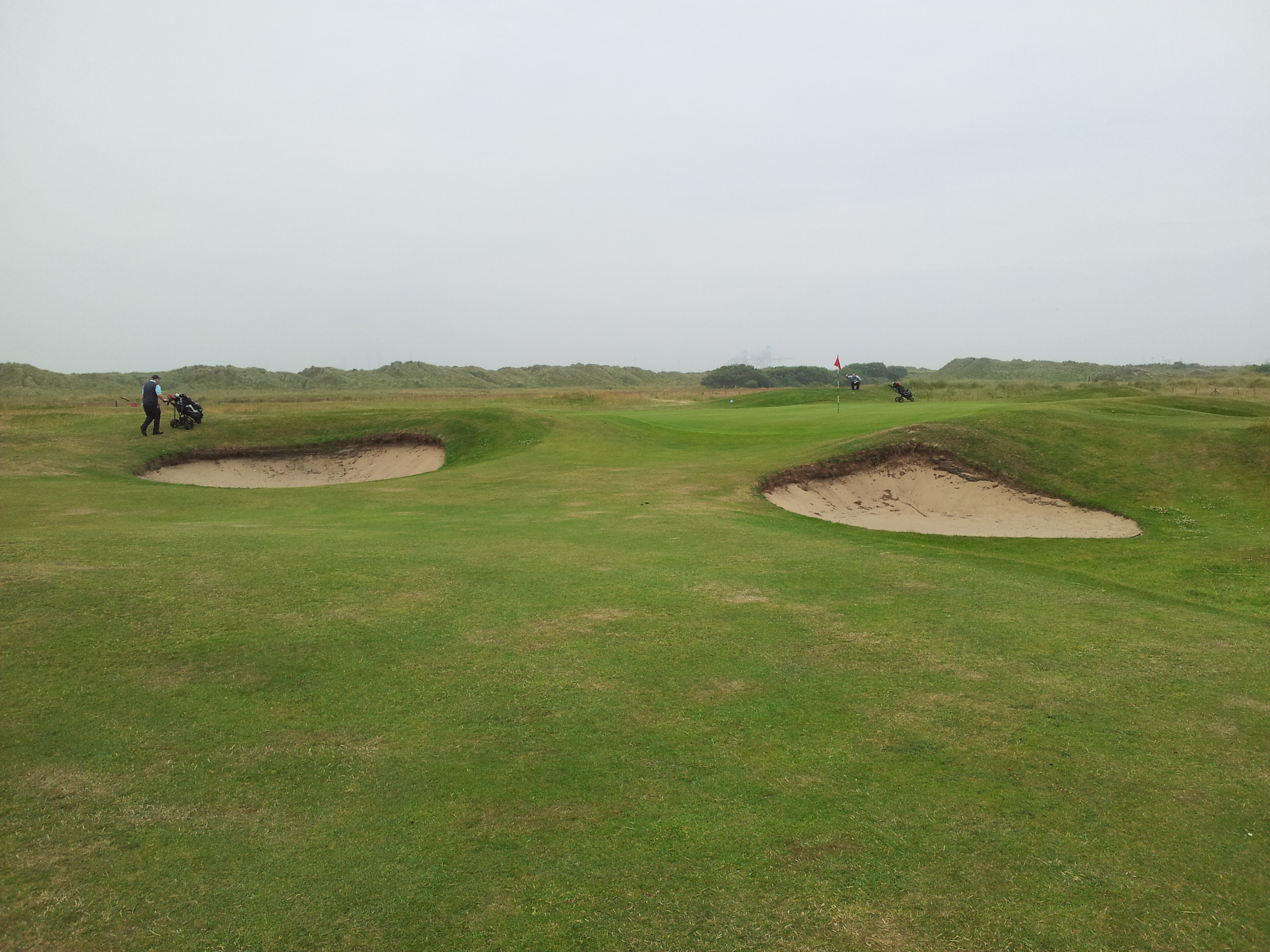
"Jimmy Kay" par 4 hole named after club professional James Kay who played in 22 Open Championships.

Kay, born in Lieth, Scotland in 1855, was engaged by Seaton Carew as their professional on 1 May 1886 following the resignation of Tom Park, a member of the famous Park Scottish golfing family. It was Kay's playing record that elevated him above his peers. Press reports of the time show that Kay played in a total of 22 Open Championships, qualifying in 20 and twice finishing in the top six in the 1892 Open at Muirfield and 1893 Open at Prestwick. On 8 June 1908 he also represented his homeland when he played for Scotland in an international match against England at Prestwick Golf Club.

In May 1909—at the age of 53—Kay won the Leeds Cup, a tournament for professional golfers; this is currently the oldest tournament in professional golf worldwide. It was presented to the Professional Golf Association on its formation in 1901 by Alderman Penrose-Green, Lord Mayor of Leeds and President of Leeds Golf Club to be competed for annually by professional golfers. The first competition was held in 1902 at Leeds Golf Club and Kay was one of its earliest winners. Contemporaries record that Kay was "a veritable demon on the green and extremely adept at laying a stymie and therefore as might be guessed was a very fine match player."

Kay played in an era when most of golf's professional players made their money through "money matches" and this was where Kay came into his own especially when playing against the top golfers of his era. His most notable matches are his performances against the Great Triumvirate of golf. J. H.Taylor, James Braid and Harry Vardon. Many of these memorable matches being reported in newspaper articles of the day that are in the club's historical archive. In 1895 Kay defeated the then Open Champion, Taylor, who had just retained his prestigious title on the Old Course at St Andrews. The match, over 36 holes, took place on 16 June and although the respective scores were equal, James Kay beat his illustrious opponent by one hole.

On 22 September 1900, Kay exacted a similar outcome on Braid, although at that time Braid hadn't yet recorded any of his five Open Championship victories. Vardon was the only member of the Great Triumvirate to actually get the better of Kay on his home course, when he won 6 and 5 on 8 September 1898. In August 1898, Kay—in an Open Professional tournament at Earlsferry and Elie links—was second only to Vardon, then Open Champion, beating all other leading professionals including Braid, Taylor, Herd and Kirkaldy. But, eventually around the time of his Leeds Cup win, Kay exacted his revenge on Vardon in an exhibition match at Whitby, defeating Vardon by two holes in a 36-hole exhibition match. Not that these money matches were played in anything but the spirit of friendly rivalry as can be detected by Vardon's comment in his 1905 book "The Complete Golfer" where he tells how advice from his friend James Kay of Seaton Carew helped him win the 1896 Open Championship.

Given such a remarkable playing record it's not surprising that Kay was held in great esteem by the club's members, and on 20 July 1911 the Committee agreed to mark the great man's service of 25 years. A total of £23.8s.6d was raised by subscription and a tea and coffee service was presented to him at the club's annual general meeting. Some 14 years later the committee had more serious matters to contemplate, namely James Kay's retirement, but the matter was deferred for a further 12 months. On 9 December 1926, after long and serious discussion, it was finally resolved that a change in the professional was necessary. Inquiries were made as to Kay's financial status and it was decided to award him a pension and elect him as an Honorary Member of the club. A gift of £200 was also presented, following another subscription, and Kay's employment came to an end after 41 years.

== Golf course designer ==
James Kay was himself a notable course designer; the Seaton Carew records show that he was charged with creating four additional holes which were opened on 4 August 1891. The club records of golf clubs such as Bishop Auckland Golf Club, Middlesbrough Golf Club and Beamish Park Golf Club record Kay's involvement in their design and subsequent works. There are likely to be a number of other clubs which benefited from Kay's advice.

== Death ==
Shortly before his retirement Kay was helping his former assistant to chop up some old railway sleepers, for use as fuel in the clubhouse, when he got a wood splinter in his right thumb. He developed blood poisoning, his condition gradually worsened, and on 18 April 1927 Kay died. His funeral was attended by fellow professionals, Seaton Carew members, and staff from the club acted as pall bearers. The body of this golfing legend was finally laid to rest in Seaton Carew parish churchyard and he is commemorated in the name of the club's old course 8th hole which is named "Jimmy Kay".

== Results in major championships ==
Tournament	1887	1888	1889	1890	1891	1892	1893	1894	1895	1896	1897	1898	1899
The Open Championship	T12	DNP	DNP	T11	T15	T5	T6	T41	T25	T14	25	12	29

Tournament	1900	1901	1902	1903	1904	1905	1906	1907	1908	1909	1910	1911	1912
The Open Championship	T22	31	CUT	T33	CUT	30	T30	54	56	T38	DNP	DNP	58

Note: Kay played only in The Open Championship.

"T" indicates a tie for a place
Yellow background for top-10

== Team appearances ==
- England–Scotland Professional Match (representing Scotland): 1903 (winners)
