= 1893 Open Championship =

Coordinates: 55.502°N 4.619°W

Tournament information
- Dates: 31 August – 1 September 1893
- Location: Prestwick, South Ayrshire, Scotland
- Course: Prestwick Golf Club

Statistics
- Field: 72 players
- Cut: none
- Prize fund: £90
- Winner's share: £30

Champion
- (Scotland) William Auchterlonie
- 322

Location in Scotland

The 1893 Open Championship was the 33rd Open Championship, held 31 August–1 September at Prestwick Golf Club in Prestwick, South Ayrshire, Scotland. William Auchterlonie won the Championship, two strokes ahead of the amateur Johnny Laidlay.

The entries includes 46 professionals and 26 amateurs. The weather on the first day was very wet, rain falling heavily all day. In his first Open Championship, J.H. Taylor made an immediate impact, leading after the first round with a score of 75. Auchterlonie was next after a 78. In the afternoon Taylor has a disappointing 89. At the end of the day Auchterlonie led on 159, three ahead of John Ball, James Kay, Hugh Kirkaldy, and Robert Simpson, all on 162. Sandy Herd and Laidlay were a further stroke behind.

Auchterlonie started his third round badly, taking six on the 1st hole and four at the short 2nd. However, he recovered well and took only 19 strokes for the final five holes to finish on 81 and a total 240. This was enough for him to retain the lead, but now by only one stroke from Herd, with Kay and Simpson only a shot further back and Laidlay three behind. Taylor disappointed again with an 86 to be 10 shots behind.

In the final round, Auchterlonie again took six at the 1st hole but finished with an 82 and a total of 322 to set a difficult target for his challengers. Laidlay seemed to have ruined his chances with a seven at the 3rd but he played well for the rest of round and finished just two behind Auchterlonie on 324. Herd started badly taking 15 on the first three holes. He reached the 17th needing seven on the last two holes to match Auchterlonie. His second shot to the 17th found a bunker and he eventually finished three strokes behind the winner. Auchterlonie won the gold Championship Medal valued at £10 and the £30 first prize. He was just 21 years old and remains the second youngest Open Championship winner after Tom Morris Jr.

In tieing for 6th place James Kay, long-term professional at Seaton Carew Golf Club, reached his second highest position in the 22 Open Championships in which he played. He also tied for 5th in 1892.

== First day leaderboard ==
Thursday, 31 August 1893

Place	Player	Score
1	(Scotland) William Auchterlonie	78-81=159
T2	(England) John Ball (a)	83-79=162
T2	(Scotland) James Kay	81-81=162
T2	(Scotland) Hugh Kirkaldy	83-79=162
T2	(Scotland) Robert Simpson	81-81=162
T6	(Scotland) Sandy Herd	82-81=163
T6	(Scotland) Johnny Laidlay (a)	80-83=163
8	(England) J.H. Taylor	75-89=164
T9	(Scotland) Andrew Kirkaldy	85-82=167
T9	(Scotland) Jack White	81-86=167

== Final leaderboard ==
Friday, 1 September 1893

Place	Player	Score	Money
1	(Scotland) William Auchterlonie	78-81-81-82=322	£30
2	(Scotland) Johnny Laidlay (a)	80-83-80-81=324	−
3	(Scotland) Sandy Herd	82-81-78-84=325	£20
T4	(Scotland) Andrew Kirkaldy	85-82-82-77=326	£8 10s
T4	(Scotland) Hugh Kirkaldy	83-79-82-82=326	£8 10s
T6	(Scotland) James Kay	81-81-80-85=327	£4 10s
T6	(Scotland) Robert Simpson	81-81-80-85=327	£4 10s
T8	(England) John Ball (a)	83-79-84-86=332	−
T8	(England) Harold Hilton (a)	88-81-82-81=332	−
T10	(England) J.H. Taylor	75-89-86-83=333	£3
T10	(Scotland) Jack White	81-86-80-86=333	£3
