= 1892 Open Championship =

Coordinates: 56.043°N 2.823°W

Tournament information
- Dates: 22–23 September 1892
- Location: Gullane, East Lothian, Scotland
- Course: Muirfield

Statistics
- Field: 60 players
- Cut: none
- Prize fund: £110
- Winner's share: £35

Champion
- (England) Harold Hilton (a)
- 305

Location in Scotland

The 1892 Open Championship was the 32nd Open Championship, held 22–23 September at Muirfield in Gullane, East Lothian, Scotland. Harold Hilton, an amateur, won the Championship by three strokes from another amateur John Ball and two professionals: Sandy Herd and Hugh Kirkaldy. This was the second win by an amateur following Ball's victory in 1890.

The Honourable Company of Edinburgh Golfers had previously hosted the Open six times on the public nine-hole Musselburgh Links before building the private 18-hole course at Muirfield. The Muirfield course had only been completed nine months before the Championship. The 1892 Open was the first to be contested over 72 holes and the first to take place on two days. 36 holes were played each day. As in previous years the order of play was determined by a draw but it was decided that a different draw would be used on the two days.

After the announcement that the Open would move from Musselburgh to Muirfield, a number of local golfers protested about the change of venue. When the Honourable Company refused to change the venue back to Musselburgh, these members determined to run their own "open" competition on the same days as the official event. By offering much higher prize money, they hoped to induce the leading professionals to play in their "open". This, however, resulted in a large increase in the prize money for the official event from £30 in 1891 to over £100. Realising that the leading players would play in the official Open, the Musselburgh Open Tournament was moved to an earlier date (14 and 15 September) so that the professionals could compete in both events.

== Details ==
Herd was one of the early starters on the first day and his 77 gave him an early lead. He was later passed by John Ball, who scored 75, and by Horace Hutchinson with a 74. Hutchinson had a 78 in the afternoon to lead on 152, three ahead of Ball, Herd and Willie Park Jr.

Ball was one of the early starters on the second day and, finishing with seven successive fours, had a 74 and a total of 229. Herd had a 77 to lie three behind Ball. Hutchinson started badly with a six at the 1st and eventually finished with an 86 and a total of 238, nine behind Ball. The highlight of the morning was Hilton's round of 72. He started with a two and followed with six fours and an outward nine of 35. Coming home in 37 his total of 231 put him in second place, only two behind Ball. Kirkaldy lay fourth on 233.

Ball had a 79 in the final round to finish on 308. Kirkaldy came to last hole needing a five to beat Ball but topped his third shot into a bunker and took six to tie with Ball on 308. Soon afterwards, Herd came to the last also needing a five to finish ahead of Ball. However, he also took six after three-putting and Ball, Kirkaldy and Herd were all tied in the lead. Hilton was the last of the leading players to start. He took six at the 2nd hole but then pitched in at the 3rd and holed from 15 yards at the 6th. Playing perfectly, he reached the 16th tee needing to score 18 from the last three holes to win. He took five at the 16th but followed with a three to simply need an eight at the last to win. Taking six he won the three strokes.

In tying for 5th place James Kay, long-term professional at Seaton Carew Golf Club, reached his highest position in the 22 Open Championships in which he played. He also tied for 6th in 1893.

There was some controversy after the finish when, the winner being an amateur, the first prize of £35 "was withdrawn according to the rules" and not distributed to the professionals, "a proceeding, however, which did not altogether please the professionals, who hardly seemed to understand the arrangement". Herd and Kirkaldy shared the second and third prizes of £18 and £12, receiving £15 each. An unnamed member donated £5 to be given to the player with the lowest round, to be given in cash to professionals or to buy a memento if an amateur. A miniature gold medal was presented to the winner.

== First day leaderboard ==
Thursday, 22 September 1892

Place	Player	Score
1	(England) Horace Hutchinson (a)	74-78=152
T2	(England) John Ball (a)	75-80=155
T2	(Scotland) Sandy Herd	77-78=155
T2	(Scotland) Willie Park Jr.	78-77=155
5	(Scotland) Ben Sayers	80-76=156
T6	(Scotland) David Anderson Jr.	76-82=158
T6	(Jersey) Tom Vardon	83-75=158
T8	(Scotland) David Brown	77-82=159
T8	(England) Harold Hilton (a)	78-81=159
T10	(Scotland) Ernley Blackwell (a)	79-81=160
T10	(Scotland) James Kay	82-78=160
T10	(Scotland) Hugh Kirkaldy	77-83=160
T10	(Scotland) Samuel Mure Fergusson (a)	78-82=160
T10	(Scotland) Jack White	82-78=160

== Final leaderboard ==
Friday, 23 September 1892

Place	Player	Score	Money
1	(England) Harold Hilton (a)	78-81-72-74=305	−
T2	(England) John Ball (a)	75-80-74-79=308	−
T2	(Scotland) Sandy Herd	77-78-77-76=308	£15
T2	(Scotland) Hugh Kirkaldy	77-83-73-75=308	£15
T5	(Scotland) James Kay	82-78-74-78=312	£7
T5	(Scotland) Ben Sayers	80-76-81-75=312	£7
7	(Scotland) Willie Park Jr.	78-77-80-80=315	£5
8	(Scotland) Willie Fernie	79-83-76-78=316	£4
9	(Scotland) Archie Simpson	81-81-76-79=317	£4
10	(England) Horace Hutchinson (a)	74-78-86-80=318	−

As an amateur Hilton did not receive the first prize of £35. He did, however, receive a gold medal and £5 in plate for recording the lowest score for a single round. The Royal Liverpool Club, of which he was a member, received possession of the Championship Cup for the year. The prize money for the professionals was reduced accordingly to £75.

== Musselburgh Open ==
The Musselburgh Open took place a week before the official event on 14 and 15 September. Because of the late change in date entries were allowed until the opening day. 58 players competed including six amateurs. Most of the leading professionals played. The tournament format was similar to that of the official Open except that, Musselburgh being only a nine-hole course, there were eight rounds of nine holes rather than four rounds of 18.

The first prize was £30 and a championship gold medal. There were 11 other prizes from £16 down to £2 and total prize money of £95. If the winner was an amateur he would receive £30 in plate but otherwise amateurs would not receive prize money.

Douglas McEwan was leader after the first round with 36. After two rounds Willie Fernie and Sandy Herd led on 75. Jack Kirkaldy took over the lead after a third round of 35 to lead on 112, a lead he maintained at the end of the day after a 36 put him on 148. Herd was second on 153.

In the fifth round Kirkaldy took eight at the 2nd and 3rd holes and finished with 44. Herd took over the lead on 190. Herd himself had a bad sixth round and David Brown led on 231. Willie Park Jr. scored 37 in the seventh round and led on 269 and finishing with a last round 36 his total was 305, five ahead of the rest. After some good golf Tom Vardon came second. Park had trailed by ten at the end of the first day.
