= 1891 Open Championship =

Coordinates: 56.043°N 2.823°W

Tournament information
- Dates: 6–7 October 1891
- Location: St Andrews, Scotland
- Course: Old Course at St Andrews

Statistics
- Field: 84 players
- Prize fund: £28 10s
- Winner's share: £10

Champion
- (Scotland) Hugh Kirkaldy
- 166

Location in Scotland

The 1891 Open Championship was the 31st Open Championship, held 6 October at the Old Course at St Andrews, Fife, Scotland. Hugh Kirkaldy won by two strokes from his brother Andrew Kirkaldy and Willie Fernie. This was the last Open Championship contested in a single day over 36 holes. The 1892 Open was contested over 72 holes played on two successive days.

Entries closed on the Saturday before the event but a number of players entered on the Monday and "the committee declined to accept them". These late entries were later allowed to compete "under protest" but received no prize-money.

Hugh Kirkaldy had the best round of the morning. He three-putted the first two holes but still reached the turn in 39. Playing into a strong wind, he came back in 44 for a round of 83. He was closely followed by four players on 84. Willie More reached the turn in 40, coming back in 44. Andrew Kirkaldy had one of the better back nines of 43 to also score 84. The others on 84 were Fernie and Davie Grant, "one of the late entrants".

Rain fell heaving for most of the afternoon but the wind was slightly lighter. Hugh Kirkaldy had seven fours in an outward 38 but took five on every hole on the back nine to come home in 45, a round of 83 and a total of 166. More disappointed with an 87 was Andrew Kirkaldy who had reached the turn in 39 and still reached the 17th tee in a strong position. However he took six at the 17th and then missed a "longish putt" at the last which would have tied his brother. He eventually three-putted for another six. Fernie reached the turn in 42 but had an excellent 42 coming home to tie with Andrew Kirkaldy. None of the other players challenged Hugh Kirkaldy although the amateur Samuel Mure Fergusson had a three at the last to take fourth place.

The 1891 Open was the last time there was a play-off for prize money. Andrew Kirkaldy and Fernie played an 18 hole play-off on the following day. Kirkaldy won and took the second prize, Fernie taking third prize. "The day was beautifully fine, and the players had a large following".

== Final leaderboard ==
Tuesday, 6 October 1891

Place	Player	Score	Money
1	(Scotland) Hugh Kirkaldy	83-83=166	£10
T2	(Scotland) Willie Fernie	84-84=168	Playoff
T2	(Scotland) Andrew Kirkaldy	84-84=168	Playoff
4	(Scotland) Samuel Mure Fergusson (a)	86-84=170	−
5	(England) Willie More	84-87=171	£4
6	(Scotland) Willie Park Jr.	88-85=173	£2
7	(Scotland) David Brown	88-86=174	−
T8	(Scotland) William Auchterlonie (a)	85-90=175	−
T8	(England) Harold Hilton (a)	89-86=175	−
T10	(Scotland) Ben Sayers	91-85=176	£1
T10	(Jersey) Tom Vardon	89-87=176	−

Nineteen-year-old William Auchterlonie, the 1893 Champion, played as an amateur. David Brown and Tom Vardon entered late and received no prize money.

=== Playoff ===
Wednesday, 7 October 1891

Andrew Kirkaldy beat Willie Fernie in an 18-hole play-off for the second and third prizes. Kirkaldy scored 85 and won £6, Fernie scored 87 and took home £5.
