= Samuel Mure Fergusson =

Scottish golfer (1855–1928)

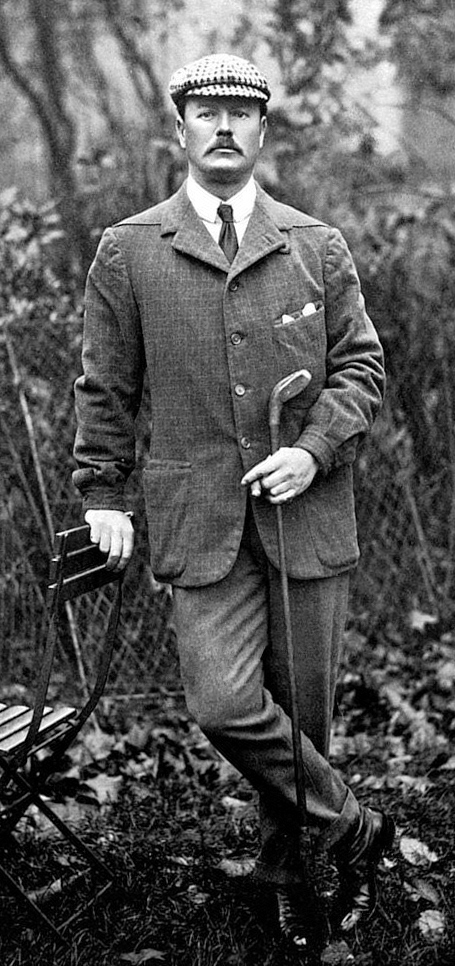
- Fergusson c. 1895

Personal information
- Nationality: Scotland
- Born: 1855 Perth, Scotland
- Died: 9 December 1928 (aged 73) Byfleet, Surrey, England

Career
- Sport: Golf
- Status: Amateur

Best results in major championships
- Masters Tournament: DNP
- PGA Championship: DNP
- U.S. Open: DNP
- The Open Championship: 4th: 1891
- British Amateur: 2nd: 1894, 1898

Samuel Mure Fergusson (1855 – 9 December 1928) was a Scottish amateur golfer who played in the late 19th and early 20th centuries. Fergusson placed fourth in the 1891 Open Championship. Fergusson twice came close to winning The Amateur Championship. His best effort came in the 1894 Amateur Championship where he battled the legendary John Ball at Royal Liverpool Golf Club, eventually losing by the score of 1 up.

== Early life ==
Fergusson was born in 1855 in Perth, Scotland. He learned the game as a young lad, first beginning to play when he was 14. At age 24 he became a member of The Royal and Ancient Golf Club of St Andrews and won the Autumn Medal in his first competition. He became a stock broker and worked in London. In the 1880s he played golf at Felixstowe but later moved to Royal St George's in Sandwich.

== Golf career ==
=== 1894 Amateur Championship ===
In the 1894 Amateur Championship, held at Royal Liverpool Golf Club, Fergusson lost 1 up to John Ball.

=== 1898 Amateur Championship ===
In the 1898 Amateur Championship, once again held at Royal Liverpool Golf Club, Fergusson lost to Freddie Tait 7 and 5. On 7 February 1900, Tait would lose his life in South Africa fighting in the Second Boer War.

=== 1891 Open Championship ===
The 1891 Open Championship was the 31st Open Championship, held 6 October at the Old Course at St Andrews, Fife, Scotland. Hugh Kirkaldy won by two strokes from his brother Andrew Kirkaldy and Willie Fernie. This was the last Open Championship contested in a single day over 36 holes. The 1892 Open was contested over 72 holes played on two successive days.

==== Details of play ====
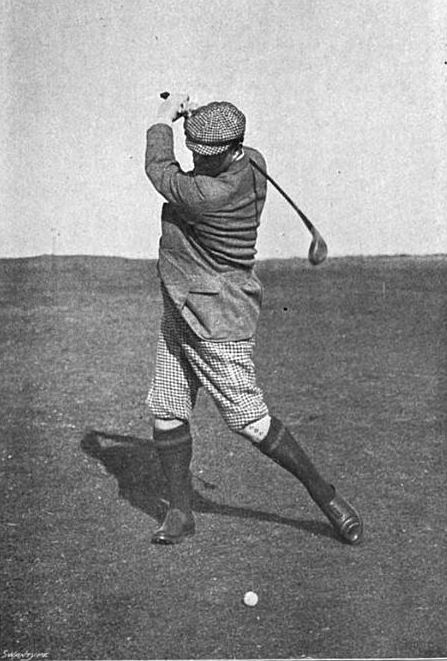
Fergusson at the top of the backswing, c. 1891

Entries closed on the Saturday before the event but a number of players entered on the Monday and "the committee declined to accept them". These late entries were later allowed to compete "under protest" but received no prize money.

Hugh Kirkaldy had the best round of the morning. He three-putted the first two holes but still reached the turn in 39. Playing into a strong wind, he came back in 44 for a round of 83. He was closely followed by four players on 84. Willie More reached the turn in 40, coming back in 44. Andrew Kirkaldy had one of the better back nines of 43 to also score 84. The others on 84 were Fernie and Davie Grant, "one of the late entrants".

Heavy rain fell for most of the afternoon but the wind was slightly lighter. Hugh Kirkaldy had seven fours in an outward 38 but took five on every hole on the back nine to come home in 45, a round of 83 and a total of 166. More disappointed with an 87 was Andrew Kirkaldy, the brother of Hugh, who had reached the turn in 39 and stood on the 17th tee in a strong position. However, he took six at the 17th and then missed a "longish putt" at the last which would have tied his brother. He eventually three-putted for another six. Fernie reached the turn in 42 but had an excellent 42 coming home to tie with Andrew Kirkaldy. None of the other players challenged Hugh Kirkaldy although the amateur Fergusson had a three at the last to take fourth place.

The 1891 Open was the last time there was a play-off for prize money. Andrew Kirkaldy and Fernie played an 18-hole playoff on the following day. Kirkaldy won and took the second prize, Fernie taking third prize. "The day was beautifully fine, and the players had a large following".

== Later life ==
In 1895 Fergusson laid out the New Zealand Golf Club course on the estate of Hugh F. Locke King, the aviation pioneer and motoring enthusiast. It was an unusual design for the day, not being a seaside links course but instead it was carved out of a heavy forest. By 1910 Fergusson had been named as captain of The Royal and Ancient Golf Club of St Andrews. Later in his career Fergusson designed a 9-hole golf course for King Edward at Windsor and Duff House Royal in Scotland with Archie Simpson.

== Death and legacy ==
Fergusson died on 9 December 1928 in Byfleet, Surrey, England. He is best remembered for his long golf career of over 40 years and for twice finishing second in the Amateur Championship in 1894 and 1898.

== Results in major championships ==
Tournament	1873	1874	1875	1876	1877	1878	1879
The Open Championship	14	DNP	DNP	DNP	DNP	DNP	DNP

Tournament	1880	1881	1882	1883	1884	1885	1886	1887	1888	1889
The Open Championship	DNP	DNP	DNP	DNP	DNP	DNP	T24	DNP	DNP	DNP
The Amateur Championship	NYF	NYF	NYF	NYF	NYF	R16	QF	DNP	DNP	DNP

Tournament	1890	1891	1892	1893	1894	1895	1896	1897	1898	1899
The Open Championship	DNP	4 LA	15	T15	18	T40	32	T12	CUT	WD
The Amateur Championship	DNP	R64	R16	SF	2	R32	R64	R32	2	R64

Tournament	1900	1901	1902	1903	1904	1905	1906	1907	1908	1909
The Open Championship	34	T15	DNP	DNP	WD	DNP	DNP	DNP	DNP	DNP
The Amateur Championship	R32	R64	QF	R128	R64	DNP	DNP	DNP	DNP	R128

Tournament	1910	1911	1912	1913	1914
The Open Championship	DNP	DNP	DNP	DNP	DNP
The Amateur Championship	DNP	DNP	DNP	DNP	R64

Note: Fergusson played only in The Open Championship and The Amateur Championship.

LA = Low amateur
NYF = Tournament not yet founded
NT = No tournament
DNP = Did not play
WD = Withdrew
"T" indicates a tie for a place
R256, R128, R64, R32, R16, QF, SF = Round in which player lost in match play
Green background for wins. Yellow background for top-10

Sources: Open Championship, 1885 Amateur, 1886 Amateur, 1891 Amateur, 1892 Amateur, 1893 Amateur, 1895 Amateur, 1896 Amateur, 1899 Amateur, 1901 Amateur, 1902 Amateur, 1903 Amateur, 1909 Amateur, 1914 Amateur

== Team appearances ==
- England–Scotland Amateur Match (representing Scotland): 1902 (winners), 1903, 1904 (winners)
