= Seaton Carew Golf Club =

Golf club in Seaton Carew, County Durham, England

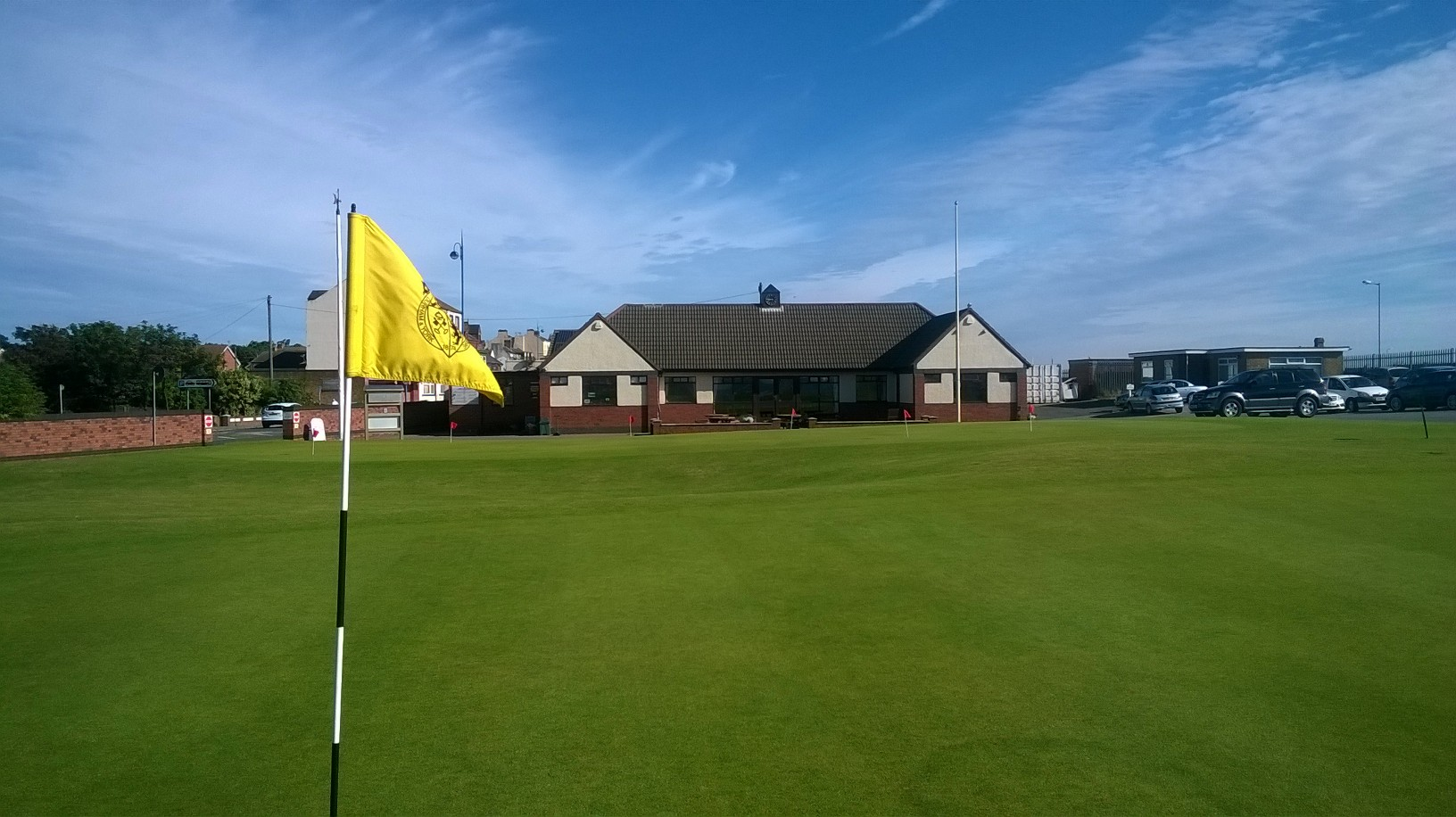
- Clubhouse in 2014

Club information
- Location: Seaton Carew, Hartlepool, England, TS25 1DE
- Established: 1874
- Type: Private
- Total holes: 22 (5 course layouts)
- Tournaments: Brabazon Trophy (1985, 2014), Ladies' British Open Amateur Stroke Play Championship (1974), British Mid-Amateur Championship (2001), Carris Trophy (1996), Boys Amateur Championship and Jacques Léglise Trophy (1978, 1986)
- Website: www.seatoncarewgolfclub.co.uk

The Old Course
- Designer: Alister MacKenzie
- Par: 71
- Length: 6,603 yards (6,038 m)

The Micklem Course
- Designer: Alister MacKenzie & Frank Pennink
- Par: 71
- Length: 6,594 yards (6,030 m)

The Brabazon Course
- Designer: Alister MacKenzie & Frank Pennink
- Par: 73
- Length: 6,920 yards (6,330 m)

The Bishop Course
- Designer: Alister MacKenzie & Frank Pennink
- Par: 73
- Length: 6,857 yards (6,270 m)

The New Course
- Designer: Alister MacKenzie & Frank Pennink
- Par: 72
- Length: 6,850 yards (6,260 m)

Seaton Carew Golf Club has held golf games since 1874, making it the tenth oldest golf club in England. The club is based in Seaton Carew, near Hartlepool on the North Sea coast, north of the River Tees in North East England. When it was first established it was the only golf club in the English counties of Yorkshire and Durham, hence its original name Durham and Yorkshire Golf Club; the club's crest and badge retain the emblems of both the archbishop of Durham and the archbishop of York.

As more golf clubs were coming into being, particularly in North Yorkshire and County Durham, the club's committee and members decided the old title was no longer apt and the name of Seaton Carew Golf Club was adopted in 1887. By the end of the 19th century the links was already regarded as one of the English game's premier golfing locations. In the 1888-89 Golfing Annual the course was described as being of "sandy nature, covered with soft velvet turf that springs under one's foot and rejuvenates the aged". and was also featured in The Illustrated Sporting and Dramatic News which even in 1894 stated that "in the opinion of visitors that between St Andrews and Sandwich there are few better rounds on the east coast than Seaton Carew." The course has since featured in many golf publications and reviews. Seaton Carew is frequently referred to as one of the most challenging links golf courses anywhere in the British Isles. In 2009 the "Sky News" reporter Graeme Bailey said of his visit to these links "Seaton Carew has everything any golfer would want, but most importantly it is a course which could stand shoulder to shoulder with anything in Britain."

Seaton Carew Golf Club was one of the earliest golf clubs in the UK to elect a lady captain of the club. Jane Longhorn was appointed in December 2010 and served the club as captain throughout 2011. Longhorn was the first lady to be elected as captain in the club's 136-year history.

== Founding of the club ==
This golf club's existence is due mainly to one man, its founder Dr. Duncan McCuaig, a surgeon from Edinburgh who moved down to Middlesbrough shortly after qualifying at Edinburgh University. McCuaig was a good golfer, winning the gold medal at St Andrews on two occasions, in 1867 and 1869.

On transferring to Middlesbrough to further his medical career Dr. McCuaig was dismayed to find there was nowhere throughout County Durham or North Yorkshire to exercise his talent for the game. So he set about finding a suitable place to play. As luck would have it he came across a strip of pasture land, known locally as The Snooks at Seaton Carew, where local people grazed their livestock. It was close to the mouth of the River Tees, running between the north shore and Seaton Carew village, and was owned by Lord Eldon. With Eldon's permission, and after some resistance from the stint holders whose sheep and cattle roamed the area, Dr. McCuaig and a few like-minded colleagues were able to rent a piece of land on which they established the Durham and Yorkshire Golf Club. The contribution that Dr. McCuaig made to the creation of Seaton Carew Golf Club is recalled every time anyone plays the Seaton links, a challenging par 3 surrounded by eight bunkers is named "The Doctor" in his memory.

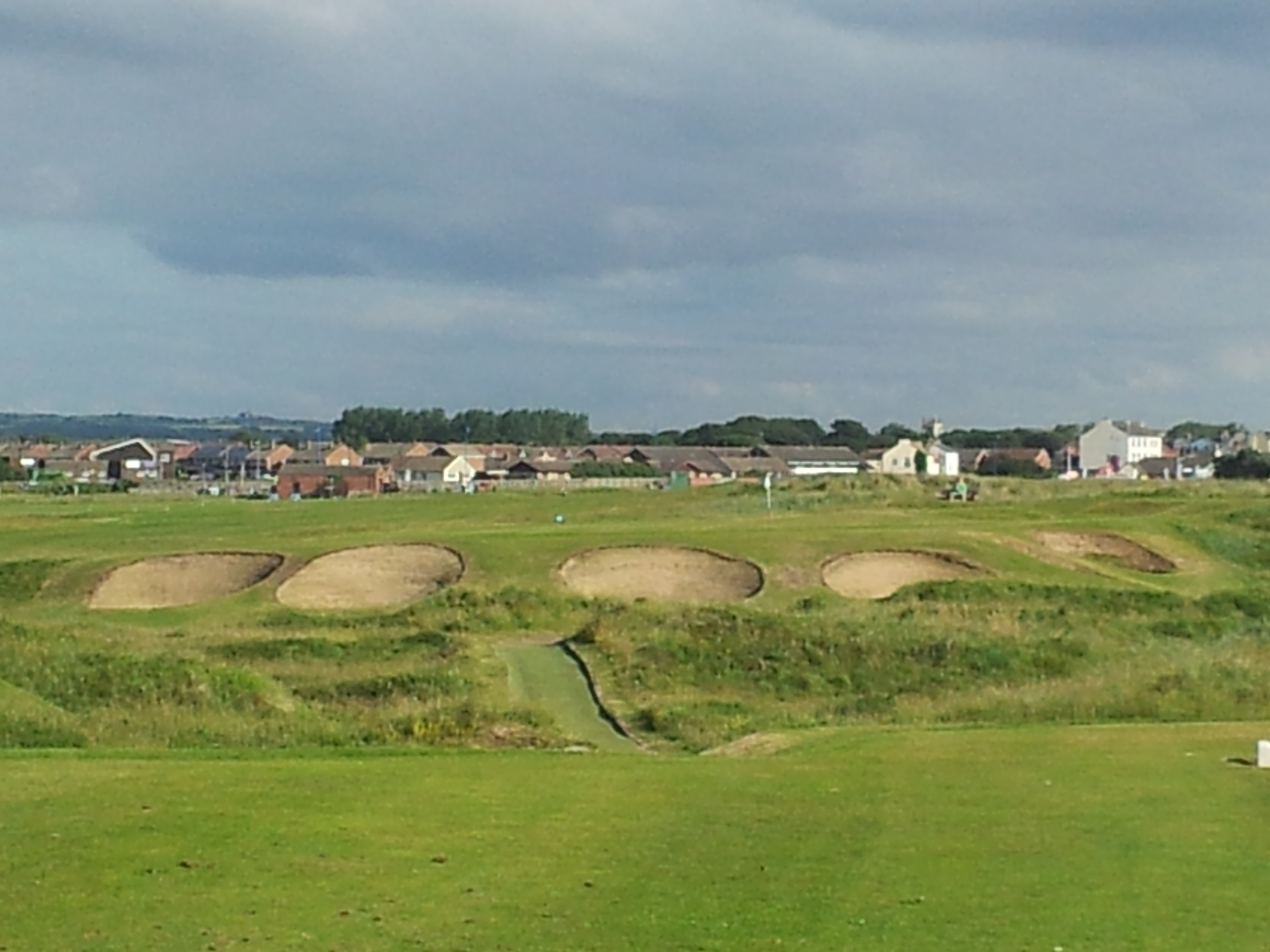
"The Doctor" a testing Par 3 named after Club Founder Dr. Duncan McCuaig.

=== Seaton Carew Golf Club historical records and archive ===
The club has an extensive historical archive as a result of the association of the Bunting family. Today this archive is held by Mr. Edward Bunting whose grandfather, C. J. Bunting and father, G. Bunting, both served as officials of the club. The Buntings' continuous association with the club began before 1890 when the archive began. C. J. Bunting became club secretary in 1893 recording in his newspaper archive "Appointed Honorary Secretary of Seaton Carew Golf Club on the 8th November 1893 but did not take office until the 13th of November 1893 (my birthday)". Edward Bunting, a member of The Royal and Ancient Golf Club of St Andrews since 1991, was a marshal at three Open Championships in 1995, 2000 and 2005 and his father Gilbert Bunting was a referee at five Ryder Cups. Edward Bunting, who in 2014 was aged 78, during his amateur golfing career reached a handicap of 1. Bunting had the honour of scoring a "hole-in-one" on the Old Course at St Andrews which has been certificated by the Royal and Ancient Golf Club. This was his only hole-in-one throughout a long amateur golfing career, not as you might expect on a par 3 but on the 307-yard par 4 9th hole on the "Old Course".

The Seaton Carew Golf Club archives held by the Bunting family have been used to prepare several unpublished papers about the history of the club, but two publications have used them extensively. Firstly, a book celebrating the centenary of the club was published by Derek Hornby in 1974 entitled "The History of Seaton Carew Golf Club 1874-1974". In 1999 Mr Ron Trotter produced a pictorial history of the club to celebrate the 125th anniversary entitled "125 years of Golf at Seaton Carew 1874-1999". In this latter publication many of the historical papers, photographs and score cards in the Bunting archive were reproduced. In Mr Hornby's book he makes a very appropriate dedication to the bulk of the golfing fraternity but is particularly pertinent to those such as the Bunting family "To all those ordinary club golfers who will never be champions but whose whole hearted enthusiasm for the game make them its backbone."

== Course development ==
Originally the course was laid out by Dr. McCuaig with 14 holes, four extra holes were added by the Club Professional James Kay and opened on 3 August 1891 by the club's first president Major Matthew Gray, but in the 1920s following a remark made by Bernard Darwin in his book "Golf Courses of Great Britain" that Seaton was "grand golfing country but there was not quite enough of it", the club's members decided to support the redevelopment of the 18 holes. This led the club to call upon the services of course designer Dr. Alister MacKenzie, who went on to create such masterpieces as Augusta National and Cypress Point. He advised the abandonment of some inland holes replacing them with new holes on sandier soil towards the coast, and it's that 1925 layout which forms the basis of today's Old Course at Seaton Carew.

In the 1970s the construction of the a cooling water pipeline tunnel for a nearby power station provided the club with a financial windfall and four new holes were added, under the direction of another great golf architect Frank Pennink. They became known as the "Brabazon loop" and now provide the club with twenty two holes offering a choice of five different course layouts known as the Old, Brabazon, Micklem, New and Bishop courses. (The Bishop Course is named after a Seaton Carew green keeper, Peter Bishop.) The five course layouts and cards from the championship (white tees) can be seen in the "Course Records" section of this page.

Always on the look out for innovations in golf course management, in 2012 Seaton Carew began renovation of all of its south facing bunkers using the "EnviroBunker" methods and materials. The technology eliminates bunker face drying and sand erosion. The work was completed in time for the 2014 Brabazon Trophy.

== Notable golfers on the Seaton Carew Golf Links ==
=== "Where the Great Ones Trod" ===
Many famous golfers have played Seaton Carew's links over the years, this includes the Great Triumvirate Harry Vardon, J. H. Taylor, and James Braid. Other notable players include Jack White, John Ball, and Harold Hilton. Most of the aforementioned players played in professional challenges with Seaton Carew's longest serving professional, Jimmy Kay. HRH Edward, Prince of Wales, played at Seaton Carew in 1930, and later that decade Walter Hagen and Joe Kirkwood stopped off during their tour of Europe. In more recent times Open Champion Sir Nick Faldo and current European Tour players Justin Rose, Graeme Storm, and Peter Baker have competed over Seaton's links as amateurs as this course is often a challenging host to many amateur championships. Rose went on to be the U.S. Open Champion in 2013. Nick Faldo played at Seaton Carew in the club's Pro-Am in 1976 winning the professional tournament with a 69 (par 72) on the Old Course. Peter Alliss, the renowned golf commentator, has created video flyovers of all of Seaton Carew's five courses and commented "The tenth oldest in England and a true championship links to challenge all levels of players."

=== Seaton Carew's Legendary Club Professional - James Kay (40 year's service 1886 – 1926) ===
The role of a golf professional has changed through the years and it has been described in many famous golfing texts from J. H. Taylor's comprehensive "Taylor on Golf" in 1902 (which lists Seaton Carew) through to numerous biographies of the modern day. However too few of the biographies of many of golf's earlier great players have appeared in print but for these players their records speak for them. In this regard few golf clubs can boast of a golfing legend as their long-term professional, an exceptional example is that of Seaton Carew's longest serving professional, James Kay.

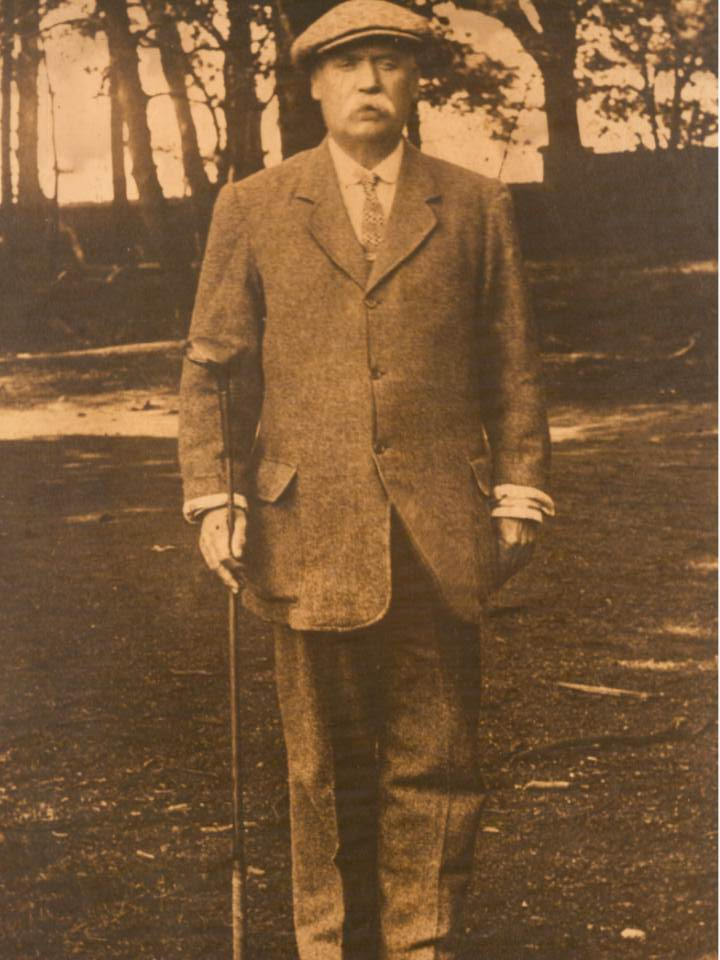
James (Jimmy) Kay - Seaton Carew G.C. Professional for 40 years 1886–1926. Played in 22 Open Championships achieving better than 6th place in both 1892 & 93. Renowned "Money Match" Player.

Kay, born in Lieth, Scotland in 1855, was engaged by Seaton Carew as their professional on 1 May 1886 following the resignation of Tom Park a member of the famous Park Scottish golfing family. It was Kay's playing record that elevated him above his peers. Press reports of the time showed that Kay played in a total of 22 Open Championships, qualifying in 20 and twice finishing in the top six in the 1892 Open at Muirfield and 1893 Open at Prestwick. On 8 June 1908 he also represented his homeland when he played for Scotland in an international match against England at Prestwick Golf Club. In May 1909, at the age of 53, Kay won the Leeds Cup, a tournament for professional golfers; this is currently the oldest trophy in professional golf worldwide. It was presented to the Professional Golf Association on its formation in 1901 by Alderman Penrose-Green, Lord Mayor of Leeds and President of Leeds Golf Club to be competed for annually by professional golfers. The first competition was held in 1902 at Leeds Golf Club and Kay was one of its earliest winners. Contemporaries record that Kay was "a veritable demon on the green and extremely adept at laying a stymie and therefore as might be guessed was a very fine match player."

Kay played in an era when most of golf's professional players made their money through "money matches" and this was where Kay came into his own especially when playing against the top golfers of his era. Pride of place must go to his performances against the Great Triumvirate of Golf. J. H. Taylor, James Braid, and Harry Vardon. Many of these memorable matches being reported in newspaper articles of the day that are in the club's historical archive. In 1895 Kay defeated the then Open Champion, Taylor, who had just retained his prestigious title on the Old Course at St Andrews. The match, over 36 holes, took place on 16 June and although the respective scores were equal, James Kay beat his illustrious opponent by one hole. On 22 September 1900, Kay exacted a similar outcome on Braid, although at that time Braid had not yet recorded any of his five Open Championship victories. Vardon was the only member of the Great Triumvirate to actually get the better of James Kay on his home course, when he won 6 and 5 on 8 September 1898. In August 1898 Kay, in an Open Professional tournament ay Earlsferry and Elie links, was second only to Vardon, then Open Champion, beating all other leading professionals including Braid, Taylor, Herd and Kirkaldy. But, eventually around the time of his Leeds Cup win, Kay exacted his revenge on Vardon in an exhibition match at Whitby, defeating Vardon by two holes in a 36-hole exhibition match. Not that these money matches were played in anything but the spirit of friendly rivalry as can be detected by Vardon's comment in his 1905 book "The Complete Golfer" where he tells how advice from his friend James Kay of Seaton Carew helped him win the 1896 Open Championship.

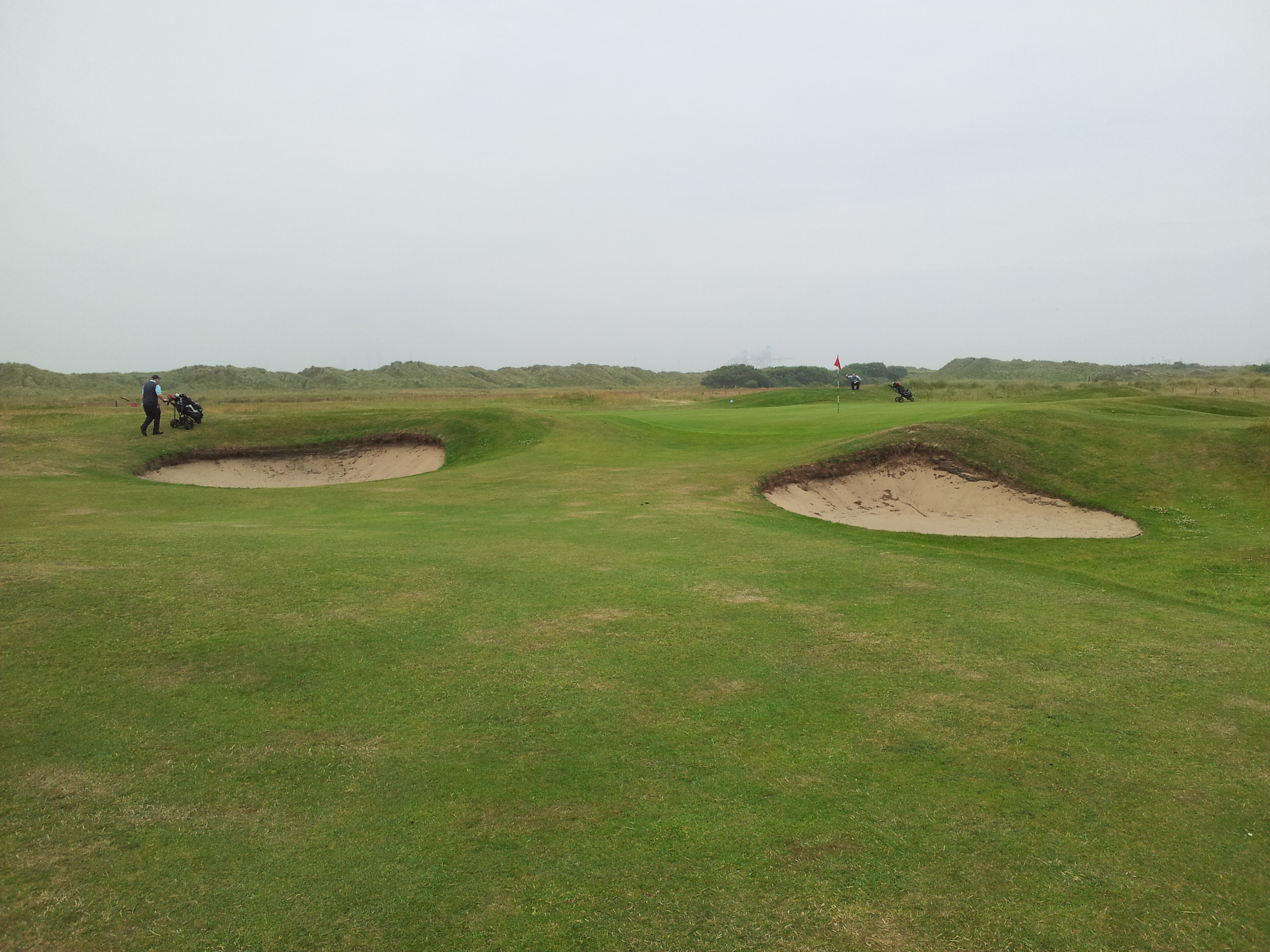
"Jimmy Kay" Par 4 hole named after Club professional James Kay who played in 22 Open Championships, placed in the top 6 in 1892 & 1893.

Other notable wins for Kay came against other great names in golf, he played Huddersfield professional Alexander Herd who was described as "one of the finest golfers of his day" defeating him on 30 June 1894 and also with several championships to his name the well known golfer Mungo Park. Against Park, over the 72 holes, Kay was 11 up at home and 8 up away, thereby winning the match by 19 holes and perhaps more importantly the stake money of £20. A professional called Chisholm, whose home club was Redcar, suffered even greater embarrassment when he was defeated by Kay with a score of 25 up and 24 to play in a 72-hole match on his home course.

Given such a remarkable playing record it is not surprising that James Kay was held in great esteem by the club's members, and on 20 July 1911 the committee agreed to mark the great man's service of 25 years. A total of £23.8s.6d was raised by subscription and a tea and coffee service was presented to him at the club's annual general meeting. Some 14 years later the committee had more serious matters to contemplate, namely Kay's retirement, but the matter was deferred for a further 12 months. On 9 December 1926, after long and serious discussion, it was finally resolved that a change in the professional was necessary. Inquiries were made as to Kay's financial status and it was decided to award him a pension and elect him as an Honorary Member of the club. A gift of £200 was also presented, following another subscription, and Kay's employment came to an end after 41 years.

Kay was himself a notable course designer; the Seaton Carew records show that he was charged with creating four additional holes which were opened on 4 August 1891. The club records of Golf clubs such as Bishop Auckland Golf Club, Middlesbrough Golf Club and Beamish Park Golf Club record Kay's involvement in their design and subsequent works. There are likely to be a number of other clubs which benefited from Kay's advice.

Shortly before his retirement Kay was helping his former assistant to chop up some old railway sleepers, for use as fuel in the clubhouse, when he got a wood splinter in his right thumb. Sadly, he developed blood poisoning, his condition gradually deteriorated and on 17 April 1927 Kay died. His funeral was attended by fellow professionals, Seaton Carew members and staff from the club acted as pall bearers. The body of this golfing legend was finally laid to rest in Seaton Carew Parish churchyard and he is commemorated in the name of the club's Old Course 8th Hole which is named "Jimmy Kay".

=== Three Times One-armed Golf Champion – Jack Lithgo (1903-1975) ===
Seaton Carew Golf Club takes pride in its champions, including the notable amateur golfer Jack Lithgo, who, despite losing an arm in a fall at age six, became one of the club's most recognized players. Lithgo lived close to the club and next door to its professional Jimmy Kay. In the club's history books he recalls how in 1909 he remembered Kay bringing home the Leeds Cup and sitting it proudly on his sideboard. Lithgo was a strong swimmer, good footballer and he could hit a golf ball 275 yards with his driver. In 1966, when he was 63 years old, Lithgo qualified yet again for the match play stage of the One-armed Golfers Championship. This was the 19th successive occasion Lithgo had qualified for the knock out stages and remarkably that year he went on to win the final by defeating, by 3 and 1, the four-time American One-armed champion R. (Bob) Sandler, to whom he was conceding 13 years. This was the fifth time Lithgo had reached the final which he also won in 1948 and 1957.

== Amateur Championships held at Seaton Carew Golf links ==
=== The Brabazon Trophy – The English Men's Strokeplay Championship and The Carris Trophy – The English Boys Championships ===
Seaton Carew Golf Club is regular host to top amateur golf competitions. Golf England's Brabazon Trophy was held at this club in 1985 and the winner, Peter Baker, went on to Ryder Cup and European Tour success after sharing this amateur title with the North East's Roger Roper (Roper famously turned professional at the age of 50 in 2007 to compete on the Seniors Professional Tour.) The 2013 U.S. Open Champion Justin Rose praised Seaton Carew's undulating links course. when in 1996 he came second behind the then amateur now established tour professional Graeme Storm from Hartlepool, in the Carris Trophy (the Boys' equivalent to the Brabazon Trophy). In June 2014 The Brabazon Trophy tournament returned to Seaton Carew and in line with the illustrious outcomes for past winners on this course a bright future is predicted for the winner Ben Stow from Wiltshire. Stow equalled Seaton Carew's Brabazon Course record on the final day with a "birdie" on the final hole to win the Brabazon Trophy by one shot.

=== Championships held at Seaton Carew Links ===
Seaton Carew Golf Club has hosted a number of national championships that attract top international amateur golfers. The club has also hosted international matches between England and the other "home" countries. Below is a list of the main amateur championships that have been held at this club and the winners.

- 1956 British Girls Championship – Winner Ruth Porter,
- 1974 Ladies' British Open Amateur Stroke Play Championship – Winner Julia Greenhalgh,
- 1978 Boys Amateur Championship – Winner Stephen Keppler,
- 1978 Great Britain & Ireland Boys vs European Boys – Jacques Léglise Trophy – Winners Continent of Europe Boys,
- 1985 English Open Amateur Strokeplay Championship (Brabazon Trophy) – Winners Peter Baker & Roger Roper,
- 1986 Boys Amateur Championship – Winner Leslie Walker,
- 1986 Great Britain & Ireland Boys vs European Boys – Jacques Léglise Trophy – Winners Continent of Europe Boys,
- 1996 English Boys Championship (Carris Trophy) – Winner Graeme Storm,
- 1999 English Men's County Championship Finals – Winners Yorkshire,
- 2001 British Mid-Amateur Championship – Winner Stephen East,
- 2014 English Open Amateur Stroke Play Championship (Brabazon Trophy) – Winner Ben Stow,

== The Gray Trophy – one of the earliest English amateur club golf trophies ==
- The Gray Trophy - first match played 2 February 1884.

The history of this trophy was meticulously researched by Seaton Carew Golf Club Archivist Mr Edward Bunting in 2000. This is one of the earliest amateur golf trophies to be played for in England and was presented to Seaton Carew Golf Club by Major Matthew Gray. Major Gray, whose military career was associated with the operation of Hartlepool's defensive battery was the son of the Hartlepool shipbuilding magnate Sir William Gray of William Gray & Company. Matthew Gray was a keen golfer and was re-elected President of Seaton Carew Golf Club on 17 November 1883. The minutes of the club show that in returning his thanks to the members for his re-election it was his intention to present a 20 guinea challenge cup to be played for in stroke play/medal handicap format in the following year by the members. He pronounced that should the cup be won three times outright by any member it would become the absolute property of the gentleman concerned. If no gentleman had won it within 18 months those to have won twice were to play off for the trophy. Between 1884 and 1907 through this magnanimous offer and the continued generosity of the Gray family 8 Gray trophies were bought and presented by the club. The 8th and last was manufactured by the Goldsmith & Silversmith Company Limited of 110-112 Regent Street London for about £30 and donated by Matthew Gray's widow. Silver trophies manufactured and bought for about £30 in the 1880-1900 period may cost £30,000 to produce in 2014.

The 8th Gray Trophy was given to the club by Mrs Eliza (Jeanie) Gray, Major Gray's widow and is still annually played for today by Seaton Carew Golf Club members. The rules however were changed in 1906, prior to the purchase of this last trophy, such that it would be not be retained by the winning member. In fact the competition rules were also adjusted to such that it would be awarded following six annual competitions played in alternate months each year and the winner was to be the member who won most competitions. If no member won more than once then a play off between winners would occur. These rules were also later changed to the four competitions per annum and continue in the same way today.

Matthew Gray was himself a winner one of the first nine "Gray" competitions held for the trophy between February 1884 and May 1885 and a trophy runner-up on at least one other occasions. Winning a competition during the "first Gray" he returned a score of 176 minus his handicap of 32, resulting in a score of 144 for his two rounds. But following the nine competitions a contemporaneous press report states that "a beautiful challenge cup" was presented to Mr R. T. Thompson at an inaugural dinner in the Seaton Hotel. As it happens the runner up for this first trophy was the club's founder Dr Duncan McCuaig. Major Matthew Gray was "occupying the chair" at the presentation dinner. Hence Mr Thompson became the owner of the 1st Gray Trophy.

=== Gray Trophy winners ===
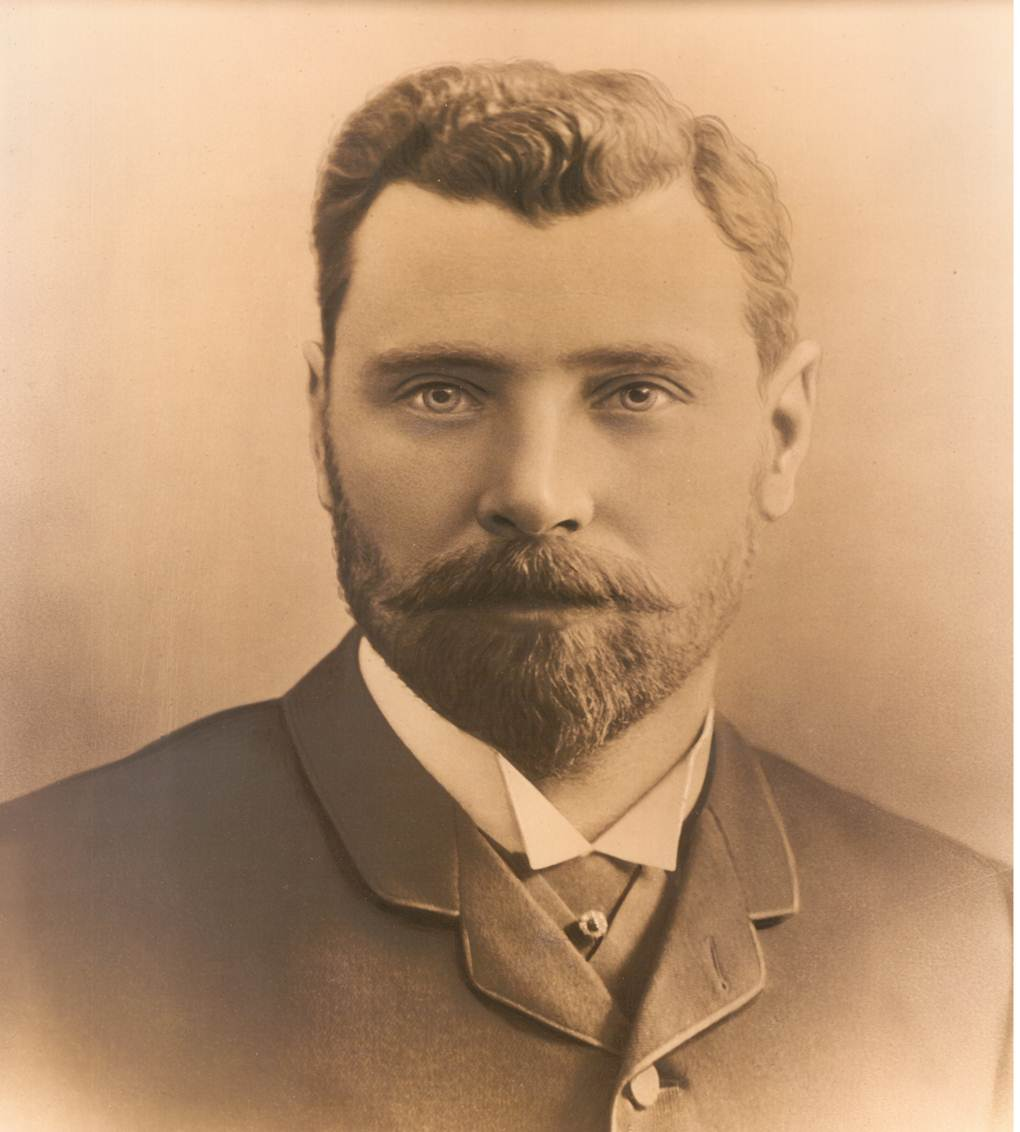
Major Matthew Gray (circa 1890) Golfer, President and Benefactor of Seaton Carew Golf Club.

==== 1st Gray Trophy ====
The whereabouts of this trophy is unknown

- February 1884 – May 1885 winner R T Thompson (runner up Dr McCuaig)

==== 2nd Gray Trophy ====
Described as "a Silver Claret Jug" The whereabouts of this trophy is also unknown.

- August 1885 - February 1887 winner P. Wood Headmaster of Darlington Grammar School 1888/90 (runner up again was Dr McCuaig)

==== 3rd Gray Trophy ====
The 3rd Gray Trophy is described in the Golfing Annual of 1888–89 as "a chaste and elegant piece of silver plate" this being the third prize donated by club president Major Matthew Gray. The whereabouts of this trophy is also unknown.

- March 1887- November 1888 winner J.B. Dale – (Runner up was Matthew Gray)

During 1890 there seems to have been no Gray Trophy competitions until in January 1890 the president Major Gray announced he was pleased to "renew his offer to present the club with a trophy" choosing "an exceedingly beautiful silver cup, tastefully engraved with ferns and flowers". It was to be four and a half years before a member had won the three competitions required to take the trophy.

==== 4th Gray Trophy ====
Press reports show that on 6 June 1991 Major Gray has returned from a tour of the World and there was a "capital turn out of members to welcome home a worthy President" who competed on a day when "the weather was everything that could be desired for a sporting game for the Gray Trophy". Mr L. K. Fawcett won on the day and the new Trophy is described in the press as a "Handsome Prize" but it would be another three years before the trophy was again won outright. The whereabouts of this trophy is unknown.

- February 1890 - August 1894 winner Reverend R.P.A Swettenham

An interesting golfing historical note is that Mr Swettenham played at Seaton Carew under an assumed name of "P.A. Raps". Although Mr Swettenham's full name appears in the club's records P. A. Raps was to appear in the press announcements of the club's activities and the public display boards in the club House. It seems some golfers at that time did not want their employers, customers, parishioners, patients, clients and perhaps even family members to know they were playing golf. Even though competitions were normally held on a Saturday. Sunday golf only began at Seaton Carew after the First World War so this was not even an attempt to disguise Mr Swettenham's absence from Church. The club's records show that several Seaton Carew Golf Club members used such acronyms an this was probably common place at other clubs at that time.

==== 5th Gray Trophy ====
Two trophies were presented to the club by Matthew Gray in August 1893 because he was to be absent again while doing a tour of the world. However, tragically, Major Gray was to die before anyone had won the 5th Trophy. A total of 33 competitions were played before the 5th Gray Trophy was won and by then a total of 11 players had won two competitions.

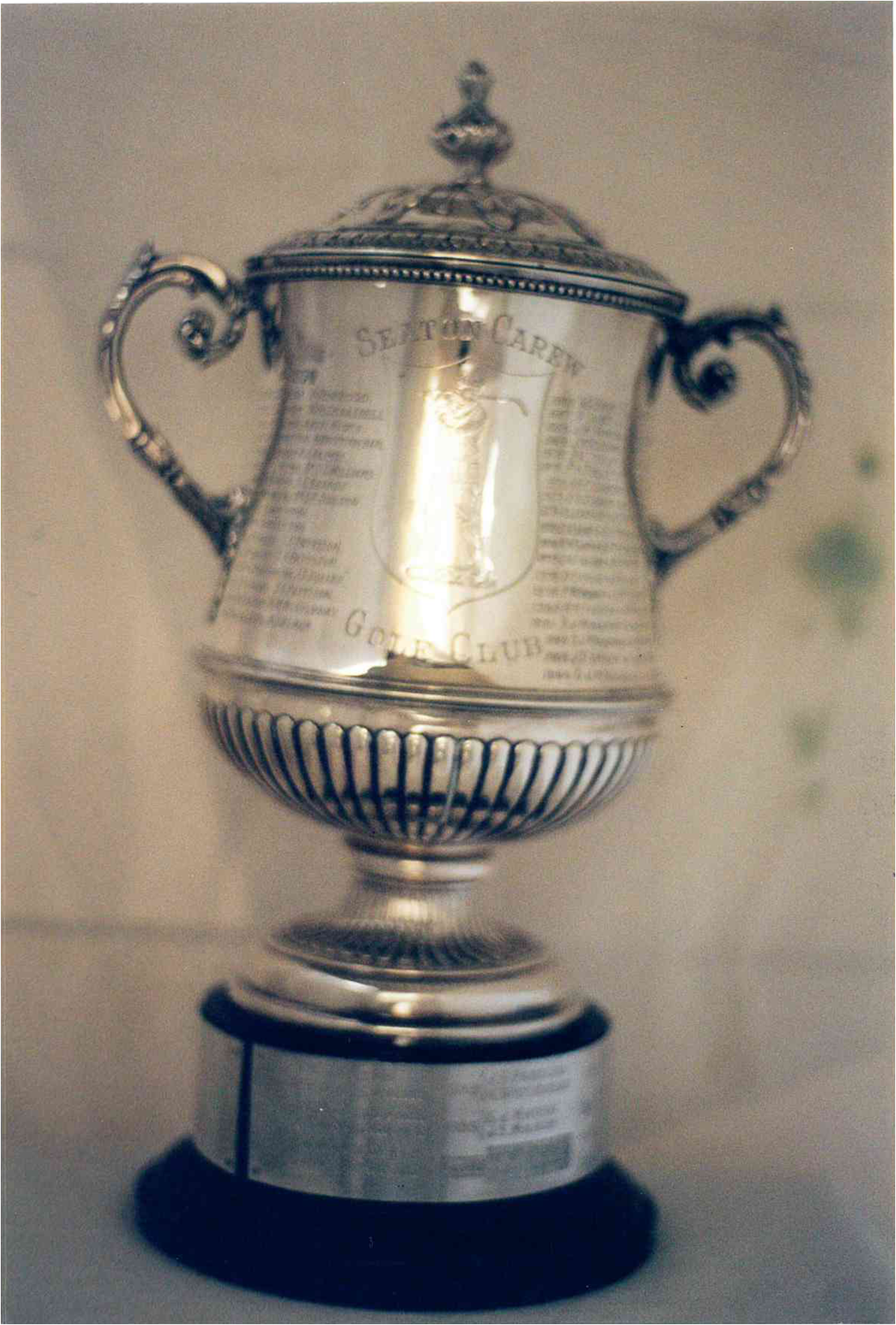
The 5th Gray Trophy a "solid Silver" cup purchased by Major Gray in 1893. Won outright by G Pyman in February 1900. Now used as the "Pyman Cup - Seaton Carew Trophy" at Harrogate Golf Club

- October 1884 – February 1900 winner G. Pyman (Son of the Pyman Ship-owning Magnates)Mr Pyman was a "scratch" player from which the other members of the club had their handicaps calculated by the club committee. Pyman won his third Gray competition, thereby taking the Trophy outright, on a February day that would be recognisable by all Seaton Carew members through the years, it was described in the press as "very cold with a strong NE wind blowing".

Following Mr Pyman's death this the 5th Gray Trophy which is solid silver was donated to Harrogate Golf Club (Starbeck) by his son Noel Pyman when he was elected captain of that club. This is currently known as the "Pyman Cup - The Seaton Carew Trophy" and is competed for during that club's annual winter foursomes.

==== 6th Gray Trophy ====
Again by chance 33 competitions were to be played before the 6th Gray Trophy winner emerged.

- April 1900 – June 1905 winner F.W. Dickinson (Under Manager Barclays Bank, West Hartlepool.)

The 6th Gray Trophy was still owned by Mr Dickinson 50 years later and it was described in a letter dated 22 December 1953 to the then Club Archivist Mr G. Bunting as having "a ball design with clubs as part of the handles, with a figure of a Golfer on top". Mr Dickinson records that he lost his only son in the War and the Trophy may need a home in future years. The whereabouts of this trophy is unknown.

==== 7th Gray Trophy ====
The 7th Gray Trophy was donated by William Cresswell Gray (later Baronet Gray) the younger brother of Matthew and himself a member of the club for several years. William had inherited his fathers fortune of £1.5m in 1898 (worth about £100m today). Golf Club records show William was not as "keen" a golfer as his brother but played at Seaton Carew. William had many business interests including shipbuilding and a large department store called "Gray Peverell" that was to become the department store known well known across the UK during the 20th century as "Binns". This trophy was won after only seven competitions.

- August 1905 – August 1906 winner T. H. Peverell

The widow of Mr Peverell later donated the 7th Gray Trophy back to the golf club in 1953 and it is now presented annually to the Seaton Carew Golf Club Champion.

==== 8th Gray Trophy ====
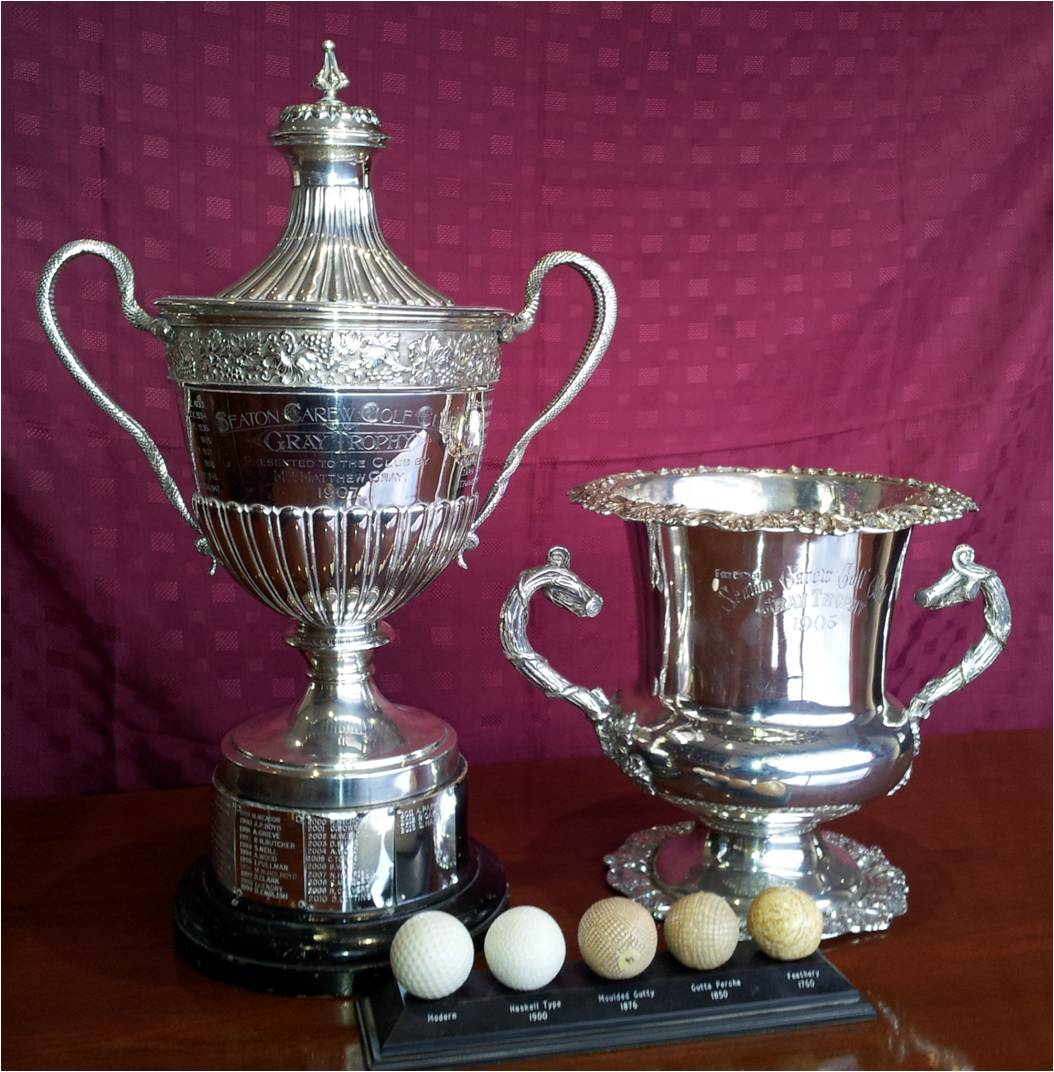
LH 8th Gray Trophy donated 1907 by Mrs Matthew Gray, RH 7th Gray Trophy donated by William Gray 1905 to Seaton Carew Golf Club

The 8th Gray Trophy, is the trophy still played for today and won annually but not retained by the winning golfer. It was donated by Ms Eliza Gray (also known as Jeanie) and engraved as being donated by Mrs Matthew Gray in 1907. This was Matthew Gray's widow and she took a very active part in choosing the design of the trophy, manufactured Goldsmith & Silversmith Company Limited of London. A note in her hand writing, amongst that of the silversmith's correspondence, is in the club's archives and states "I like (designs) No. 3 or 4, being a Golf Trophy, I rather think I like the figure, but I am not particular! I do not like the Golf Ball."

The golf ball comment by Mrs Gray seems to be a reflection of one of the trophy designs presented to her and not any dislike of the game. Mrs Gray on many occasions during her husband's lifetime was present and contributed to the club's social functions. This is mentioned in a number of associated press cuttings from that time, she attended alongside many of the wives of the club members. These records how she and the other ladies "graced" those social and sporting events. Eventually a more classical design was finally agreed for the elegant 8th Gray Trophy that is still very much prized by the members of Seaton Carew Golf Club.

=== Mrs Matthew Gray local benefactor ===
Eliza Gray, like her husband became a considerable local benefactor. In 1914 she made a £500 donation towards the raising of a battalion of the Durham Light Infantry which became known as "The Durham Pals". Mrs Gray died in 1917 at the home that Matthew had purchased for them just before he died suddenly in 1896, The Willows, Clarence Road, Hartlepool. Matthew and Eliza were childless and The Willows was soon after donated to the town of Hartlepool as a museum by Sir William Cresswell Gray, Matthew's brother. This was a gesture of thanksgiving for the safe return of his own son William (1895–1978) from the First World War. The museum was opened to the public in 1920. The Museum of Hartlepool has since moved to purpose-built facilities and The Willows is now an art gallery operated by Hartlepool Borough Council.The publicly owned facility has been renamed Sir William Gray House.

=== The sudden death of Matthew Gray ===
Matthew Gray was born in Hartlepool in 1855 and worked through several technical and business departments at his father's, Sir William Gray's, shipyards and gaining distinctions in his "Oxford & Cambridge examinations". Eventually he became a partner in his father's Hartlepool based shipbuilding business William Gray & Company. Matthew Gray's later business interests specialised in the manufacture of steel plate which complimented his family's ship building interests. In August 1889, for example, he is recorded as being on board during the maiden voyage and sea trials of the S.S. Empress Considerable built by William Gray & Co. Gray also took a keen interest in politics and as staunch Liberal delivered many speeches in support of that political party during the general election the year before his death. These speeches were reported as "marked by great vigour" and showed that he had "a somewhat wide grasp of the political problems of the day". His obituary in the Northern Daily Mail notes that "Mr Gray's liberality to the work-people and those dependent on them will long be remembered. And withal it was characterised with the utmost un-ostentation. Mr Gray was always willing to support by his presence and purse every good effort – whether social, religious or athletic. He was President of the Seaton Carew Golf Club from its commencement, and as our readers will know has long presented a challenge trophy which has been played for regularly". On occasions the Seaton Carew Golf Club was short of funds but its records show that its first president Gray was a considerable benefactor. Especially so during the building of the club house in 1893. In 1886 the club was in the red to the tune of £11 10 shillings and 6 pence but Gray quietly donated a cheque for that sum. Matthew Gray contracted pneumonia after a short illness and died suddenly on 16 June 1896 and pursuant with the Law of Property Amendment Act 1859 his death was formally announced in the London Gazette on 20 November that year. Major Matthew Gray's funeral took place on 19 June 1896 and is reported to have taken place in the presence of thousands of people.

== Seaton Carew Golf Club annual competitions for amateur golfers ==
The results of the following competitions can be found in the club archive dating from the 1880s. The trophies themselves are also well documented in the books by Mr Trotter and Mr Hornby.

=== Men's Open Competition - The Seaton Salver ===
A 36 hole open scratch medal. Played annually since 1969 and the trophy donated by former Cub President J.E.Guthe.

=== Men: Members competitions ===
==== Club Championship ====
A 36 hole scratch medal competition. The trophy currently used for this championship was originally donated to be used as the 7th Gray Trophy by William Cresswell Gray after the sudden death of his brother Matthew. It was won outright by Mr T. H. Peverell in 1906 under the rules of the Gray Trophy competition. The Trophy was given back to the club by Mrs Peverell in 1953.

==== Gray Trophy ====
A 4 X 18 hole handicap medal competition

This trophy commemorates the club's first president Mattew Gray and was first played for on 2 February 1884.

==== Kitching Trophy ====
An 18 hole net medal for players with handicaps 13–20

==== Thomlinson Cup ====
An 18 hole net medal for all handicap categories against bogey

==== Royal and Ancient Quaich ====
An 18 hole net medal for all handicaps

==== The Jack Lithgo Trophy ====
An 18 hole net medal for members over 55

==== The Lytham Trophy ====
An 18 hole net medal for all handicaps

==== Ian Alderson Cup ====
An 18 hole net stableford for all handicaps

==== Calcutta Singles Salver ====
Singles Knockout played under Calcutta handicaps

==== Calcutta Foursomes ====
Foursomes Knockout under Calcutta handicaps

==== Mixed Foursomes Cup ====
Mixed Foursomes Handicap Knockout

==== 4th Division Salver ====
An 18 hole net medal for players with handicaps 21–28

==== 2nd Division Trophy ====
A 36 hole gross medal for players with handicaps 6–12

==== Thomson Medal ====
An 18-hole net medal for all handicaps competed for over the Seaton Links since 24 February 1883, this is a gold medal depicting the symbols of the bishop of Durham and the bishop of York, the club's crest, which was donated by A. A. Thompson whose initials are artistically incorporated into the design.

=== Women: members competitions ===
==== Doris Alderson Cup ====
For 36 Hole Stroke Play

==== Championship Trophy ====
Club Championship

==== Centenary Trophy ====
For 18 Hole Stroke Play

==== Sivewright Trophies ====
Eight eclectic scores March - September

==== Furness Bowl ====
Four best scores from eight rounds of stableford

==== Sargeant Bowl ====
Knockout Mixed Foursomes

==== Tomlinson Cup ====
Knockout Match Play

==== Brighten Trophy ====
Cumulative Points March - October in Competitions held on Thursdays

== The course cards and current record scores at Seaton Carew golf links ==
=== Old Course ===
Record Holder: Adam Best. Competition: Seaton Salver. Date: 15 May 2011

Hole	Name	Length	Par	Score
1	Rocket	360yd	4	3
2	Long Trail	565yd	5	4
3	The Doctor	173yd	3	3
4	Dunes	385yd	4	4
5	Pond	374yd	4	4
6	Bents	441yd	4	4
7	Road	354yd	4	4
8	Jimmy Kay	364yd	4	4
9	Tees	394yd	4	4
out		3410yd	par 36	score 34
10	Lagoon	371yd	4	4
11	Crocodile	325yd	4	3
12	Mashie	169yd	3	3
13	Sand Hills	355yd	4	4
14	Sahara	523yd	5	4
15	Cosy Corner	205yd	3	3
16	Dog Leg	453yd	4	3
17	Snag	398yd	4	4
18	Bill Hector	394yd	4	3
in		3193yd	par 35	score 31
Total		6603yd	par 71	score 65

=== Brabazon Course ===
Record Holder: Ian Garbutt. Competition: English Golf Union Northern Counties. Date: 16 June 1990

Hole	Name	Length	Par	Score
1	Rocket	363yd	4	3
2	Long Trail	555yd	5	5
3	The Doctor	172yd	3	2
4	Dunes	399yd	4	4
5	Pond	385yd	4	3
6	Mashie	165yd	3	2
7	Sandhills	358yd	4	4
8	Road	349yd	4	3
9	Lagoon	363yd	4	4
out		3109yd	par 35	score 30
10	Gare	394yd	4	4
11	Chapel Open	477yd	5	4
12	Beach	390yd	4	5
13	Whins	537yd	5	5
14	Sahara	537yd	5	4
15	Cosy Corner	208yd	3	2
16	Dog Leg	434yd	4	4
17	Snag	413yd	4	4
18	Bill Hector (Home)	375yd	4	4
in		3740yd	par 38	score 36
Total		6849yd	par 73	score 66

=== Micklem Course ===
Record Holder: Oliver Wilson. Competition: English Boys Amateur Strokeplay Championship. Date: 25 July 1996

Hole	Name	Length	Par	Score
1	Rocket	358yd	4	4
2	Long Trail	560yd	5	4
3	The Doctor	168yd	3	3
4	Dunes	385yd	4	3
5	Pond	373yd	4	3
6	Mashie	165	3	3
7	Sand Hills	354yd	4	4
8	Road	355yd	4	4
9	Jimmy Kay	364yd	4	4
out		3446yd	par 35	score 32
10	Tees	391yd	4	3
11	Lagoon	371yd	4	4
12	Gare	390yd	4	4
13	Chapel Open	471yd	5	4
14	Beach	386yd	4	4
15	Cosy Corner	203yd	3	3
16	Dog Leg	445yd	4	4
17	Snag	397yd	4	5
18	Bill Hector (Home)	392yd	4	3
in		3082yd	par 36	score 34
Total		6528yd	par 71	score 66

=== Bishop Course ===
Record Holder: Hugh Hamilton. Competition: Singles Stableford. Date: 10 September 2000

Hole	Name	Length	Par	Score
1	Rocket	358yd	4	3
2	Long Trail	560yd	5	4
3	Pond	373yd	4	4
4	Bents	490yd	5	4
5	Road	355yd	4	4
6	Jimmy Kay	364yd	4	4
7	Tees	391yd	4	4
8	Lagoon	371yd	4	4
9	Crocodile	326yd	4	4
out		3588yd	par 38	score 35
10	Mashie	165yd	3	3
11	Sandhills	354yd	4	3
12	Gare	390yd	4	4
13	Chapel Open	471yd	4	4
14	Beach	386yd	5	4
15	Cosy Corner	203yd	3	4
16	Dog Leg	445yd	4	4
17	Snag	397yd	4	4
18	Bill Hector (Home)	392yd	4	4
in		3203yd	par 35	score 34
Total		6791yd	par 73	score 69

=== New Course Card Only ===
This course layout does not yet have a course record associated with it.

Hole	Name	Length	Par	Score
1	Rocket	363yd	4	
2	Long Trail	553yd	5	
3	Doctor	172	3	
4	Dunes	399yd	4	
5	Pond	385yd	4	
6	Bents	427yd	4	
7	Gare	349yd	4	
8	Chapel Open	533yd	5	
9	Beach	390yd	4	
out		3616yd	par 37	
10	Whins	563yd	5	
11	Sahara	512yd	5	
12	Cosey Corner	208yd	3	
13	Sand Hills	358yd	4	
14	Crocodile	232yd	4	
15	Mashie	165yd	3	
16	Dog Leg	434yd	4	
17	Snag	413yd	4	
18	Bill Hector (Home)	375yd	4	
in		3260yd	par 35	
Total		6876yd	par 72	

== See also ==
- English Golf Union
- List of links golf courses
- List of golf courses in the United Kingdom
