= Andrew Kirkaldy =

Andrew Kirkaldy may refer to:

- Andrew Kirkaldy (golfer) (1860–1934), Scottish professional golfer
- Andrew Kirkaldy (racing driver) (born 1976), Scottish racing driver and team principal
