= Willie More =

English golfer and coach

Personal information
- Full name: William David Maxwell More
- Nationality: England
- Born: 1868 London, England
- Died: 28 June 1902 (aged 34) Woodend, Victoria, Australia

Career
- Sport: Golf
- Turned professional: c. 1886

Best results in major championships
- Masters Tournament: DNP
- PGA Championship: DNP
- U.S. Open: DNP
- The Open Championship: 5th: 1891

William David Maxwell More (1868 – 28 June 1902) was an English professional golfer and coach. More finished in fifth place in the 1891 Open Championship and took home £4 as his share of the purse. More carded rounds of 84-87=171, only five shots behind the 166 score posted by Hugh Kirkaldy who won the tournament.

== Early life ==
William More was born in London, England, in 1868.

== Golf career ==
=== 1891 Open Championship ===
The 1891 Open Championship was held 6 October at the Old Course at St Andrews, Fife, Scotland. Hugh Kirkaldy was victorious by two strokes from his brother Andrew Kirkaldy and Willie Fernie. This was the last Open Championship contested in a single day over 36 holes. The 1892 Open was contested over 72 holes played on two successive days.

== Death ==
More suffered from ill health and emigrated, firstly to South Africa and then to Australia where he died in 1902 at the age of 34.
