= William Auchterlonie =

Scottish golfer (1872–1963)

Willie Auchterlonie
- Auchterlonie, c. 1897

Personal information
- Full name: William Auchterlonie
- Nationality: Scotland
- Born: 7 August 1872 St Andrews, Scotland
- Died: 27 February 1963 (aged 90) Kirkcaldy, Scotland

Career
- Sport: Golf
- Status: Professional

Best results in major championships (wins: 1)
- Masters Tournament: DNP
- PGA Championship: DNP
- U.S. Open: DNP
- The Open Championship: Won: 1893

William "Willie" Auchterlonie (7 August 1872 – 27 February 1963) was a Scottish professional golfer.

== Early life ==
Auchterlonie was a native of St Andrews.

== Professional career ==
He won the 1893 Open Championship at the age of 21 years and 25 days and he remains the second youngest Open Champion after Tom Morris, Jnr, but it was to prove to be his only Open. His brother, Laurie Auchterlonie, won the 1902 U.S. Open.

Auchterlonie was honorary professional to The Royal and Ancient Golf Club of St Andrews for nearly a quarter of a century. He had begun his working life as an apprentice to the club makers R. Forgan & Son and he ran club making businesses for most of his adult life. There is still a golf shop called Auchterlonie's in St Andrews. He was involved in golf course design.

== Major championships ==
=== Wins (1) ===
Year	Championship	54 holes	Winning score	Margin	Runner-up
1893	The Open Championship	1 shot lead	78-81-81-82=322	2 strokes	(Scotland) Johnny Laidlay (a)

=== Results timeline ===
Tournament	1888	1889	1890	1891	1892	1893	1894	1895	1896	1897	1898	1899
The Open Championship	T18			T8		1	T23	T31	T12	T18	CUT	

Tournament	1900	1901	1902	1903	1904	1905	1906	1907	1908	1909	1910
The Open Championship	5	T29	T38	T45		CUT	CUT				T28

Note: Auchterlonie only played in The Open Championship.

Win
Top 10
Did not play

CUT = missed the half-way cut
"T" indicates a tie for a place
