= John Ball (golfer) =

English amateur golfer (1861–1940)

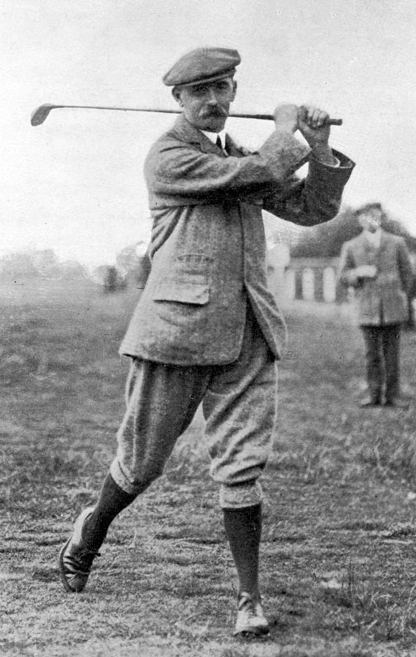

Personal information
- Full name: John Ball Jr
- Nationality: England
- Born: 24 December 1861 Hoylake, England
- Died: 2 December 1940 (aged 78) Holywell, Wales

Career
- Sport: Golf
- Status: Amateur

Best results in major championships (wins: 9)
- The Open Championship: Won: 1890
- British Amateur: Won: 1888, 1890, 1892, 1894, 1899, 1907, 1910, 1912

Achievements and awards
- World Golf Hall of Fame: 1977 (member page)

John Ball Jr (24 December 1861 – 2 December 1940) was an English amateur golfer of the late 19th and early 20th century. He was the first player from outside Scotland to win a major golf championship, winning the 1890 Open Championship.

== Early life ==
Ball was born in Hoylake, Cheshire (now Merseyside). His father was the prosperous owner of the Royal Hotel, located near the Royal Liverpool Golf Club, in Hoylake. Ball grew up playing golf as a youth on the Royal Liverpool course, which was established in his early boyhood.

In 1878, at the age of 16, Ball finished fifth in The Open at Prestwick. His run of Amateur titles began in 1888 and stretched until 1912, when he was 51 years old. His best year was 1890, when he won both the Amateur and Open Championships. Bobby Jones, who won the Grand Slam in 1930, is the only other golfer in history to win those two tournaments in the same year.

== Golf career ==
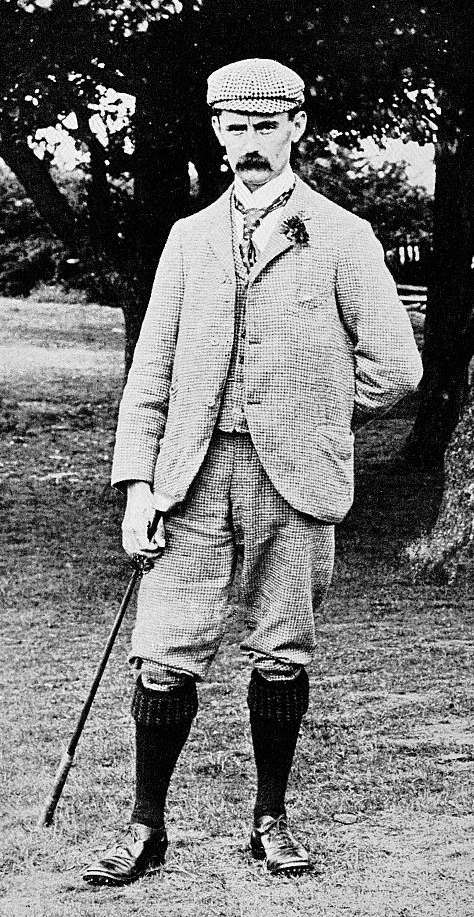
Ball c. 1900

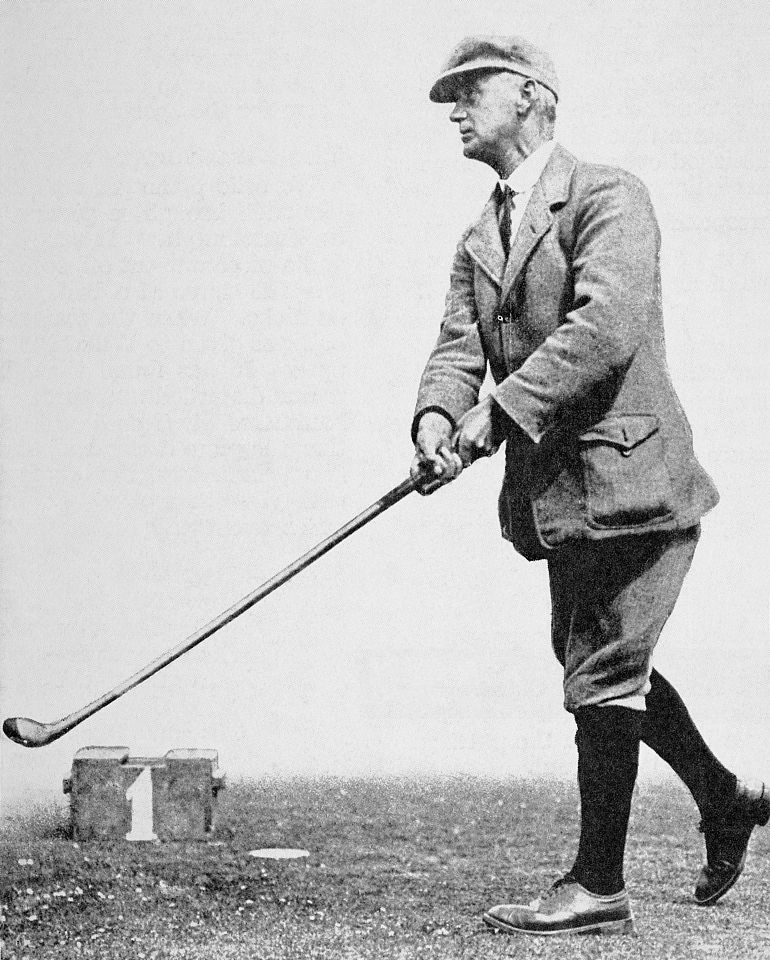
Ball in 1913

After winning The Amateur Championship in 1888, Ball became the first English-born player to win The Open Championship in 1890, and in the same year won his second Amateur, the first to win both titles in the same year. Ball subsequently won the 1892, 1894, 1899, 1907, 1910, and 1912 Amateurs, a record eight titles in all, in addition to two runner-up finishes. Ball also won four Irish Amateur titles. He retired with a 99–22 record (81.8%) at The Amateur Championship. Ball was also runner-up in the 1892 Open Championship, finishing three strokes behind Harold Hilton.

Ball dominated amateur golf in Great Britain. He won all the important golf championships as well as the hearts and respect of his country. In the words of British golf historian Donald Steele, "No golfer ever came to be more of a legend in his own lifetime."

Although he gripped the club tightly in the palms of both hands, Ball's swing was the most graceful and stylish of his era. Bernard Darwin wrote, "I have derived greater aesthetic and emotional pleasure from watching John Ball than from any other spectacle in the game." Ball learned the game competing against Harold Hilton on the links at Hoylake. In 1878, at the age of 16, he competed in his first Open Championship and finished fourth at Prestwick. Ball was famous for refusing to carry a niblick, which had the loft of a modern-day 8- or 9-iron. He scorned the use of that club, describing it as "another bloody spade," and admonished the Rules of Golf Committee of the Royal and Ancient for permitting such horrid-looking contraptions to be allowed in competition. In a bunker, Ball would simply lay open the blade of a mid-iron and float the ball toward the hole with a smooth swing. He disliked the introduction of the increasing number of shallow cross bunkers to many courses, often parkland courses, calling them in derisory terms, ' geranium beds'.

It was this stubbornness and dogged determination that made Ball such a lion in match play. Darwin once noted that Ball had "a strong vein of hostility and if he wanted a particular player's blood, he would fight his way through a tournament with the sole object of getting at him." Darwin added, "That was not a personal hostility, but rather a desire to measure himself against a foe really worthy of him."

Words from Ball are hard to find. He was a shy, modest man who went about his business promptly without wasted motion. In his book, Sixty Years of Golf, Robert Harris wrote that "John's soft, whispering voice, his stoicism, his pawky jibs at easy rules and innovations, his relentless criticism of moderns with their fuss, and his total outlook on the game, were the very essence of golf."

== Death and legacy ==
Ball died in Holywell, Wales, on 2 December 1940. Ball served his country during the Second Boer War. He was inducted into the World Golf Hall of Fame in 1977, and in 2018 a blue plaque was installed at Royal Liverpool Golf Club to commemorate his achievements.

== Tournament wins ==
Note: This list may be incomplete.

- 1888 The Amateur Championship, St. George's Challenge Cup
- 1889 St. George's Challenge Cup
- 1890 The Amateur Championship, St. George's Challenge Cup, The Open Championship
- 1891 St. George's Challenge Cup
- 1892 The Amateur Championship
- 1893 Irish Amateur Open Championship,
- 1894 The Amateur Championship, Irish Amateur Open Championship
- 1899 The Amateur Championship, Irish Amateur Open Championship,
- 1907 The Amateur Championship
- 1910 The Amateur Championship
- 1912 The Amateur Championship

=== Club competitions ===
- Royal Liverpool Golf Club
  - 1881 Autumn Dowie Silver Cup Medal, Autumn Kennard Gold Medal, St. Andrews Day Gold Cross
  - 1882 Club Spring Gold Medal, Spring Connaught Challenge Star Medal, Autumn Dowie Silver Cup Medal, Autumn Kennard Gold Medal
  - 1883 Club Spring Gold Medal, Summer Lubbock Gold Medal, Autumn Kennard Gold Medal, St. Andrews Day Gold Cross
  - 1884 Spring Connaught Challenge Star Medal, Summer Lubbock Gold Medal, Autumn Dowie Silver Cup Medal
  - 1885 Club Spring Gold Medal, Summer Lubbock Gold Medal, Autumn Dowie Silver Cup Medal, Autumn Kennard Gold Medal
  - 1886 Summer Lubbock Gold Medal, Autumn Dowie Silver Cup Medal, Autumn Kennard Gold Medal, St. Andrews Day Gold Cross
  - 1887 Club Spring Gold Medal, Spring Connaught Challenge Star Medal, Summer Lubbock Gold Medal, Autumn Dowie Silver Cup Medal, Autumn Kennard Gold Medal, St. Andrews Day Gold Cross, Spring Challenge Vase, Spring Muir Jug
  - 1889 Club Spring Gold Medal, Spring Connaught Challenge Star Medal, Autumn Dowie Silver Cup Medal
  - 1892 Club Spring Gold Medal, Spring Connaught Challenge Star Medal, Autumn Dowie Silver Cup Medal, Autumn Kennard Gold Medal, St. Andrews Day Gold Cross
  - 1893 Summer Lubbock Gold Medal, St. Andrews Day Gold Cross, Silver Bowl
- Leasowe Golf Club
  - 1899 Harvie Prize, Captain's Prize

== Major championships ==
=== Professional wins (1) ===
Year	Championship	18 holes	Winning score	Margin	Runners-up
1890	The Open Championship	1 shot deficit	82-82=164	3 strokes	(Scotland) Willie Fernie, (Scotland) Archie Simpson

=== Amateur wins (8) ===
Year	Championship	Winning score	Runner-up
1888	The Amateur Championship	5 & 4	(Scotland) Johnny Laidlay
1890	The Amateur Championship	4 & 3	(Scotland) Johnny Laidlay
1892	The Amateur Championship	3 & 1	(England) Harold Hilton
1894	The Amateur Championship	1 up	(Scotland) Samuel Mure Fergusson
1899	The Amateur Championship	37 holes	(Scotland) Frederick Guthrie Tait
1907	The Amateur Championship	6 & 4	(England) C. A. Palmer
1910	The Amateur Championship	10 & 9	(England) Colin Aylmer
1912	The Amateur Championship	38 holes	(England) Abe Mitchell

=== Results timeline ===
Tournament	1878	1879
The Open Championship	T4 LA	

Tournament	1880	1881	1882	1883	1884	1885	1886	1887	1888	1889
The Open Championship						WD				
The Amateur Championship	NYF	NYF	NYF	NYF	NYF	SF	SF	2	1	SF

Tournament	1890	1891	1892	1893	1894	1895	1896	1897	1898	1899
The Open Championship	1 LA	T11	T2	T8	T13	T18		17		T25
The Amateur Championship	1	R32	1	R16	1	2	QF	R64	QF	1

Tournament	1900	1901	1902	1903	1904	1905	1906	1907	1908	1909
The Open Championship			T15		18		T35	T15	T13 LA	
The Amateur Championship			R64	QF	R16	R128	R64	1	R128	R128

Tournament	1910	1911	1912	1913	1914	1915	1916	1917	1918	1919
The Open Championship	T19 LA	CUT				NT	NT	NT	NT	NT
The Amateur Championship	1	R32	1	R256	R64	NT	NT	NT	NT	NT

Tournament	1920	1921	1922	1923	1924	1925	1926	1927
The Open Championship								
The Amateur Championship		R16						R128

Note: Ball only played in The Open Championship and The Amateur Championship.

Win
Top 10
Did not play

LA = Low amateur
NYF = Tournament not yet founded
NT = No tournament
CUT = missed the half-way cut
WD = withdrew
"T" indicates a tie for a place
R256, R128, R64, R32, R16, QF, SF = Round in which player lost in match play

== Team appearances ==
- England–Scotland Amateur Match (representing England): 1902, 1903 (winners), 1904, 1905, 1906, 1907, 1908, 1909, 1910 (winners), 1911, 1912
- Coronation Match (representing the Amateurs): 1911

== Sources ==
- Open Championship: opengolf.com
- 1885 Amateur: The Glasgow Herald, 24 April 1885, p. 8.
- 1886 Amateur: The Glasgow Herald, 24 September 1886, p. 5.
- 1889 Amateur: The Glasgow Herald, 10 May 1889, p. 10.
- 1891 Amateur: The Glasgow Herald, 8 May 1891, p. 10.
- 1893 Amateur: The Glasgow Herald, 11 May 1893, p. 12.
- 1896 Amateur: The Glasgow Herald, 22 May 1896, p. 10.
- 1897 Amateur: The Glasgow Herald, 28 April 1897, p. 10.
- 1898 Amateur: The Glasgow Herald, 27 May 1898, p. 11.
- 1902 Amateur: Golf, June 1902, p. 397.
- 1903 Amateur: Golf, July 1903, p. 10.
- 1904 Amateur: Golf, July 1904, p. 8.
- 1905 Amateur: Golf, June 1905, p. 340.
- 1906 Amateur: Golf, July 1906, p. 29.
- 1908 Amateur: The Glasgow Herald, 27 May 1908, p. 14.
- 1909 Amateur: The American Golfer, Jul, 1909, p. 11. Archived 24 February 2012 at the Wayback Machine
- 1911 Amateur: The Glasgow Herald, 1 June 1911, p. 10.
- 1913 Amateur: The American Golfer, July 1913, p. 222. Archived 7 August 2010 at the Wayback Machine
- 1914 Amateur: Golf Illustrated, July 1914, p. 27.
- 1921 Amateur: The American Golfer, 4 June 1921, p. 24.
- 1927 Amateur: The American Golfer, July 1927, p. 66. Archived 10 May 2011 at the Wayback Machine
