= Johnny Laidlay =

Scottish golfer

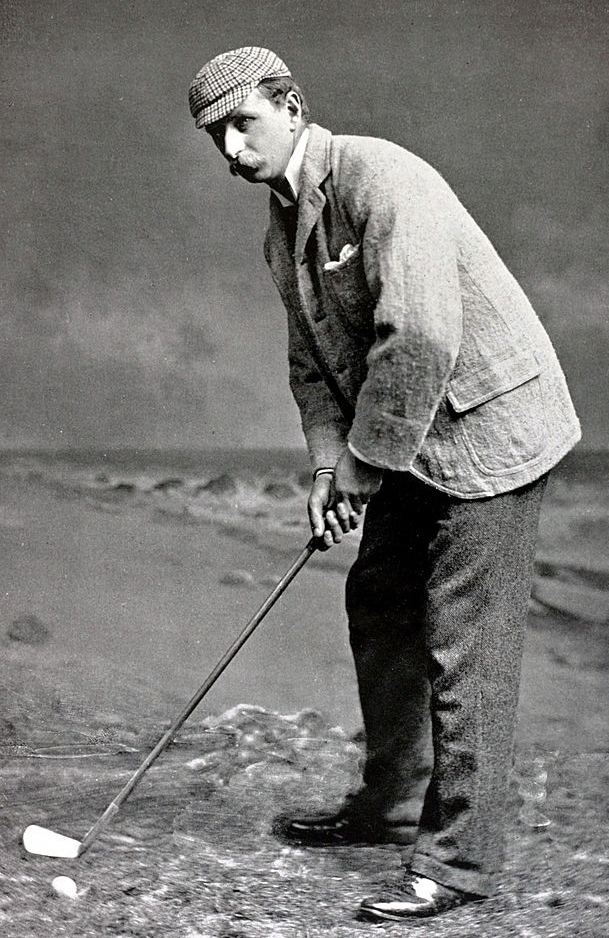
- Laidlay, c. 1895

Personal information
- Full name: John Ernest Laidlay
- Nationality: Scotland
- Born: 5 November 1860 Seacliff, East Lothian, Scotland
- Died: 15 July 1940 (aged 79) Sunningdale, Berkshire, England

Career
- Sport: Golf
- Status: Amateur

Best results in major championships (wins: 2)
- U.S. Open: DNP
- The Open Championship: 2nd: 1893
- U.S. Amateur: DNP
- British Amateur: Won: 1889, 1891

John Ernest Laidlay (5 November 1860 – 15 July 1940) was a Scottish amateur golfer. He invented the most popular golf grip used today, although the grip is credited to Harry Vardon, who took it up after Laidlay.

== Early life ==
Laidlay was born in Seacliff, two miles east of North Berwick, East Lothian, the son of John Watson Laidlay FRSE. His brother was the cricketer and artist, William Laidlay. He became quite prominent at golf while a schoolboy from 1872 to 1878 at the Loretto School in Musselburgh, near Edinburgh. Following completion of his education at Loretto, he moved to North Berwick and played out of the famous North Berwick Golf Club.

== Golf career ==
=== British Amateur Championship ===
Laidlay won the British Amateur Championship twice, in 1889 and 1891, and was runner-up three more times, in 1888, 1890, and 1893, during a six-year stretch from 1888 to 1893. He was also runner-up in the 1893 Open Championship. He won over 130 amateur medals during his playing career, represented Scotland every year from 1902 to 1911, and also played cricket for Scotland. After World War I, he moved to Sunningdale, near London, where his former caddie Jack White was the club professional at the Sunningdale Golf Club. He has been called the 'last of the gentlemen golfers'.

=== Overlapping grip ===
Laidlay was using the grip which was credited to Harry Vardon for some years before either Vardon or J.H. Taylor adopted it. The grip is taken by overlapping the little finger of the bottom hand between the forefinger and middle fingers of the top hand, with thumbs pointing down and the remaining fingers of both hands wrapping around the club, with the club held lightly. The lead thumb should fit into the palm, along the lifeline of the trailing hand. Since 1900, most professionals, top amateurs, and average players around the world have adopted this grip, known as the Vardon or overlapping grip. Probably 90% of the world's golfers use it, although there are exceptions, including Jack Nicklaus, Tiger Woods, and Gene Sarazen.

Laidlay also played one match for the Scotland national cricket team in 1878.

== Death and legacy ==
Laidlay died on 15 July 1940 at Sunningdale, England. He is best remembered as a 2-time winner of the British Amateur Championship and the first golfer to employ the overlapping grip.

== Major championships ==
=== Amateur wins (2) ===
Year	Championship	Winning score	Runner-up
1889	The Amateur Championship	2 & 1	(Scotland) Leslie Balfour-Melville
1891	The Amateur Championship	20 holes	(England) Harold Hilton

=== Results timeline ===
Tournament	1885	1886	1887	1888	1889
The Open Championship	T13	T8 LA	4 LA	10	T4 LA
The Amateur Championship	R24	QF		2	1

Tournament	1890	1891	1892	1893	1894	1895	1896	1897	1898	1899
The Open Championship	T11	T20		2 LA		17	T18	29		32
The Amateur Championship	2	1	SF	2	SF	R16	R16	R64		R16

Tournament	1900	1901	1902	1903	1904	1905	1906	1907	1908	1909
The Open Championship	T26	T7		T37			T60			
The Amateur Championship	R16	R32	R16	R64	SF	R64	R32	R256	R128	R16

Tournament	1910	1911	1912	1913	1914	1915	1916	1917	1918	1919
The Open Championship						NT	NT	NT	NT	NT
The Amateur Championship	R32	R64		R64	R128	NT	NT	NT	NT	NT

Tournament	1920
The Open Championship	
The Amateur Championship	R64

Note: Laidlay only played in The Open Championship and The Amateur Championship.

Win
Top 10
Did not play

LA = Low amateur
NT = No tournament
"T" indicates a tie for a place
R256, R128, R64, R32, R16, QF, SF = Round in which player lost in match play

== Team appearances ==
- England–Scotland Amateur Match (representing Scotland): 1902 (winners), 1903, 1904 (winners), 1905 (winners), 1906 (winners), 1907 (winners), 1908 (winners), 1909 (winners), 1910, 1911 (winners)

== Sources ==
- British Open: www.opengolf.com
- 1885 British Amateur: The Glasgow Herald, April 21, 1885, p. 7.
- 1886 British Amateur: The Glasgow Herald, September 23, 1886, p. 5.
- 1892 British Amateur: The Glasgow Herald, May 14, 1892, p. 4.
- 1894 British Amateur: The Glasgow Herald, April 28, 1894, p. 11.
- 1895 British Amateur: The Glasgow Herald, May 9, 1895, p. 3.
- 1896 British Amateur: The Glasgow Herald, May 21, 1896, p. 11.
- 1897 British Amateur: The Glasgow Herald, April 28, 1897, p. 10.
- 1899 British Amateur: The Glasgow Herald, May 25, 1899, p. 8.
- 1900 British Amateur: Golf, July, 1900, p. 21.
- 1901 British Amateur: Golf, June, 1901, p. 413.
- 1902 British Amateur: Golf, June, 1902, p. 397.
- 1903 British Amateur: Golf, July, 1903, p. 8.
- 1904 British Amateur: Golf, July, 1904, p. 9.
- 1905 British Amateur: Golf, June, 1905, p. 341.
- 1906 British Amateur: Golf, July, 1906, p. 30.
- 1907 British Amateur: The Glasgow Herald, May 28, 1907, p. 12.
- 1908 British Amateur: The Glasgow Herald, May 27, 1908, p. 14.
- 1909 British Amateur: The Glasgow Herald, May 27, 1909, p. 13.
- 1910 British Amateur: The Glasgow Herald, June 2, 1910, p. 8.
- 1911 British Amateur: The Glasgow Herald, May 31, 1911, p. 10.
- 1913 British Amateur: The Glasgow Herald, May 28, 1913, p. 15.
- 1914 British Amateur: The Glasgow Herald, May 20, 1914, p. 12.
- 1920 British Amateur: The Glasgow Herald, June 9, 1920, p. 11.
