= Willie Park Jr. =

Scottish golfer (1864–1925)

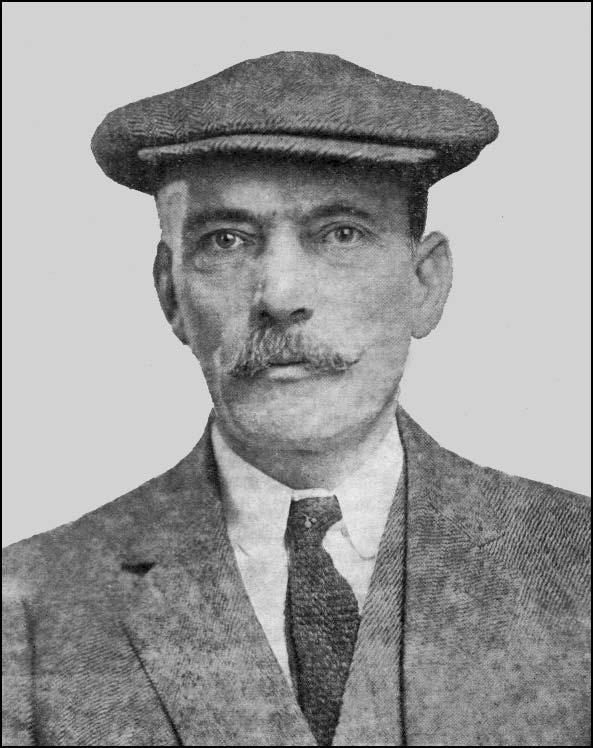

Personal information
- Full name: William Park Jr.
- Nationality: Scotland
- Born: 4 February 1864 Musselburgh, Scotland
- Died: 22 May 1925 (aged 61) Edinburgh, Scotland

Career
- Sport: Golf
- Status: Professional

Best results in major championships (wins: 2)
- Masters Tournament: NYF
- PGA Championship: DNP
- U.S. Open: CUT: 1919
- The Open Championship: Won: 1887, 1889

Achievements and awards
- World Golf Hall of Fame: 2013 (member page)

William Park Jr. (4 February 1864 – 22 May 1925) was a Scottish professional golfer. He won The Open Championship twice. Park was also a successful golf equipment maker and golf writer. In his later years, Park built a significant career as one of the world's best golf course architects, with a worldwide business. He was inducted into the World Golf Hall of Fame in 2013.

== Early years ==
Park was born in Musselburgh, Scotland, on 4 February 1864. His father, Willie Park Sr., was one of Scotland's top golfers, winning the first Open Championship in 1860, and three further Open Championship titles. Park Jr. learned golf from childhood. His father also ran a successful golf equipment business, producing clubs and balls to order. Park Sr. also played challenge matches for stakes, and competed in professional tournaments.

The Musselburgh Links course in the family's home town was one of the main centres of golf at the time, and was on the rota for The Open Championship from 1873 to 1891. In 1892 it was removed from the rota in favor of Muirfield, a new course which became the home of the Honourable Company of Edinburgh Golfers. Mungo Park, younger brother of Park Sr., also won the Open in 1874. The Park family had a deep and fierce golf rivalry, both in competition and in business, with the Morris family (led by Old Tom Morris and Young Tom Morris) of St. Andrews during most of the 19th century.

== Open champion ==
Park caddied and played golf professionally, in stakes matches and tournaments, from his mid-teens. He developed his golf skills and played in his first Open Championship in 1880, at age 16, at which time he was already one of Scotland's best players. He worked in the family golf equipment business. Park won the Open in 1887 and 1889. In the latter year he was taken to a playoff by Andrew Kirkaldy. During his competitive career, Park placed in the top ten 12 times at the Open, and was out of the top eight only twice between 1881 and 1892. He was notable for his excellent short game, which compensated for a sometimes unreliable long game. He is famous for the saying: "A man who can putt is a match for anyone."

== Businessman ==
At the time, it was very difficult, if not impossible, for a golfer to make a living from prize money alone. Park often played challenge matches. He took over the family ball and club making business, establishing an export business just when golf was beginning to spread internationally. He patented several golf club designs.

== Golf writer ==
Park's The Game of Golf (1896) was the first book about golf written by a professional golfer. It was well received, and has proven continuously popular since, being available in a modern, unabridged edition from Arcturus Publishers (2010). Park's second book, The Art of Putting, was published in 1920.

== Golf course architect ==
He also worked as a golf course designer, with 170 designs to his credit in the British Isles, Europe, the US and Canada. Park entered this profession, while winding down his competitive play, in his mid-30s, just as golf was beginning an enormous increase in popularity, in both the British Isles and especially North America. New golfers needed new courses to play, and Park took advantage of the opportunities. His services were much in demand, and he became one of the first people, along with fellow Scot Donald Ross, to become a full-time golf course architect.

=== United Kingdom designs ===
Park's first well-known design was the Old Course of the Sunningdale Golf Club near London, just at the turn of the 20th century. This club's brilliant success on heathland property, which earlier had been thought unsuitable for golf, brought him worldwide fame. Sunningdale Old has frequently been ranked among the world's top courses.

Park designed Temple Links, now Temple Golf Club, in Hurley, Berkshire, in 1909. He routed the course over rolling chalk downs, giving wide views of the surrounding countryside. Donald Steel described it as "challenging enough to keep good players at full stretch without diminishing the enjoyment of the rank and file".

=== Canadian designs ===
Park's highly regarded course designs in Canada include Brightwood Golf & Country Club, Dartmouth, Nova Scotia (host of the 1954 Canadian Women's Championship), co-designed with Donald Ross; the Weston Golf and Country Club in Toronto (host of the 1955 Canadian Open, Arnold Palmer's first professional victory); the Ottawa Hunt and Golf Club in Ottawa, Ontario (host of the 1994, 2008, 2017 and 2022 Canadian Women's Opens); the Calgary Golf and Country Club in Calgary, the Mount Bruno Golf Club in suburban Montreal and Le Club Laval-sur-le-Lac in Laval, Québec.

The Weston G&CC hosts an annual elite amateur Men's "Willie Park, Jr. Memorial" tournament, held over 36 holes on one day in late summer. The "Willie Park, Jr." was initiated in 1925 to memorialize Park's passing in May 1925.

=== United States designs ===
Park's well-known United States courses include Chartiers Country Club in Pittsburgh, Pennsylvania, the Hot Springs Country Club in Hot Springs, Arkansas, the Rolling Road Golf Club in Catonsville, Maryland, the Maidstone Golf Club on Long Island, Country Club of New Canaan in New Canaan, Connecticut, Woodway Country Club in Darien, Connecticut, the New Haven Country Club in Hamden, Connecticut, Madison Country Club, Madison, Connecticut, Pawtucket Country Club in Pawtucket, Rhode Island, Sylvania Country Club in Sylvania, Ohio Shorehaven Golf Club in Norwalk, Connecticut, TumbleBrook Country Club in Bloomfield, Connecticut, Red Run Golf Club in Royal Oak, Michigan, Flint Golf Club in Flint, Michigan, Shuttle Meadow Country Club in Kensington, Connecticut, the North Course of the Olympia Fields Country Club near Chicago (host of two U.S. Open (golf) events (1928 and 2003), as well as the 1961 PGA Championship), Berkshire Country Club in Reading, Pennsylvania and Glen Ridge Country Club in Glen Ridge, New Jersey. Massachusetts, The Milton Hoosic Club. Bellefonte Country Club in Ashland, Country Club of New Bedford (1902) in Dartmouth, MA. Kentucky (Home of the longest continuously played AJGA event). Battle Creek Country Club (Battle Creek, Michigan) holds an annual Symetra Tour event, and Dustin Johnson qualified for his first US Open there. Philmont Country Club in Huntingdon Valley, Pennsylvania, which hosted a Nike Tour event. He also laid out the original six holes of The Sadaquada Club (1895) in Whitestown, NY, which were later improved to a full nine by Horace Rawlins, the first winner of the U.S. Open. He also made a stop in State College, Pennsylvania in 1922 laying out plans for the schools White Course which reopened in 1926. The only remaining holes are 6-14. Six was originally a par3 now plays as a dog leg par-5.

Park designed Moonbrook Country Club in Jamestown NY as well as the Castine Golf Club in Castine, Maine in 1921. However, his final design would be a nine-hole course, St. Johnsbury Country Club in 1923 located in St. Johnsbury Vermont. His brother Mungo Park had to go to Vermont to finish the construction after Willie Park Jr. became ill and returned to Scotland.

== Family ==
Park's daughter, golfer Doris Park, was runner-up in the 1937 British Ladies Amateur Championship.

== Death ==
Overwork on his design business led to a decline in health and his eventual death, at age 61 on 22 May 1925. His health had been in decline for some time; Park knew he was dying, and traveled home from the United States to Scotland, in order to die in his home country. He died in Edinburgh, although his "usual residence" was given as Musselburgh.

== Major championships ==
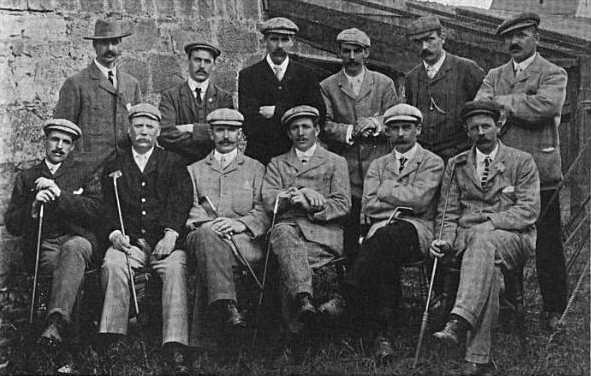
A group photo of Scotland's 1903 international golf team. Park is standing in the back row, second from the right. They defeated the English team that year.

=== Wins (2) ===
Year	Championship	18 holes	Winning score	Margin	Runner-up
1887	The Open Championship	5 shot deficit	82-79=161	1 stroke	(Scotland) Bob Martin
1889	The Open Championship (2)	1 shot deficit	39-38-39-39=155	Playoff ^{1}	(Scotland) Andrew Kirkaldy

^{1} Park defeated Kirkaldy by five strokes in a 36-hole playoff.

=== Results timeline ===
Tournament	1880	1881	1882	1883	1884	1885	1886	1887	1888	1889
The Open Championship	16	T5	T18	8	T4	T4	T4	1	T11	1

Tournament	1890	1891	1892	1893	1894	1895	1896	1897	1898	1899
The Open Championship	T4	6	7	T19	12		T14	T22	2	14

Tournament	1900	1901	1902	1903	1904	1905	1906	1907	1908	1909
The Open Championship	6	T18	T23	T15	T12	T13		WD		

Tournament	1910	1911	1912	1913	1914	1915	1916	1917	1918	1919
U.S. Open								NT	NT	CUT
The Open Championship	T38	CUT				NT	NT	NT	NT	NT

Note: Park only played in The Open Championship and the U.S. Open.

Win
Top 10
Did not play

NT = No tournament
WD = Withdrew
CUT = missed the half-way cut
"T" indicates a tie for a place

== Team appearances ==
- England–Scotland Professional Match (representing Scotland): 1903 (winners), 1904 (tie), 1905 (tie), 1907, 1910
