= Andrew Kirkaldy (golfer) =

Scottish golfer

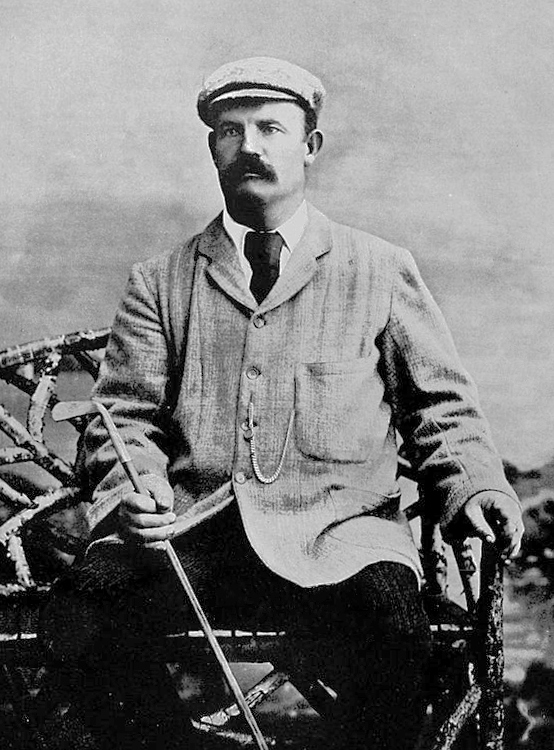
- Kirkaldy, c. 1895

Personal information
- Nickname: Andra
- Nationality: Scotland
- Born: 18 March 1860 Scotland
- Died: 16 April 1934 (aged 74)
- Spouse: Annie McLeod
- Children: 3

Career
- Sport: Golf
- Turned professional: c. 1877

Best results in major championships
- Masters Tournament: DNP
- PGA Championship: DNP
- U.S. Open: DNP
- The Open Championship: 2nd: 1889

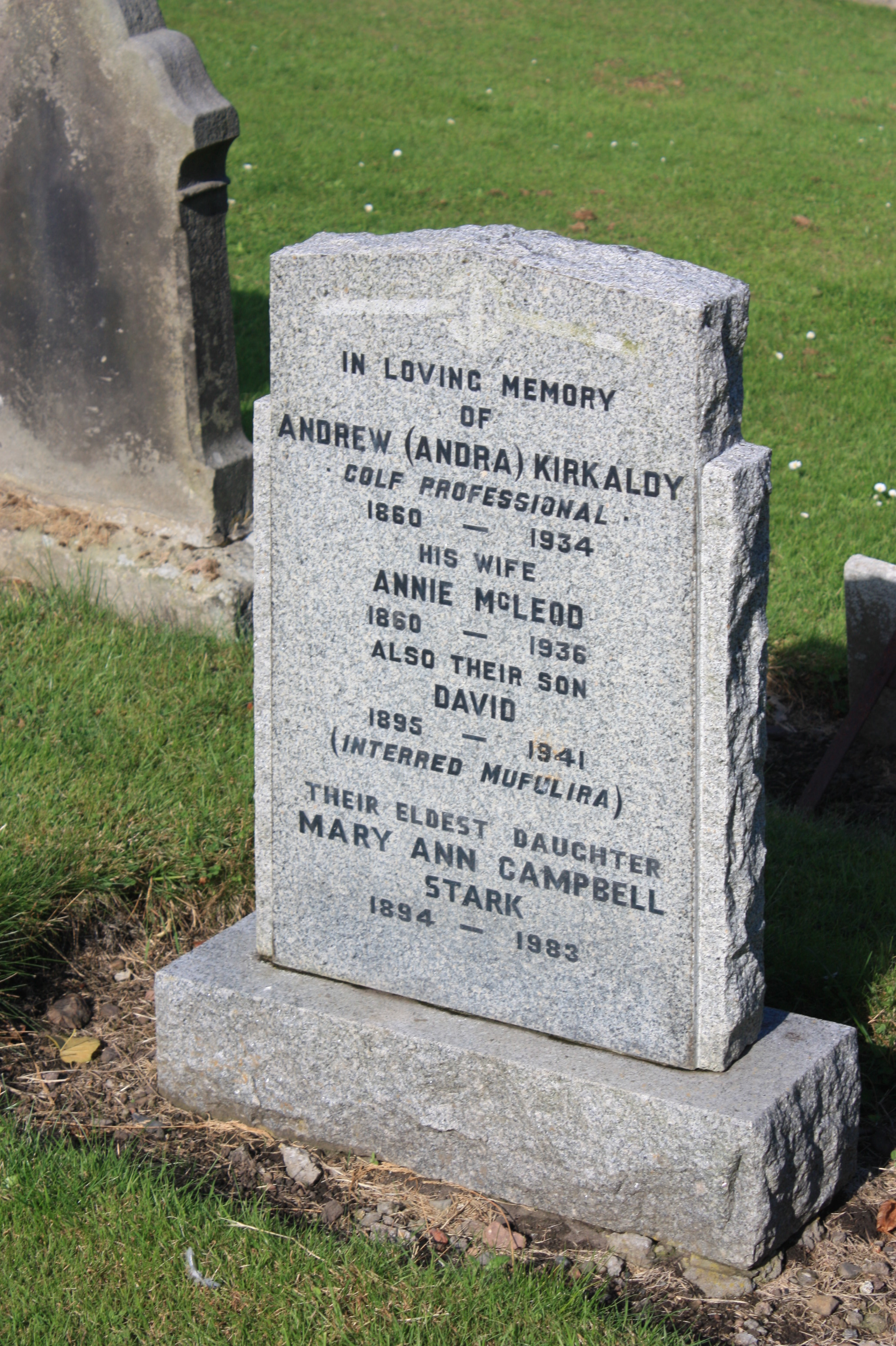
Grave of Andrew Kirkaldy at the Eastern Cemetery, St. Andrews

Andrew Kirkaldy (18 March 1860 – 16 April 1934) was a Scottish professional golfer who played during the late 19th and early 20th centuries. He was a frequent competitor in the Open Championship, finishing in the top-10 on 14 occasions. His best finish came in 1889 when he was second. He tied for first place in the event but lost a playoff to Willie Park Jr.

== Early life ==
Kirkaldy was born 18 March 1860 in Scotland. He was married to Annie McLeod.

== Golf career ==
In his first Open Championship in 1879, Kirkaldy finished second to Jamie Anderson at the Old Course at St Andrews. In the 1889 Open Championship at Musselburgh Links, he lost a playoff to Willie Park, Jnr. In the 1891 Open Championship his brother Hugh beat him by two shots and he finished second alongside Willie Fernie. In all, he placed in the top-10 14 times and the top-3 six times at the Open.

== Death ==
He died on 16 April 1934 and is buried in the Eastern Cemetery in St Andrews, south of the cathedral, near the main south-west entrance. His wife Annie McLeod Kirkaldy lies with him.

== Results in major championships ==
Tournament	1879	1880	1881	1882	1883	1884	1885	1886	1887	1888	1889
The Open Championship	T2	7								T6	2

Tournament	1890	1891	1892	1893	1894	1895	1896	1897	1898	1899
The Open Championship	T4	T2	T13	T4	3	3	T14	T10	T21	3

Tournament	1900	1901	1902	1903	1904	1905	1906	1907	1908	1909	1910
The Open Championship	T10	T18	T10	T11	T7	T24		WD		WD	CUT

Note: Kirkaldy played only in The Open Championship.

Top 10
Did not play

WD = withdrew
CUT = missed the half-way cut
"T" indicates a tie for a place

== Team appearances ==
- England–Scotland Professional Match (representing Scotland): 1904 (tie), 1905 (tie), 1907, 1909, 1910
