= Hugh Kirkaldy =

Scottish professional golfer

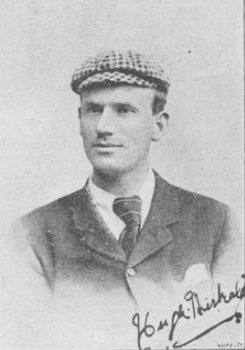
- Kirkaldy, c. 1895

Personal information
- Nationality: Scotland
- Born: 5 June 1868 St Andrews, Scotland
- Died: 4 April 1897 (aged 28) St Andrews, Scotland

Career
- Sport: Golf
- Turned professional: c. 1885

Best results in major championships (wins: 1)
- The Open Championship: Won: 1891

Hugh Kirkaldy (5 June 1868 – 4 April 1897) was a Scottish professional golfer who played in the late 19th century. He won the 1891 Open Championship.

== Early life ==
Kirkaldy was born on 5 June 1868 at St Andrews, Scotland. His brothers, Andrew and Jack, were also professional golfers.

== Golf career ==
=== 1891 Open Championship ===
He won the 1891 Open Championship, which was played over the Old Course at St Andrews. The tournament was played in October, in rough weather, and his winning score was 166 for 36 holes. He beat his brother Andrew and Willie Fernie of Troon by two shots. It was the last Open Championship contested over 36 holes.

== Death and legacy ==
On 4 April 1897, just six years after winning the 1891 Open Championship, he died of phthisis pulmonalis at the age of 28.

== Results in major championships ==
=== Wins (1) ===
Year	Championship	18 holes	Winning score	Margin	Runners-up
1891	The Open Championship	1 shot lead	83-83=166	2 strokes	(Scotland) Willie Fernie, (Scotland) Andrew Kirkaldy

=== Results timeline ===
Tournament	1885	1886	1887	1888	1889	1890	1891	1892	1893	1894	1895
The Open Championship	37		19	T11	T10	T7	1	T2	T4	T13	T15

Note: Kirkaldy only played in The Open Championship.

Win
Top 10
Did not play

"T" indicates a tie for a place
