= 1885 Open Championship =

Coordinates: 56.043°N 2.823°W

Tournament information
- Dates: 3 October 1885
- Location: St Andrews, Scotland
- Course: Old Course at St Andrews

Statistics
- Field: 60 players
- Prize fund: £35
- Winner's share: £10

Champion
- (Scotland) Bob Martin
- 171

Location in Scotland

The 1885 Open Championship was the 25th Open Championship, held 3 October at the Old Course at St Andrews, Fife, Scotland. Bob Martin won the Championship for the second time, by a stroke from Archie Simpson.

Simpson was one of the early starters. The first six holes took him 32 strokes but he reached the turn in 43 and coming home in 40 had an excellent round of 83. Martin started well and reached the turn in 41, eventually finishing with an 84. These turned out to be the leading scores of the morning play.

In the second round, Simpson again started badly, taking 38 for the first seven holes. He eventually finished with an 89 to a total of 172. Martin started his round better and, reaching the turn in 43, was now a stroke ahead of Simpson. Playing steadily he had 16 strokes for the last three holes to beat Martin. Taking five and six at the next two holes left him needing five at the last to take the lead. He put his third shot close at the last but missed the short putt and took five. David Ayton Sr. had a second round of 84 but was too far behind after the first round.

The Championship is best remembered for an event that never took place. Various sources refer to David Ayton losing the Open by taking 11 at the "Road hole" (the 17th) but a contemporary newspaper report gives his scores there as 6 and 7. His full cards are given as: Round 1: 555565734 = 45, 544764464 = 44, Total 89, Round 2: 554565533 = 41, 435565474 = 43, Total =84.

== Field ==
Amateurs: David Baldie, Leslie Balfour, John Ball, Robert Tod Boothby, W. Burn, Harry Everard, Samuel Mure Fergusson, Bruce Goff, W.H. Goff, T.S. Hendry, James Hunter, Horace Hutchinson, James Kirk, Johnny Laidlay, Arthur Molesworth, L. Ross

Professionals: Jamie Allan, David Anderson Sr., David Anderson Jr., Willie Anderson Sr., David Auchterlonie, Joseph Auchterlonie, Tom Auchterlonie, David Ayton Sr., Willie Brown, Jack Burns, Ben Campbell, Willie Campbell, C. Conacher, David Corstorphine, William Cosgrove, Willie Dunn, George Fernie, J. Fernie, Willie Fernie, Thomas Gourlay, David Grant Sr., William Greig, Sandy Herd, J. Kinsman, Robert Kinsman, Hugh Kirkaldy, Jack Kirkaldy, Bob Martin, George Mason, Douglas McEwan, Jack Morris, James Morris, Tom Morris Sr., Frank Park, Mungo Park, Willie Park Jr., James Paxton, Peter Paxton, James Rennie, Ben Sayers, George Sayers, Archie Simpson, David Simpson, Jack Simpson, Robert Simpson

== Final leaderboard ==
Saturday, 3 October 1885

Place	Player	Score	Money
1	(Scotland) Bob Martin	84-87=171	£10
2	(Scotland) Archie Simpson	83-89=172	£7
3	(Scotland) David Ayton Sr.	89-84=173	£5 10s
T4	(Scotland) Willie Fernie	89-85=174	£3 3s 4d
T4	(Scotland) Willie Park Jr.	86-88=174	£3 3s 4d
T4	(Scotland) Robert Simpson	85-89=174	£3 3s 4d
7	(Scotland) Jack Burns	88-87=175	£1 10s
8	(Scotland) Peter Paxton	85-91=176	£1
T9	(Scotland) Willie Campbell	86-91=177	5s
T9	(Scotland) James Morris	91-86=177	5s
