= David Anderson =

David Anderson may refer to:

== People ==
=== In academia or science ===
- David Anderson (academic) (born 1952), American college professor
- David Anderson (engineer) (1880–1953), Scottish civil engineer and lawyer
- David Anderson, 2nd Viscount Waverley (1911–1990), British peer and physician
- David F. Anderson (born 1978), professor at University of Wisconsin-Madison
- David G. Anderson (born 1949), American archaeologist
- David J. Anderson (born 1956), American neuroscientist
- David M. Anderson, American historian
- David P. Anderson (born 1955), scientist at University of California, Berkeley, director of SETI@home and BOINC
- David Stirling Anderson (1895–1981), Scottish engineer and educationalist
- David J. Anderson, engineer who developed the Kanban method

=== In arts, entertainment or media ===
- David Anderson (animator) (1952–2015), director of animated films
- David LeRoy Anderson, American make-up artist
- David Onri Anderson (born 1993), American painter, musician and curator
- David Anderson (artist) (?–1847), Scottish painter
- David Anderson (media executive) (born 1970/1971), managing director of the Australian Broadcasting Corporation
- David Anderson (Mass Effect), fictional character from Mass Effect: Revelation by Drew Karpyshyn

=== In business ===
- David Munro Anderson (born 1937), British businessman
- David W. Anderson, entrepreneur and founder of Famous Dave's restaurants and former head of the U.S. Bureau of Indian Education

=== In politics, government, or military ===
- David Anderson (Australian politician) (1865–1936), New South Wales politician
- David Anderson (British Army officer) (1821–1909), general and governor of Sandhurst
- David Anderson (British Columbia politician) (born 1937), Canadian Liberal politician and former cabinet member
- David Anderson (British politician) (born 1953), British Labour politician
- David Anderson (judge) (1916–1995), Scottish advocate and politician
- David Anderson (Manx politician) (born 1954), minister and member of the House of Keys
- David Anderson (Connecticut politician) (1925–2023), member of the Connecticut House of Representatives
- David Anderson (Saskatchewan politician) (born 1957), Canadian Conservative politician
- David Anderson (South Dakota politician) (born 1956), member of the South Dakota House of Representatives
- David Anderson, Baron Anderson of Ipswich (born 1961), British barrister
- David Anderson, Lord St Vigeans (1862–1948), Scottish lawyer and judge, chairman of the Scottish Land Court 1918–34
- David L. Anderson (attorney), United States attorney for the Northern District of California
- Murray Anderson (Royal Navy officer) (David Murray Anderson, 1874–1936), governor of Newfoundland and New South Wales
- David V. Anderson (1899–1979), Vermont politician

=== In religion ===
- David Anderson (American bishop) (born 1944), American Anglican bishop
- David Anderson (bishop of Rupert's Land) (1814–1885), English-born Canadian Anglican bishop
- David Lawrence Anderson (1850–1911), Episcopal minister and missionary to China

=== In sports ===
- David Anderson (American football) (born 1983), American football wide receiver
- Dave Anderson (boxer) (David Anderson, born 1965), British Olympic boxer
- David Anderson (cricketer) (1940–2005), Australian cricketer
- David Anderson (high jumper) (born 1965), Australian former high jumper
- David Anderson (ice hockey) (born 1962), Canadian former professional ice hockey player
- Dave Anderson (rower) (David Rollo Anderson, 1932–2025), Australian Olympic rower
- David Anderson Jr. (1867–1919), Scottish golfer
- David Anderson Sr. (1847–1912), Scottish golfer
- David Anderson (rugby league) (born 1969), Australian rugby league player

=== Other ===
- Billy Wilson (outlaw) (David Lawrence Anderson, 1862–1918), American outlaw
- David Nathaniel Anderson (born c. 1972), one of the assailants of the 2019 Jersey City shooting

== See also ==
- Dave Anderson (disambiguation)
- David Andersson (disambiguation)
- David Andersen (born 1980), Australian basketball player
- David Andersen (goldsmith) (1843–1901), Norwegian goldsmith
