= 1887 Open Championship =

Scottish golf tournament

Coordinates: 55.502°N 4.619°W

Tournament information
- Dates: 16 September 1887
- Location: Prestwick, South Ayrshire, Scotland
- Course: Prestwick Golf Club

Statistics
- Field: 40 players
- Prize fund: £20
- Winner's share: £8

Champion
- (Scotland) Willie Park Jr.
- 161

Location in Scotland

The 1887 Open Championship was the 27th Open Championship, held 16 September at Prestwick Golf Club in Prestwick, South Ayrshire, Scotland. Willie Park Jr. won the Championship, a stroke ahead of Bob Martin.

The Open was played in almost incessant rain and a cross wind. Willie Campbell was the warm favourite amongst the local crowd and was followed by the majority of the spectators. Willie Park, Jr. and Willie Fernie were paired together in the preceding group.

Campbell made a good start reaching the turn in 35 and eventually finishing with a 77. This was enough for a four stroke lead over Bob Martin and Archie Simpson with David Brown and Willie Park Jr. a further shot behind. Ben Sayers took 83 and they were the only six players to score better than 85.

In the second round Campbell reached the turn in 39. Park had reached the same hole in 37 but was still three behind. Playing a few groups behind Martin reached the turn in 38 and was level with Park at that point. The other contenders had faded away. Reaching the 16th hole Campbell was still two ahead of Park. Park had an excellent three at the hole. Campbell tried to carry the fairway bunker but his ball landed in the thick grass at the top of it. "He made a desperate effort to force it onto the green, but it proved futile, and five strokes were lost in the bunker". He eventually took nine and his chances of winning were gone. Park finished with two fives for a total of 161. In the second round he didn't have a score worse than five and wasn't in a single bunker in either round. Campbell finished one better than Park on the final two holes but was still three behind on 164. Martin couldn't quite match Park's good finish and ended a stroke behind on 162.

The bunker at the 16th became known as “Willie Campbell’s Grave”.

== Final leaderboard ==
Friday, 16 September 1887

Place	Player	Score	Money
1	(Scotland) Willie Park Jr.	82-79=161	£8
2	(Scotland) Bob Martin	81-81=162	£5
3	(Scotland) Willie Campbell	77-87=164	£3
4	(Scotland) Johnny Laidlay (a)	86-80=166	−
T5	(Scotland) Ben Sayers	83-85=168	£1
T5	(Scotland) Archie Simpson	81-87=168	£1
T7	(Scotland) Willie Fernie	86-87=173	15s
T7	(Scotland) Davie Grant	89-84=173	15s
9	(Scotland) David Brown	82-92=174	10s
T10	(Scotland) Ben Campbell	88-87=175	
T10	(England) Horace Hutchinson (a)	87-88=175	
