= 1895 Open Championship =

Coordinates: 56.043°N 2.823°W

Tournament information
- Dates: 12–13 June 1895
- Location: St Andrews, Scotland
- Course: Old Course at St Andrews

Statistics
- Field: 73 players
- Cut: none
- Prize fund: £90
- Winner's share: £30

Champion
- (England) J.H. Taylor
- 322

Location in Scotland

The 1895 Open Championship was the 35th Open Championship, held 12–13 June at the Old Course at St Andrews, Fife, Scotland. Defending champion J.H. Taylor won the Championship for the second time, by four strokes from runner-up Sandy Herd.

Harry Vardon, one of the early starters, led after the first round with an 80 but had an 85 in the afternoon to finish the day on 165. Herd had the best round of the afternoon with a 77 and led overnight on 159, five strokes clear of Taylor and Andrew Kirkaldy on 164.

Herd played steadily in the third round and finished with 82 to lead on 241. Taylor, playing in the last group, scored 80 to finish on 244. The Championship resolved into a battle between Herd and Taylor. Herd started well but took seven at the 5th. Playing in wind and rain, Herd eventually scored 85 to finish on 326. Taylor need an 81 to win and after 12 holes had only taken 49 strokes. Despite taking six at the next two holes he reached the 17th tee needing to take 12 or less to win. Playing carefully he scored five at the dangerous 17th and then four at the last to win by four strokes and retain the title. His 78 was the best round of the afternoon by four shots, the next best being an 82 by Ben Sayers.

== First day leaderboard ==
Wednesday, 12 June 1895

Place	Player	Score
1	(Scotland) Sandy Herd	82-77=159
T2	(Scotland) Andrew Kirkaldy	81-83=164
T2	(England) J.H. Taylor	86-78=164
T4	(Scotland) Willie Fernie	86-79=165
T4	(England) George Pulford	84-81=165
T4	(Jersey) Harry Vardon	80-85=165
T4	(Jersey) Tom Vardon	82-83=165
8	(Scotland) James Kinnell	84-83=167
9	(Scotland) Laurie Auchterlonie (a)	84-84=168
T10	(Scotland) David Anderson Jr.	86-83=169
T10	(England) Alfred Toogood	85-84=169
T10	(Scotland) Laurie Waters	86-83=169

== Final leaderboard ==
Thursday, 13 June 1895

Place	Player	Score	Money
1	(England) J.H. Taylor	86-78-80-78=322	£30
2	(Scotland) Sandy Herd	82-77-82-85=326	£20
3	(Scotland) Andrew Kirkaldy	81-83-84-84=332	£10
4	(England) George Pulford	84-81-83-86=334	£7
5	(Scotland) Archie Simpson	88-85-78-85=336	£5
T6	(Scotland) David Anderson Jr.	86-83-84-84=337	£3 6s 8d
T6	(Scotland) David Brown	81-89-83-84=337	£3 6s 8d
T6	(Scotland) Willie Fernie	86-79-86-86=337	£3 6s 8d
T9	(Scotland) Ben Sayers	84-87-85-82=338	£2
T9	(England) Alfred Toogood	85-84-83-86=338	£2
T9	(Jersey) Harry Vardon	80-85-85-88=338	£2
T9	(Jersey) Tom Vardon	82-83-84-89=338	£2
