= Robert Simpson (golfer) =

Scottish golfer, golf course architect, and club maker

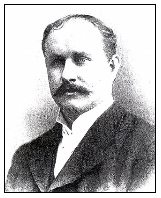
- Simpson, c. 1900

Personal information
- Nationality: Scotland
- Born: 20 February 1862 Elie, Scotland
- Died: 1 May 1923 (aged 61) Carnoustie, Scotland

Career
- Sport: Golf
- Status: Professional

Best results in major championships
- Masters Tournament: DNP
- PGA Championship: DNP
- U.S. Open: DNP
- The Open Championship: T4: 1885

Robert Simpson (20 February 1862 – 1 May 1923) was a Scottish professional golfer, golf course architect, and club maker who played in the early 20th century. The Simpsons Golf Shop, at Carnoustie Golf Links in Scotland, was founded in 1883 and remains the second oldest golf shop in the world. He is widely regarded as one of the greatest club makers of all time.

== Early life ==
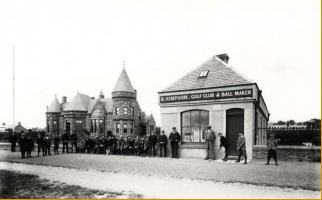
Simpson golf shop, c. 1890

Simpson was born in Elie, Scotland, in 1862. A club maker by trade, he apprenticed at age 16 in Elie under the direction of George Forrester whose club making business was located near the golf course in Elie. Simpson later worked under master club maker Robert Forgan in St. Andrews. He held the post of head professional at Carnoustie from 1891 to 1898.

He had five brothers who were all accomplished golfers: Jack, who won the 1884 Open Championship; and Archie, who emigrated to the United States, who was a goler with eight top-10 finishes in the Open Championship. Simpson, was a famous club-maker at Carnoustie, and never left Scotland.

== Golf career ==
=== Golf course architecture ===
Simpson was the co-designer, along with his brother Archie, of the Royal Aberdeen Golf Club course. He also assisted Old Tom Morris in a re-design of the links at Carnoustie.

== Death and legacy ==
Simpson died in 1923 in Carnoustie, Scotland. He was renowned for his fine hand-made "bulger" woods.

== Personal life ==
Simpson was elected to Carnoustie Town Council in 1909, serving in a variety of positions until his death.
