= 1883 Open Championship =

Coordinates: 55.948°N 3.044°W

Tournament information
- Dates: 16−17 November 1883
- Location: Musselburgh, East Lothian, Scotland
- Course: Musselburgh Links

Statistics
- Field: 34 players
- Prize fund: £20
- Winner's share: £8

Champion
- (Scotland) Willie Fernie
- 158, playoff

Location in Scotland

The 1883 Open Championship was the 23rd Open Championship, held 16 November at the Musselburgh Links, Musselburgh, East Lothian, Scotland. Willie Fernie and Bob Ferguson were tied on 158 each. They had a 36-hole playoff on 17 November, Fernie winning by a single stroke from Ferguson.

The weather was dull with light winds. Play did not begin until about 11:30 and with an early sunset the final groups played their last few holes in near darkness.

Fernie led at lunch with rounds of 38 and 37. His total of 75 was two ahead of Willie Park Jr. and three ahead of Ferguson, the defending champion who had had rounds of 38 and 40.

Fernie continued playing well although he took eight at the 3rd hole of his third round. Disaster came at the 2nd hole of the final round where he took 10. Despite this he had rounds of 40 and 43 and a total of 158. Park dropped out of contention in the afternoon and finished on 165. Interest now switched to Ferguson who was playing in the second to last group. His third round 42 seemed to put him out of the running but, playing in near darkness, he had a good last round of 38 to finish on 158 and tie with Fernie. Willie Brown was the best scorer in the afternoon with two rounds in the thirties but he finished on 160, two behind the leaders.

The playoff on the following day was close throughout. Light rain fell during the first and last rounds but, despite this, there was a large crowd to watch the play. Ferguson got off to the better start and was soon two strokes up. Ferguson dropped two strokes at the 8th but Fernie took four at the last to drop a shot behind again. In the second round Ferguson again dropped two strokes on the 8th to level the scores again and dropping another at the last was now behind for the first time.

When play resumed after lunch, the first three holes were halved before Ferguson levelled the match again at the short 4th. Fernie dropped another shot at the short 7th so Ferguson took the lead again. In the last round, Fernie again took the lead but by the time they reached the 8th tee the scores were level. Both players were on the green in two but Fernie three-putted and Ferguson took the lead to the last hole. Ferguson had the honour and hit his tee shot left of the hole while Fernie put his to four yards. Ferguson's first putt was short and then Fernie holed his putt for a two. "Quietness having been restored" Ferguson missed his putt and took four to give Fernie the Championship.

== Final leaderboard ==
Friday, 16 November 1883

Place	Player	Score	Money
T1	(Scotland) Bob Ferguson	38-40-42-38=158	Playoff
T1	(Scotland) Willie Fernie	38-37-40-43=158	Playoff
3	(Scotland) Willie Brown	40-43-39-38=160	£3
4	(Scotland) Bob Pringle	40-39-38-44=161	£2
T5	(Scotland) Willie Campbell	38-42-38-45=163	£1
T5	(Scotland) George Paxton	38-42-41-42=163	£1
7	(Scotland) Ben Sayers	42-39-40-43=164	
8	(Scotland) Willie Park Jr.	39-38-46-42=165	
9	(Scotland) Willie Dunn	43-42-40-41=166	
T10	(Scotland) Ben Campbell	40-41-44-42=167	
T10	(Scotland) Tom Morris Sr.	42-44-40-41=167	
T10	(Scotland) Peter Paxton	46-39-39-43=167	
T10	(Scotland) Douglas Rolland	45-37-41-44=167	

=== Playoff ===
Saturday, 17 November 1883

Place	Player	Score	Money
1	(Scotland) Willie Fernie	42-39-39-38=158	£8
2	(Scotland) Bob Ferguson	41-41-37-40=159	£5

=== Scorecards ===
Morning rounds

Hole	1	2	3	4	5	6	7	8	9	1st	1	2	3	4	5	6	7	8	9	2nd	Total
(Scotland) Fernie	5	5	6	4	5	6	4	3	4	42	5	5	5	4	5	5	4	3	3	39	81
(Scotland) Ferguson	4	5	6	3	5	6	4	5	3	41	5	5	5	4	5	5	3	5	4	41	82

Afternoon rounds

Hole	1	2	3	4	5	6	7	8	9	3rd	1	2	3	4	5	6	7	8	9	4th	Total
(Scotland) Fernie	4	6	4	4	5	5	4	4	3	39	5	5	4	3	5	6	3	5	2	38	77
(Scotland) Ferguson	4	6	4	3	5	5	3	4	3	37	5	5	5	4	4	6	3	4	4	40	77
