= 1894 Open Championship =

Coordinates: 56.043°N 2.823°W

Tournament information
- Dates: 11–12 June 1894
- Location: Sandwich, England
- Course: Royal St George's Golf Club

Statistics
- Field: 94 players
- Cut: none
- Prize fund: £90
- Winner's share: £30

Champion
- (England) J.H. Taylor
- 326

Location in England

The 1894 Open Championship was the 34th Open Championship, held 11–12 June at Royal St George's Golf Club in Sandwich, England. J.H. Taylor won the Championship by five strokes from runner-up Douglas Rolland. This was the first Open Championship held outside Scotland.

In a strong wind, many of the players struggled in their first round. Archie Simpson reached the turn in 39 but ended with a score of 90. The leader after the morning's play was Sandy Herd who was out in 41 and back in 42 for an 83. James Braid was back in 41 in the afternoon play but his score was ruined by a morning 91. Andrew Kirkaldy and Rolland had the afternoon's best scores of 79, but at the end of the day Taylor was the leader on 164 with Kirkaldy and Rolland on 165 and Ben Sayers on 166.

After the third round, Taylor had increased his lead to three strokes from Kirkaldy and to four over Rolland. Sayers, Herd and Alfred Toogood were the only others in contention. Kirkaldy had an excellent start in the last round reaching the turn in 36 but he had a seven at the 14th and eventually finished with an 84. Rolland had a steady 82, coming home in 42 strokes to lead Kirkaldy by a stroke. Taylor reached the turn in 37 and thus needed 48 more to beat Rolland. Despite a seven at the 13th he came back in 44 to finish with an 81, five ahead of Rolland. This was the first victory by a non-Scottish professional in the Open Championship.

== First day leaderboard ==
Monday, 11 June 1894

Place	Player	Score
1	(England) J.H. Taylor	84-80=164
T2	(Scotland) Andrew Kirkaldy	86-79=165
T2	(Scotland) Douglas Rolland	86-79=165
4	(Scotland) Ben Sayers	85-81=166
T5	(Scotland) Willie Fernie	84-84=168
T5	(Scotland) Sandy Herd	83-85=168
7	(England) Alfred Toogood	84-85=169
8	(Jersey) Harry Vardon	86-86=172
T9	(Scotland) Freddie Tait (a)	90-83=173
T9	(England) John Ball (a)	84-89=173

== Final leaderboard ==
Tuesday, 12 June 1894

Place	Player	Score	Money
1	(England) J.H. Taylor	84-80-81-81=326	£30
2	(Scotland) Douglas Rolland	86-79-84-82=331	£20
3	(Scotland) Andrew Kirkaldy	86-79-83-84=332	£10
4	(England) Alfred Toogood	84-85-82-82=333	£7
T5	(Scotland) Willie Fernie	84-84-86-80=334	£4
T5	(Scotland) Ben Sayers	85-81-84-84=334	£4
T5	(Jersey) Harry Vardon	86-86-82-80=334	£4
8	(Scotland) Sandy Herd	83-85-82-88=338	£3
9	(Scotland) Freddie Tait (a)	90-83-83-84=340	−
T10	(Scotland) Arnold Blyth (a)	91-84-84-82=341	−
T10	(Scotland) James Braid	91-84-82-84=341	£3
