= Willie Brown (golfer) =

Scottish golfer

Personal information
- Full name: William Brown
- Nationality: Scotland
- Born: c. 1858 Scotland

Career
- Sport: Golf
- Status: Professional

Best results in major championships
- Masters Tournament: DNP
- PGA Championship: DNP
- U.S. Open: DNP
- The Open Championship: 3rd: 1883

Willie Brown (born c. 1858) was a Scottish professional golfer who played in the late 19th century. Brown had three top-10 finishes in the Open Championship: he tied for 8th place in 1880, finished third in 1883, was in 23rd place in 1885, and was tied for seventh in 1889.

== Early life ==
Brown was born in Scotland circa 1858.

== Golf career ==
=== 1883 Open Championship ===
The 1883 Open Championship was the 23rd Open Championship, held 16 November at the Musselburgh Links, Musselburgh, East Lothian, Scotland. Brown scored well and finished in third place with rounds of 40-43-39-38=160 and took home £3 in prize money. Bob Ferguson won the tournament in a playoff over Willie Fernie.

=== 1889 Open Championship ===
The 1889 Open Championship was the 29th Open Championship, held 8 November at the Musselburgh Links, Musselburgh, East Lothian, Scotland. Brown tied for seventh place by carding rounds of 44-43-41-37=165, tying with Willie Campbell and Davie Grant. Each of the seventh place finishes won 13s 4d. Andrew Kirkaldy and Willie Park, Jr. were tied on 155 each after regulation play. They had a 36-hole playoff on 11 November, Park winning by five strokes from Kirkaldy. This was the sixth and last time the Open was played at Musselburgh. It was replaced by Muirfield as the venue for the 1892 Open Championship.

== Results in major championships ==
Tournament	1880	1881	1882	1883	1884	1885	1886	1887	1888	1889
The Open Championship	T8	DNP	DNP	3	DNP	23	DNP	DNP	DNP	T7

Note: Brown played only in The Open Championship.

DNP = Did not play
"T" indicates a tie for a place
Yellow background for top-10

== Death ==
Neither Brown's date of birth nor his date of death are known.
