= Thomas Grossett =

Scottish golfer

Personal information
- Nationality: Scotland
- Born: c. 1862 Scotland

Career
- Sport: Golf
- Status: Professional

Best results in major championships
- Masters Tournament: DNP
- PGA Championship: DNP
- U.S. Open: DNP
- The Open Championship: T4: 1886

Thomas Grossett was a Scottish professional golfer who competed in the late 19th century. He achieved a tie for fourth place in the 1886 Open Championship.

== Early life ==
Grossett was born in Scotland, circa 1862.

== 1886 Open Championship ==
The 1886 Open Championship took place on 5 November at the Musselburgh Links, Musselburgh, East Lothian, Scotland. David Brown emerged as the winner, securing a two-stroke victory over Willie Campbell.

=== Details of play ===
The tournament consisted of four rounds played on the 9-hole course. There were a total of 42 entries, including seven amateurs, with Horace Hutchinson and Johnny Laidlay being the prominent amateur players. The field was dominated by local Musselburgh professionals, accounting for 19 of the professional entries.

After the first round, David Brown and John Lambert both scored 38 to share the lead. Lambert and Willie Campbell led after the second round with a score of 78, while Brown trailed closely with 79 alongside Willie Fernie and Campbell. Brown had an impressive third round with a score of 37, taking a one-stroke lead over Campbell. However, both players struggled at the 3rd hole, with Brown taking 7 and Campbell taking 8. Campbell held the lead in the final round until he took 7 at the 5th hole, having been bunkered twice.

In the end, Brown finished two strokes ahead of Campbell, closing with two threes compared to Campbell's two fours. Willie Park, Jr. made a strong finish, but his chances were hindered by a score of 34 in the first six holes of his first round. Grossett capitalized on mistakes made by other golfers, posting rounds of 43-37-39-42=161 to secure a high position on the final leaderboard. He received a share of the prize fund amounting to £1.

== Results in The Open Championship ==
Tournament	1883	1884	1885	1886	1887
The Open Championship	14	DNP	DNP	T4	WD

Note: Grossett played only in The Open Championship.

WD = withdrew
"T" indicates a tie for a place
Yellow background for top-10
