= David Andersen (disambiguation) =

David Andersen (born 1980) is an Australian-Danish professional basketball player.

David Andersen may also refer to:

- David Andersen (cricketer) (1939–2024), New Zealand cricketer
- David Andersen (footballer) (1894–1964), Norwegian association footballer
- David Andersen (goldsmith) (1843–1901), Norwegian goldsmith

== See also ==
- Dave Anderson (disambiguation)
- David Andersson (disambiguation)
