= 1886 Open Championship =

Coordinates: 55.948°N 3.044°W

Tournament information
- Dates: 5 November 1886
- Location: Musselburgh, East Lothian, Scotland
- Course: Musselburgh Links

Statistics
- Field: 42 players
- Prize fund: £20
- Winner's share: £8

Champion
- (Scotland) David Brown
- 157

Location in Scotland

The 1886 Open Championship was the 26th Open Championship, held 5 November at the Musselburgh Links, Musselburgh, East Lothian, Scotland. David Brown won by two strokes from Willie Campbell.

The contest consisted of four rounds of the nine-hole course. There were 42 entries, including seven amateurs. Horace Hutchinson and Johnny Laidlay were the two leading amateurs playing. Local Musselburgh professionals dominated the field, providing 19 of the professional entries.

Brown and John Lambert led after the first round, both scoring 38. Lambert and Willie Campbell led after two rounds on 78, with Brown on 79 with Willie Fernie and Ben Campbell. Brown had an excellent 37 in the third round and took a one-stroke lead over Willie Campbell. They both fared badly at the 3rd hole, where Brown took 7 and Campbell took 8. Campbell was ahead in the final round until he took seven at the 5th, having been bunkered twice on the hole. Eventually Brown finished two ahead of Campbell, finishing with two threes to Campbell's two fours. Willie Park Jr. finished strongly, but his chances were ruined by taking 34 on the first six holes of his first round.

== Final leaderboard ==
Friday, 5 November 1886

Place	Player	Score	Money
1	(Scotland) David Brown	38-41-37-41=157	£8
2	(Scotland) Willie Campbell	39-39-39-42=159	£5
3	(Scotland) Ben Campbell	40-39-40-41=160	£3
T4	(Scotland) Bob Ferguson	41-41-39-40=161	£1
T4	(Scotland) Thomas Grossett	43-37-39-42=161	£1
T4	(Scotland) Willie Park Jr.	44-40-41-36=161	£1
T4	(Scotland) Archie Simpson	39-40-41-41=161	£1
T8	(Scotland) Willie Fernie	79-83=162	
T8	(Scotland) Davie Grant	86-76=162	
T8	(Scotland) Johnny Laidlay (a)	80-82=162	

Individual round scores are only known for the leading seven players.
