= David Anderson Sr. =

Scottish golfer

Personal information
- Nationality: Scotland
- Born: 1847 Scotland
- Died: 8 May 1912 (aged 65) St Andrews, Scotland

Career
- Sport: Golf
- Status: Professional

Best results in major championships
- Masters Tournament: DNP
- PGA Championship: DNP
- U.S. Open: DNP
- The Open Championship: T17: 1890

David Anderson Sr. (1847 – 8 May 1912) was a Scottish professional golfer who played in the late 19th century. His brother Jamie won The Open Championship three times (1877–79). His son David Jr. was also a professional golfer. Anderson's best result in the Open Championship was 17th place in 1890.

== Early life ==
Anderson was born in Scotland in 1847.

== Golf career ==
=== 1885 Open Championship ===
The 1885 Open Championship was held 3 October at the Old Course at St Andrews, Fife, Scotland. Bob Martin won the Championship for the second time, by a stroke from Archie Simpson. Anderson was in the field, however his result from this tournament has not been determined.

=== 1890 Open Championship ===
The 1890 Open Championship was held 11 September at Prestwick Golf Club in Prestwick, South Ayrshire, Scotland. John Ball won the Championship, three strokes ahead of Willie Fernie and Archie Simpson. Ball was both the first Englishman to win the Open and the first amateur to win it. Anderson finished tied for 17th place in this event.

== Death ==
Anderson died on 8 May 1912 in St Andrews, Scotland.
