= 1890 Open Championship =

Coordinates: 55.502°N 4.619°W

Tournament information
- Dates: 11 September 1890
- Location: Prestwick, South Ayrshire, Scotland
- Course: Prestwick Golf Club

Statistics
- Field: 39 players
- Prize fund: £30
- Winner's share: £13

Champion
- (England) John Ball (a)
- 164

Location in Scotland

The 1890 Open Championship was the 30th Open Championship, held 11 September at Prestwick Golf Club in Prestwick, South Ayrshire, Scotland. John Ball won the Championship, three strokes ahead of Willie Fernie and Archie Simpson. Ball was both the first Englishman to win the Open and the first amateur to win it.

Andrew Kirkaldy had the lead after the morning round with an 81. He was followed by his brother Hugh Kirkaldy and Ball on 82. These were the only players better than 85. Ball was playing with Willie Campbell who had a disappointing 86 to trail Ball by four strokes. Fernie was one of the early finishers in the afternoon and came back with a total of 167. Willie Park Jr. had an excellent 80 but was out of contention after a terrible start to his morning round.

Hugh Kirkaldy was playing with Simpson. While Kirkaldy faded after a 91, Simpson matched Fernie with his total of 167. Andrew Kirkaldy was in the next group but, like his brother, had a poor second round. Ball and Campbell were the next group, the last of the contenders. Initially Campbell matched Ball in the second round but after taking eight at the 9th he lost another shot to Ball at the 10th and, after topping his drive at the 11th, he tore up his card. Ball continued playing steadily and it became known that he needed 20 for the last four holes to win. Finishing 5-4-5-4 he won eventually by three strokes. He had completed each nine holes in exactly 41.

== Final leaderboard ==
Thursday, 11 September 1890

Place	Player	Score	Money
1	(England) John Ball (a)	82-82=164	−
T2	(Scotland) Willie Fernie	85-82=167	£9 10s
T2	(Scotland) Archie Simpson	83-84=167	£9 10s
T4	(Scotland) Andrew Kirkaldy	81-89=170	£2 10s
T4	(Scotland) Willie Park Jr.	90-80=170	£2 10s
6	(England) Horace Hutchinson (a)	87-85=172	−
T7	(Scotland) Davie Grant	86-87=173	£1 5s
T7	(Scotland) Hugh Kirkaldy	82-91=173	£1 5s
9	(Scotland) Willie McEwan	87-87=174	£1
10	(Scotland) David Brown	85-90=175	£1
