= George Fernie =

Scottish golfer

Personal information
- Nationality: Scotland
- Born: 18 October 1860 St Andrews, Fife, Scotland
- Died: 27 August 1915 (aged 54) Troon, Ayrshire, Scotland

Career
- Sport: Golf
- Turned professional: c. 1878

Best results in major championships
- Masters Tournament: DNP
- PGA Championship: DNP
- U.S. Open: DNP
- The Open Championship: T7: 1884

George Fernie (18 October 1860 – 27 August 1915) was a Scottish professional golfer who played in the late 19th century. Fernie had five starts in the Open Championship, the best of which was seventh place in the 1884 Open Championship.

== Early life ==
Fernie was born in St Andrews, Fife, Scotland on 18 October 1860.

== Golf career ==
=== 1884 Open Championship ===
The 1884 Open Championship was held 3 October at Prestwick Golf Club in Prestwick, South Ayrshire, Scotland. Jack Simpson won the Championship by four strokes, ahead of runners-up Willie Fernie and Douglas Rolland.

==== Details of play ====
This was the first Open Championship to be played at Prestwick after it had been extended from 12 to 18 holes in 1882. The contest was still over 36 holes but consisted of two 18-hole rounds rather than three 12-hole rounds. Conditions were difficult with a strong wind. Simpson, one of the early starters, had the best score in both rounds and was the surprise winner. Fernie and Rolland were joint second and shared the second and third prizes.

== Death ==
Fernie died on 27 August 1915 in Troon, Ayrshire, Scotland.

== Results in The Open Championship ==
Tournament	1884	1885	1886	1887	1888	1889	1890	1891
The Open Championship	T7	T18	DNP	T17	DNP	DNP	21	T39

Note: Fernie played only in The Open Championship.

DNP = Did not play
"T" indicates a tie for a place
Yellow background for top-10
