= 1884 Open Championship =

Coordinates: 55.502°N 4.619°W

Tournament information
- Dates: 3 October 1884
- Location: Prestwick, South Ayrshire, Scotland
- Course: Prestwick Golf Club

Statistics
- Field: 28 players
- Prize fund: £20
- Winner's share: £8

Champion
- (Scotland) Jack Simpson
- 160

Location in Scotland

The 1884 Open Championship was the 24th Open Championship, held 3 October at Prestwick Golf Club in Prestwick, South Ayrshire, Scotland. Jack Simpson won the Championship by four strokes, ahead of runners-up Willie Fernie and Douglas Rolland.

This was the first Open Championship to be played at Prestwick after it had been extended from 12 to 18 holes in 1882. The contest was still over 36 holes but consisted of two 18-hole rounds rather than three 12-hole rounds.

Conditions were difficult with a strong wind. Simpson, one of the early starters, had the best score in both rounds and was the surprise winner. Fernie and Rolland were joint second and shared the second and third prizes.

== Final leaderboard ==
Friday, 3 October 1884

Place	Player	Score	Money
1	(Scotland) Jack Simpson	78-82=160	£8
T2	(Scotland) Willie Fernie	80-84=164	£4
T2	(Scotland) Douglas Rolland	81-83=164	£4
T4	(Scotland) Willie Campbell	84-85=169	£1
T4	(Scotland) Willie Park Jr.	86-83=169	£1
6	(Scotland) Ben Sayers	83-87=170	£1
T7	(Scotland) Tom Dunn	171	10s
T7	(Scotland) George Fernie	171	10s
T9	(Scotland) Peter Fernie	172	
T9	(Scotland) Jack Kirkaldy	172	

Individual round scores are only known for the leading six players.
