= Willie McEwan (golfer) =

Scottish professional golfer

Personal information
- Full name: William McEwan
- Nationality: Scotland
- Born: 1872 Musselburgh, Scotland
- Died: 2 May 1931 (aged 58) Formby, Lancashire, England

Career
- Sport: Golf
- Status: Professional

Best results in major championships
- Masters Tournament: DNP
- PGA Championship: DNP
- U.S. Open: DNP
- The Open Championship: 9th: 1890

William McEwan (1872 – 2 May 1931) was a Scottish professional golfer. McEwan placed ninth in the 1890 Open Championship which was held 11 September at Prestwick Golf Club in Prestwick, South Ayrshire, Scotland. His share of the purse was £1.

== Early life ==
William McEwan was born in 1872, the son of Peter McEwan Sr.

== 1890 Open Championship ==
McEwan had rounds of 87-87=174 and finished in ninth place, winning £1 in prize money. John Ball won the Championship, three strokes ahead of Willie Fernie and Archie Simpson. Ball was both the first Englishman to win the Open and the first amateur to win it.

== Death ==
McEwan died on 2 May 1931, aged 58, while playing golf at Formby Golf Club at Formby, England, where he was the professional.
