= Ben Campbell =

Benjamin or Ben Campbell may refer to:

- Ben Nighthorse Campbell (1933–2025), American politician from Colorado
- Benjamin Campbell (1826–1907), founder of Campbell, California
- Benedict Campbell (born 1957), Canadian voice actor
- Ben Campbell, a character in the 2008 film 21
- Ben Campbell (Scottish golfer) (fl. 1861–1893), Scottish professional golfer
- Ben Campbell (Houston mayor) (1858–1942), American lawyer and politician
- Ben Campbell (musician), New Zealand musician, bassist for rock bands Atlas and Zed
- Ben Campbell (New Zealand golfer) (born 1991), New Zealand professional golfer
- Benjamin Campbell (consular agent) (c. 1802 – 1859), British merchant and consular agent
