= Murcar Links Golf Club =

Scottish golf club

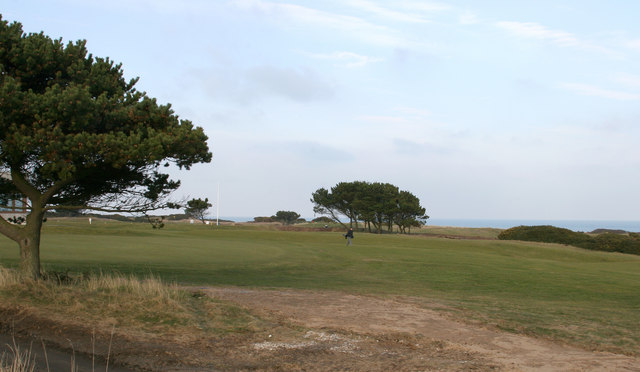
- Murcar Golf Course

- Location in Scotland
- 57°12′9″N 2°4′15″W

Club information
- Location: Aberdeen, Scotland
- Established: 1909
- Tota holes: 18
- Website: Official site
- Designed by: Archie Simpson and James Braid
- Par: 71
- Length: 6,516 yards (5,958 m)

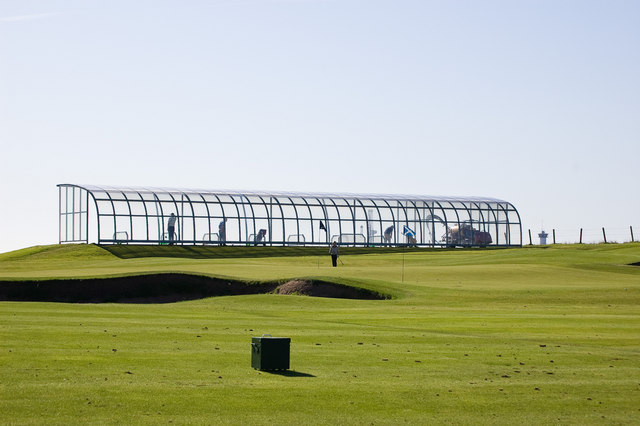
Driving Range at Murcar Golf Course

Murcar Links Golf Club is a golf club in northern Aberdeen, Scotland, to the north of the Royal Aberdeen Golf Club. The 18-hole, par 71, 6,516 yard course was established in 1909. The course was designed by Archie Simpson and later changed by and James Braid.

According to Golf Monthly, the club is on the Top 100 Golf Courses UK and Ireland. The Scottish Golf Union cites it as "one of the most celebrated courses in Scotland".

== History ==
The club was founded in 1909.

During World War 2, the area around the burn had anti-tank landmines planted in the Tarbothill Minefield. This was cleared in 1944 by the 11th Company Bomb disposal - Royal Engineers. During clearance, a Wasp (Bren Gun Carrier converted into a flame thrower) used to burn grass off the minefield detonated a mine. Several sappers were injured, one losing a hand. The Wasp was destroyed.

In 2006 the club hosted the European Challenge Tour’s inaugural Scottish Challenge, and in 2009 it hosted the European Girls' Team Championship and the Scottish Amateur Stroke Play Championship.

In April 2012 the club hosted the Paul Lawrie Foundation Scottish Boys Championship and in July 2013 it hosted the European Boys' Team Championship.

== Railway ==
From 1909 until 1949 the Club was served by a railway, which it owned from 1924. The Strathbathie Light Railway had been built to 3 ft gauge to serve the Seaton Brick & Tile Co's brickworks. From 1932 the railway was operated with a 40-seat Wickham railcar, powered by a 24 hp (18 kW) Ford petrol engine. The railway was originally about 4 km (2.5 mi) long.
