= 1888 Open Championship =

Coordinates: 56.043°N 2.823°W

Tournament information
- Dates: 6, 8 October 1888
- Location: St Andrews, Scotland
- Course: Old Course at St Andrews

Statistics
- Field: 52 players
- Prize fund: £20
- Winner's share: £8

Champion
- (Scotland) Jack Burns
- 171

Location in Scotland

The 1888 Open Championship was the 28th Open Championship, held 6 October at the Old Course at St Andrews, Fife, Scotland. Jack Burns won the Championship by a stroke from David Anderson Jr. and Ben Sayers.

Willie Campbell led after 18 holes for the third successive year and was the leader on 84 with Sayers on 85 and a group of four players on 86.

In the afternoon Sayers, in the first group, scored 87 and took an early lead on 172. Campbell made a number of mistakes and scored 90 for a total of 174. Sayers was then joined on 172 by David Anderson. Playing a few groups behind, Burns scored an 85 and took the lead on 171, a score none of the later players could match.

Burns's score for his first round had originally been added up to 87 but a Royal and Ancient Golf Club member noticed that it was added up incorrectly and the total was adjusted to 86, making Burns the champion.

== Final leaderboard ==
Saturday, 6 October 1888

| Place | Player | Score | Money |
|---|---|---|---|
| 1 | (Scotland) Jack Burns | 86-85=171 | £8 |
| T2 | (Scotland) David Anderson Jr. | 86-86=172 | Playoff |
| T2 | (Scotland) Ben Sayers | 85-87=172 | Playoff |
| 4 | (Scotland) Willie Campbell | 84-90=174 | £2 |
| 5 | (Scotland) Leslie Balfour (a) | 86-89=175 | − |
| T6 | (Scotland) Davie Grant | 88-88=176 | 10s |
| T6 | (Scotland) Andrew Kirkaldy | 87-89=176 | 10s |
| 8 | (Scotland) Sandy Herd | 93-84=177 | − |
| 9 | (Scotland) David Ayton Sr. | 87-91=178 | − |
| 10 | (Scotland) Johnny Laidlay (a) | 93-87=180 | − |

=== Playoff ===
Monday, 8 October 1888

Anderson and Sayers played an 18-hole play-off two days later. Sayers won and took the second prize of £6, Anderson taking the third prize of £3.
