= George Strath =

Scottish golfer and golf course designer

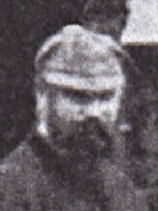
- George Strath, c. 1875

Personal information
- Nationality: Scotland
- Born: 1 October 1843 St Andrews, Scotland
- Died: 21 January 1919 (aged 75) New York City, New York
- Spouse: Christina Ronald
- Children: 1

Career
- Sport: Golf
- Status: Professional

Best results in major championships
- Masters Tournament: DNP
- PGA Championship: DNP
- U.S. Open: DNP
- The Open Championship: 14th: 1878

George Strath (1 October 1843 – 21 January 1919) was a Scottish professional golfer and golf course designer of the late 19th century and early 20th century. He was born in St Andrews, Fifeshire, Scotland. As a young lad he worked as a caddie, carrying the clubs of Old Tom Morris at St Andrews.

Strath placed 14th in the 1878 Open Championship at Prestwick. He served as the first professional at Royal Troon Golf Club in Scotland from 1881–87. In June 1883, Strath increased the links at Troon to twelve holes. A further six holes were completed by 1885. Strath's brother—Davie Strath—was also a fine golfer with seven top-10 finishes in the Open Championship. His other brother, Andrew Strath, won the 1865 Open Championship. George had three brothers, one of which was not a professional golfer.

== Early life ==
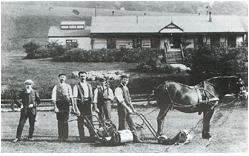
Green keepers and their equipment at Ilkley Golf Club. Tom Vardon stands far left, c. 1900.

Strath was born on 1 October 1843, the son of Alexander Strath and Susan Strath (née Reid). He married Christina Ronald on 31 December 1868 in St Andrews, Scotland. They had at least one child, a daughter named Susan. At the time of his marriage, Strath was working as a ship carpenter but would soon thereafter start a career in golf.

His first professional post was at the Glasgow Golf Club where he was well known for the great condition of his golf course, especially the wonderful putting surfaces. He moved to the north of England to become professional at Southport Old Links from 1888–92. He later served at North Manchester in 1894–95. Strath assisted in the design of Ilkley Golf Club (pictured left) which is the oldest club in West Riding and the third oldest in Yorkshire.

A 9-hole course was established on Rombald's Moor at the request of Ben Hirst and Alfred Potter in June 1890. The location for the original 9-hole course was planned with assistance from Strath, who after leaving Royal Troon was the club professional at Southport Old Links. After leaving Southport he then took a job as professional at Stinchcombe in Gloucestershire from 1893–94.

He was an excellent club maker, making beautiful long-nosed woods. When Strath left Troon in 1887, Willie Fernie took over as professional and served the club for 37 years. Fernie was also from a St Andrews family and won the Open Championship in 1883.

== Emigration to the U.S. ==
Strath and his wife Christina boarded the RMS Umbria and sailed from Liverpool, arriving in New York City on 28 September 1895. Prior to leaving Scotland, Christina had been ill and doctors recommended a change of climate for her recovery.

== Golf career ==
He began his U.S. golf career quickly by entering the 1896 U.S. Open at Shinnecock Hills Golf Club in Southampton, New York. He shot rounds of 91-89=180 and finished well back from the leaders. After his arrival in the United States, Strath never made it a priority to be a tournament golfer, but rather he preferred the business side of the game by being a greens keeper and instructor, having no superiors in either of those categories.

In late 1895 he laid out the links at Dyker Meadow Club in Brooklyn where George Low would later be posted. He left Dyker Meadow and took a post at Shelter Island in 1897. He later worked for a short time at Wee Burn Club in Darien, Connecticut, in 1901. While at Wee Burn he instructed such champions as Charles H. Seely, 3-time champion of Connecticut from 1901–3, and twice winner of the Metropolitan Amateur championship in 1905 and 1908. In 1909 Strath was appointed as president of the Eastern Professional Golf Association.

While still posted at Wee Burn, Strath was the golf instructor to Genevieve Hecker who was the U.S. Women's Amateur national champion in 1901 and 1902. After his stint at Wee Burn, he spent one year at the Hillandale Golf Club in Stamford, Connecticut. He left Hillandale to design the Crescent Athletic Club links in Brooklyn where his tenure was from 1901 through 1918.

== Death ==
Strath died—due to heart trouble—at the age of 76 in New York City on 21 January 1919.
