= David Ayton Sr. =

Scottish golfer (1857–1931)

David Ayton, Sr.
Personal information
- Nationality: Scotland
- Born: 25 May 1857 St Andrews, Scotland
- Died: 30 January 1931 (aged 73) St Andrews, Scotland

Career
- Sport: Golf
- Status: Professional

Best results in major championships
- Masters Tournament: DNP
- PGA Championship: DNP
- U.S. Open: DNP
- The Open Championship: 3rd: 1885

David Ayton Sr. (25 May 1857 – 30 January 1931) was a Scottish professional golfer who played in the late 19th century. He had three top-10 finishes in the Open Championship. He was the son of William Ayton, one of the eleven founders of St Andrews Golf Club in about 1843.

== Early life ==
Ayton was born on 25 May 1857 in St Andrews, Scotland, to William Ayton, one of the eleven founders of St Andrews Golf Club circa 1843.

== Golf career ==
He was at the peak of his playing form in the 1880s with his best performance, a third place, in the 1885 Open Championship held at the Old Course, St Andrews, Scotland, finishing two strokes behind the winner Bob Martin. He is best remembered for an event that never took place. Various sources (including his obituary in the Dundee Courier) refer to him taking 11 at the "Road hole" (the 17th) but a contemporary newspaper report gives his scores there as 6 and 7. He also had top-10 finishes in the 1882 and 1888 Open Championships.

== Family ==
His sons David Jr., Laurie Sr., George and Alex were all professional golfers, as was his grandson Laurie Jr.

== Death and legacy ==
Ayton died in St Andrews, Scotland, on 30 January 1931. He is best remembered for a fine third-place finish in the 1885 Open Championship and for reputedly taking an 11 on the Road hole (#17) on the Old Course which, in fact, never happened.

== Results in The Open Championship ==
Tournament	1873	1874	1875	1876	1877	1878	1879	1880	1881	1882	1883	1884	1885	1886	1887	1888	1889	1890	1891	1892	1893	1894	1895
The Open Championship	T17			?			T11			T7			3		T12	9		T17	T24				WD

Note: Ayton played only in The Open Championship.

Top 10
Did not play

WD = Withdrew
? = Competed, finish unknown
"T" indicates a tie for a place
