= Arnold Blyth =

Scottish golfer

Personal information
- Full name: Arnold Davison Blyth
- Nationality: Scotland
- Born: 22 November 1856 Edinburgh, Midlothian, Scotland
- Died: 14 March 1917 (aged 60) St George Hanover Square, City of Westminster, Greater London, UK

Career
- Sport: Golf
- Status: Amateur

Best results in major championships
- Masters Tournament: DNP
- PGA Championship: DNP
- U.S. Open: DNP
- The Open Championship: T10: 1894

Arnold Davison Blyth (22 November 1856 – 14 March 1917) was a Scottish amateur golfer. Blyth tied for tenth place along with James Braid in the 1894 Open Championship.

== Early life ==
Blyth was born in Scotland in 1856.

== Golf career ==
Blyth tied for tenth place along with James Braid in the 1894 Open Championship.

=== 1894 Open Championship ===
The 1894 Open Championship was the 34th Open Championship, held 11–12 June at Royal St George's Golf Club in Sandwich, England. J.H. Taylor won the Championship by five strokes from runner-up Douglas Rolland. This was the first Open Championship held outside Scotland.

==== Details of play ====
The players had to battle heavy winds in the first round and the scoring suffered as a result. Blyth—along with most of the field—was victimized by the swirling winds, firing a disappointing 91. However, he regained his composure and scored significantly better in the final three rounds. His round-by-round results were as follows: 91-84-84-82=341.

== Team appearances ==
- England–Scotland Amateur Match (representing Scotland): 1904 (winners)
