= Ben Campbell (Scottish golfer) =

Scottish golfer

Personal information
- Nationality: Scotland
- Born: c. 1861 Scotland

Career
- Sport: Golf
- Status: Professional

Best results in major championships
- Masters Tournament: DNP
- PGA Championship: DNP
- U.S. Open: DNP
- The Open Championship: 3rd: 1886

Ben Campbell (born c. 1861) was a Scottish professional golfer who played in the late 19th century. Campbell had three top-10 finishes in The Open Championship. In the 1886 Open Championship he played fine golf, finishing alone in third place. The next year, in the 1887 Open Championship, he tied for tenth place.

== Early life ==
Campbell was born c. 1861 in Scotland.

== Golf career ==
=== 1886 Open Championship ===
The 1886 Open Championship was held 5 November at the Musselburgh Links, Musselburgh, East Lothian, Scotland. David Brown won by two strokes from Willie Campbell.

==== Details of play ====
The contest consisted of four rounds over the 9-hole course. There were 42 entries including seven amateurs. Horace Hutchinson and Johnny Laidlay were the two leading amateurs playing. Local Musselburgh professionals dominated the field, providing 19 of the professional entries.

Brown and John Lambert led after the first round, both scoring 38. Lambert and Willie Campbell led after two rounds on 78 with Brown on 79 with Willie Fernie and Campbell. Brown had an excellent 37 in the third round and took a one stroke lead over Willie Campbell. They both fared badly at the 3rd hole where Brown took 7 and Campbell took 8. Campbell was ahead in the final round until he took seven at the 5th, having been bunkered twice on the hole. Eventually Brown finished two ahead of Campbell, finishing with two threes to Campbell's two fours. Willie Park, Jr. finished strongly but his chances were ruined by taking 34 on the first six holes of his first round.

== Death ==
Campbell's date of birth and date of death are unknown.

== Results in The Open Championship ==
Tournament	1883	1884	1885	1886	1887	1888	1889	1890	1891	1892	1893	1894	1895	1896	1897	1898	1899	1900	1901	1902	1903
The Open Championship	T10	DNP	T22	3	T10	DNP	?	T15	?	T16	CUT	DNP	DNP	DNP	DNP	DNP	DNP	DNP	DNP	DNP	CUT

Note: Campbell played only in The Open Championship.

DNP = Did not play
CUT = missed the half-way cut
? = competed, finish unknown
"T" indicates a tie for a place
Yellow background for top-10
