= Laurie Ayton Snr =

Scottish professional golfer (1884–1962)

Laurie Ayton Snr (1884 – 27 October 1962) was a Scottish golfer.

== Early life ==
Ayton was a descendant of William Ayton, one of the eleven founders of St Andrews Golf Club in about 1843. He was the son of David Ayton, Sr.

== Professional career ==
Ayton served as the club captain in 1953. He finished in the top-10 in eight majors with his best finish being 4th at the 1910 Open Championship.

== Personal life ==
His son, Laurie Ayton Jnr, was on the 1949 Ryder Cup team.

== Results in major championships ==
Tournament	1910	1911	1912	1913	1914	1915	1916	1917	1918	1919
U.S. Open								NT	NT	
The Open Championship	4	9	5	T30	WD	NT	NT	NT	NT	NT
PGA Championship	NYF	NYF	NYF	NYF	NYF	NYF		NT	NT	

Tournament	1920	1921	1922	1923	1924	1925	1926	1927	1928	1929
U.S. Open	T17	T18	T11		T25	T9	T16	T38		
The Open Championship										
PGA Championship	R16	R16	R64			R32	R32			

Tournament	1930	1931	1932	1933	1934	1935	1936	1937	1938	1939
U.S. Open		T23	WD							
The Open Championship				21		10				T30
PGA Championship	R16									

Note: Ayton never played in the Masters Tournament.

Top 10
Did not play

NYF = tournament not yet founded
NT = no tournament
WD = withdrew
CUT = missed the half-way cut
R64, R32, R16, QF, SF = round in which player lost in PGA Championship match play
"T" indicates a tie for a place

== Team appearances ==
- England–Scotland Professional Match (representing Scotland): 1910, 1912 (tie), 1913, 1933, 1934
