= Peter Fernie =

Scottish golfer

Personal information
- Full name: Peter Gray Fernie
- Nationality: Scotland
- Born: 16 January 1862 St Andrews, Scotland
- Died: 9 August 1942 (aged 80) St Andrews, Scotland

Career
- Sport: Golf
- Status: Professional

Best results in major championships
- Masters Tournament: DNP
- PGA Championship: DNP
- U.S. Open: DNP
- The Open Championship: T9: 1884

Peter Gray Fernie (16 January 1862 – 9 August 1942) was a Scottish professional golfer and clubmaker.

== Early life ==
Fernie was born in St Andrews, Scotland, in 1862. He had a brother, William, who was also a professional golfer.

== Golf career ==
Fernie trained as a professional in St Andrews under Old Tom Morris. He moved to England, and worked as the professional at the London Scottish Club on Wimbledon Common until 1900, when he went to Ipswich. In 1915, he was involved in a case contesting a patent for golf ball dimples that had been granted; largely based on the evidence Fernie gave, that he had created a ball with indentations in 1897, the patent was revoked.

As a player, Fernie competed in many exhibition matches against leading players, and a few professional tournaments. He played in The Open Championship on six occasions, and had one top‑10 finish, in 1884 at Prestwick, when he tied for ninth place with Jack Kirkaldy.

== Death ==
On retiring, Fernie moved back to St Andrews, where he died on 9 August 1942.

== Results in The Open Championship ==
Tournament	1882	1883	1884	1885	1886	1887	1888	1889	1890	1891	1892	1893	1894	1895	1896
The Open Championship	T21	DNP	T9	DNP	22	24	DNP	DNP	DNP	DNP	DNP	DNP	WD	DNP	T33

Note: Fernie played only in The Open Championship.

DNP = Did not play
WD = Withdrew
"T" indicates a tie for a place
Yellow background for top-10
