= William J. Devine Memorial Golf Course =

Public golf course in Boston, Massachusetts

- Location in Massachusetts
- 42°18′03″N 71°05′19″W

Club information
- Location: Boston, Massachusetts, United States
- Established: 1896, 130 years ago
- Type: Public
- Owner: City of Boston
- Operator: City of Boston Parks and Recreation Department
- Total holes: 18
- Tournaments: MGA 2018 Massachusetts Amateur
- Website: cityofbostongolf.com
- Designed by: Willie Campbell, Donald Ross
- Par: 70
- Length: 6,013 yards (5,498 m)
- Course rating: 69.5
- Slope rating: 126

William J. Devine Memorial Golf Course, colloquially referred to as and contained within Franklin Park, is a municipal golf course in the Jamaica Plain neighborhood of Boston, Massachusetts, bordered by the neighborhoods of Dorchester and Roxbury. Established on October 26, 1896, it is the second oldest public golf course in the United States. The course is named after William J. Devine, former Commissioner of Boston's Parks and Recreation Department.

== History ==
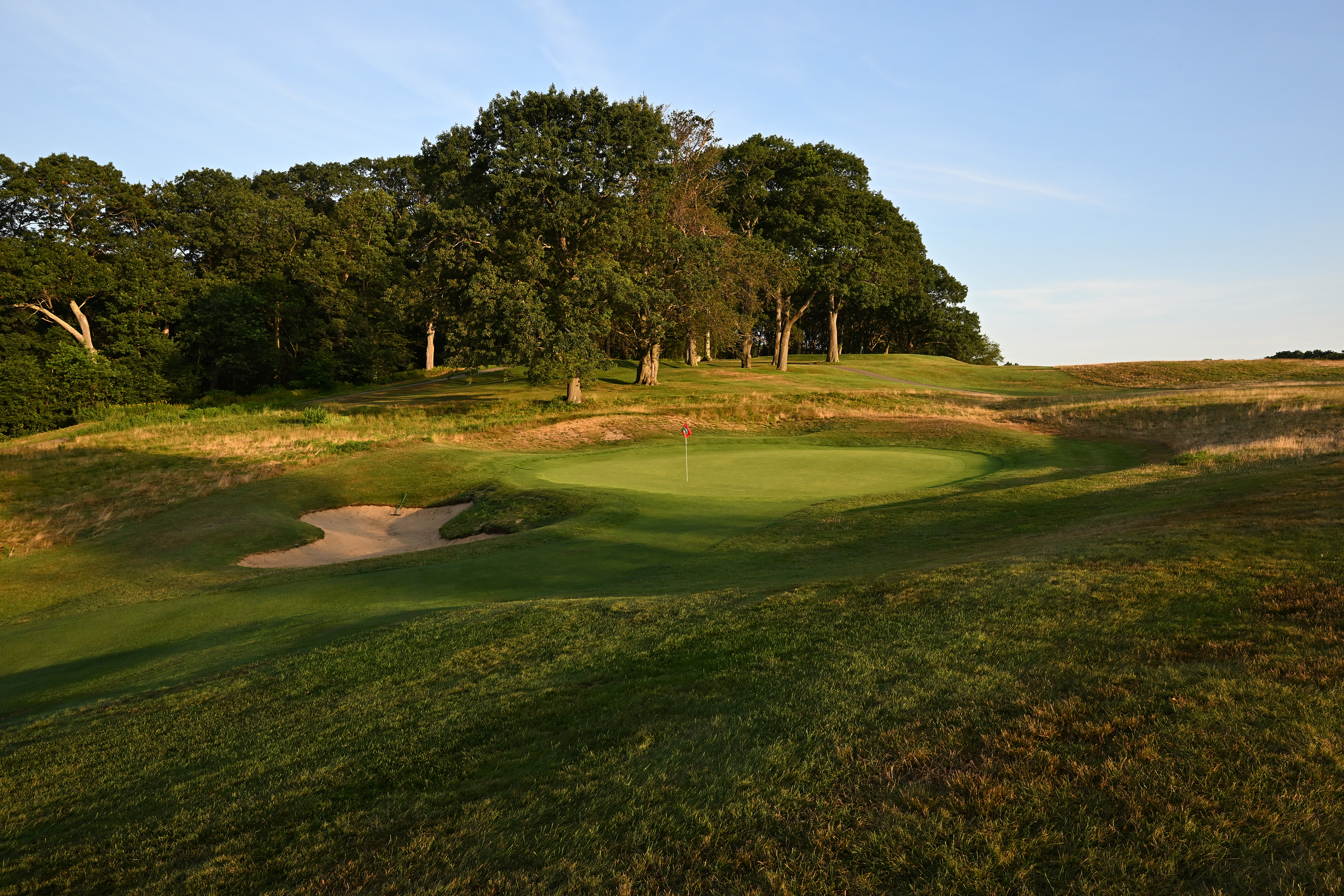
View of the 17th green

In 1890 George Wright, the former star shortstop of the Cincinnati Red Stockings and the Boston Red Stockings, set in motion the origin of the first public golf course in New England.

Wright and partner Henry Ditson were the proprietors of sporting goods store Wright & Ditson on Washington Street in Boston. When ordering cricket equipment from an English athletic goods catalog, Wright noticed a listing for golf balls and clubs. Despite not having knowledge of the game, Wright placed an order for a dozen golf balls and a set of clubs.

After acquiring a rulebook he attempted to play a game in Franklin Park in October 1890, but was stopped by a policeman who informed him he needed approval to play from the Boston Parks Department. Wright wrote a letter to the commission but was denied authorization, the stated concern that it was too dangerous for people walking in the park. Undeterred, Wright personally attended the next commissioners' meeting on December 5 and received a hearing, and a permit was granted on an "experimental" basis.

On December 10, Wright and an assistant paced off the holes, tomato cans buried in the ground serving as cups. Flagsticks were cut 3 feet in length with a piece of red flannel attached to serve as flags marking each hole. Wright, Fred Mansfield, Sam Macdonald and Temple Craig then played the new course, becoming the first foursome to play on American public, municipally owned land. They played 2 rounds of 10 holes.

FIRST ROUND
| Hole | 1 | 2 | 3 | 4 | 5 | 6 | 7 | 8 | 9 | 10 | Total |
| Wright | 8 | 7 | 8 | 6 | 9 | 7 | 6 | 5 | 4 | 8 | 68 |
| Macdonald | 11 | 7 | 3 | 8 | 4 | 5 | 11 | 7 | 8 | 8 | 72 |
| Mansfield | 14 | 8 | 7 | 9 | 6 | 6 | 5 | 5 | 6 | 8 | 74 |
| Craig | 7 | 6 | 6 | 7 | 7 | 5 | 7 | 9 | 11 | 10 | 75 |
SECOND ROUND
| Hole | 1 | 2 | 3 | 4 | 5 | 6 | 7 | 8 | 9 | 10 | Total |
| Wright | 6 | 6 | 4 | 5 | 3 | 4 | 10 | 9 | 6 | 6 | 59 |
| Mansfield | 7 | 4 | 5 | 5 | 7 | 7 | 6 | 6 | 6 | 6 | 59 |
| Macdonald | 6 | 4 | 5 | 8 | 9 | 6 | 5 | 5 | 4 | 8 | 60 |
| Craig | 6 | 9 | 7 | 6 | 6 | 6 | 6 | 9 | 4 | 6 | 65 |

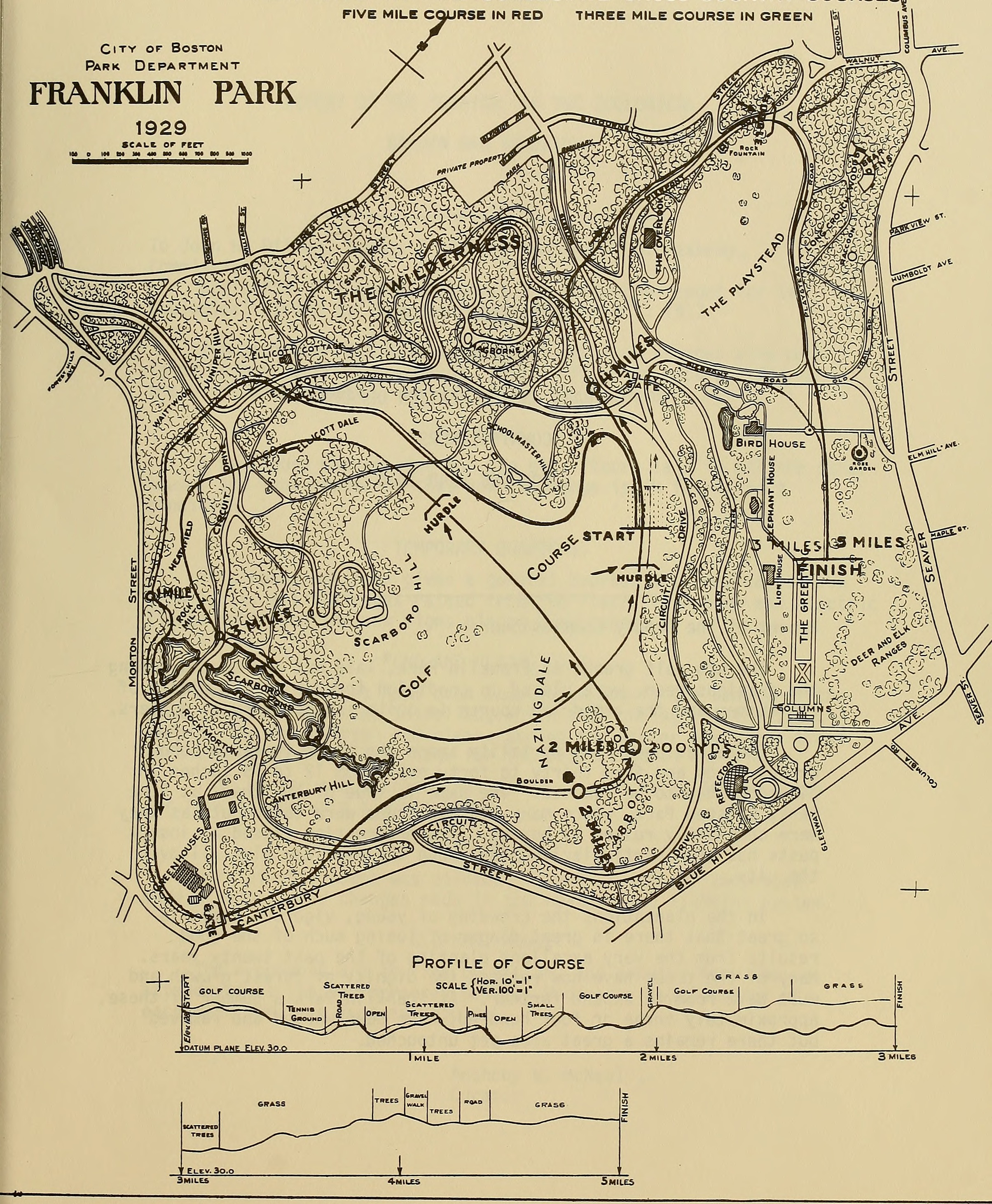
Franklin Park, 1929

After the day's events, Wright reported all had "enjoyed the outing" and the game was "a grand success". However, while private clubs were being established in Massachusetts after Wright's "experiment", no further golf was played at Franklin Park or any other public course in America through 1894.

Boston resident Willie Campbell, the Scotland-born professional at Brookline's The Country Club began petitioning the City of Boston to open a public links at Franklin Park. Because of these efforts, a 9-hole municipal course designed by Campbell opened at the park on October 26, 1896. The course was built on Country Park, a mile long and ¾ of a mile wide section, originally designed by Frederick Law Olmsted for the enjoyment of rural landscape for urban Bostonians. The cost of play was 25¢ for a double round of 9 holes, and the hours of operation were 7:00 a.m. to 9:00 p.m. daily, except for Sundays. The holes were named Harvard, Valley Gate, Schoolmaster, Pettigrew, Scarborough, Canterbury, Abbotts, Brooks and Misery. Campbell was named the first professional at the course.

The course was redesigned and expanded to 18 holes by Donald Ross in 1922. In recent years, course renovations have been done by Mark Mungeam of Mungeam Cornish Golf Design.

The first clubhouse was built in 1911. The building was destroyed during World War II when the hilltop was used for artillery guns. The second course clubhouse was built in 1949. Burned down in a suspicious fire in 1975, the building was subsequently reconstructed within the burned out shell of the old building in order to save money. This led to an unsatisfactory result, and the current clubhouse is the product of an entirely new design. It was built by the City of Boston for $3.4 million and was opened in 1998.

== Legacy ==
- After Willie Campbell's death in 1900, his widow Georgina Campbell was appointed by the City of Boston as a professional at the course, becoming the first female golf pro in the United States.
- George Franklin Grant, the first African American Harvard Dental School graduate, pioneered minority play at Franklin Park. He was an inventor of a wooden golf tee.
- Francis Ouimet, 1913 winner of the U.S. Open, honed his game at the course. Ouimet was an employee at Wright & Ditson.
- Both Tiger Woods and Chi-Chi Rodríguez have taught youth golf clinics at Franklin Park.

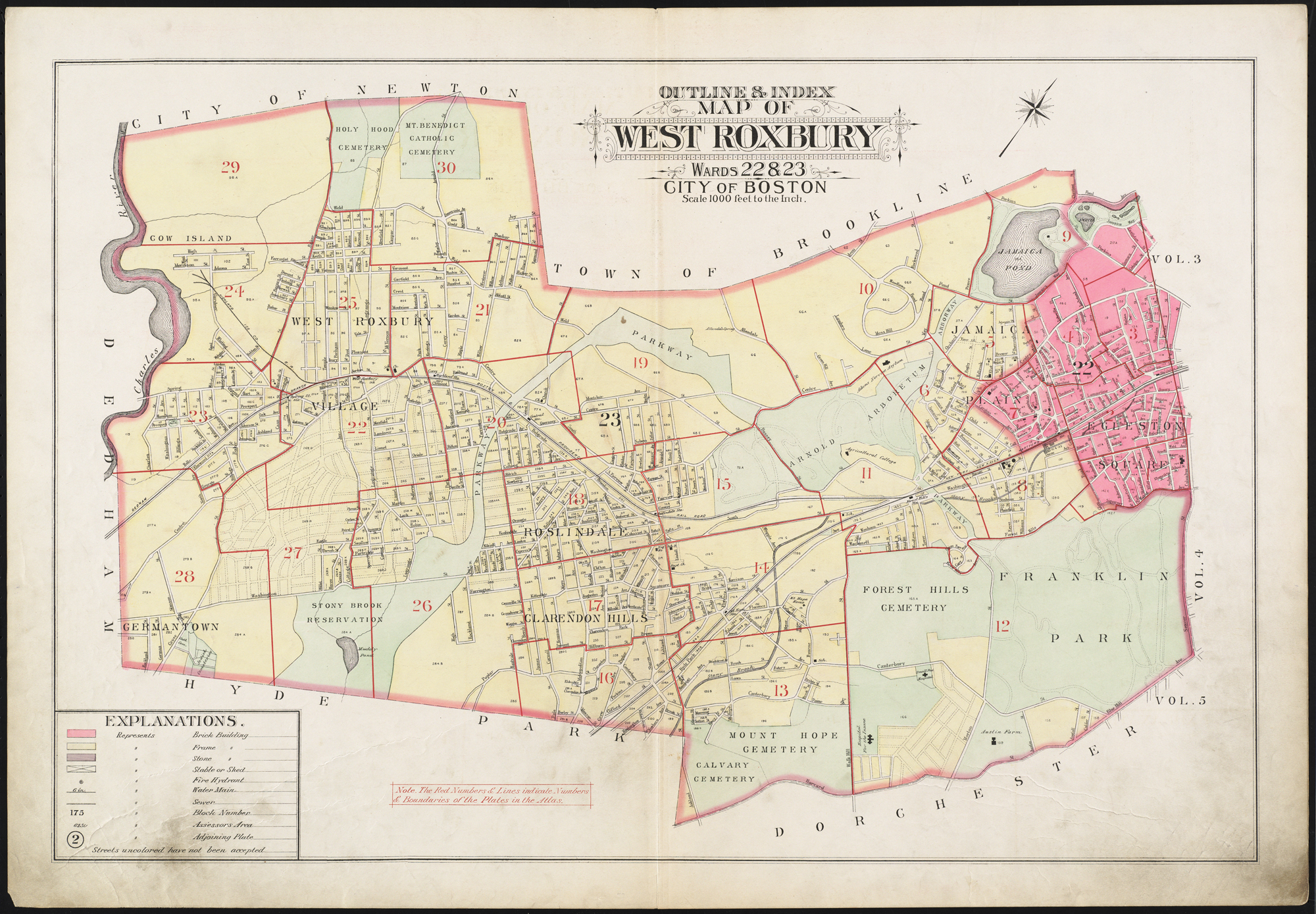
1896 Atlas of West Roxbury

== Location ==
Franklin Park links the neighborhoods of Jamaica Plain, Roxbury and Dorchester together due to its proximity to all three communities. Originally named West Roxbury Park, Frederick Law Olmsted planned and developed the park in the former municipality of West Roxbury (of which Jamaica Plain was a section), which was annexed to Boston in 1872. Roxbury lies across Seaver Street to the north and Dorchester across Blue Hill Avenue to the east.

The street address of the course has a Dorchester ZIP code, 1 Circuit Drive, Dorchester, MA 02121.

== Scorecard ==
William J. Devine Golf Course Scorecard
| Tee | Rating/Slope | 1 | 2 | 3 | 4 | 5 | 6 | 7 | 8 | 9 | Out | 10 | 11 | 12 | 13 | 14 | 15 | 16 | 17 | 18 | In | Total |
| Blue | 69.5 / 126 | 386 | 329 | 421 | 189 | 355 | 380 | 389 | 179 | 349 | 2976 | 342 | 533 | 404 | 139 | 358 | 164 | 337 | 287 | 473 | 3037 | 6013 |
| White | 67.3 / 122 | 373 | 306 | 410 | 181 | 333 | 355 | 373 | 160 | 334 | 2825 | 300 | 513 | 384 | 119 | 341 | 159 | 330 | 268 | 449 | 2863 | 5688 |
| Gold | 64.0 / 114 | 312 | 293 | 334 | 166 | 273 | 334 | 300 | 118 | 322 | 2452 | 285 | 475 | 308 | 103 | 258 | 152 | 315 | 210 | 366 | 2472 | 4924 |
| Par | | 4 | 4 | 4 | 3 | 4 | 4 | 4 | 3 | 4 | 34 | 4 | 5 | 4 | 3 | 4 | 3 | 4 | 4 | 5 | 36 | 70 |
| SI | | 7 | 13 | 3 | 15 | 9 | 5 | 1 | 17 | 11 | | 8 | 4 | 2 | 18 | 10 | 16 | 12 | 14 | 6 |
| Red | 67.0 / 112 | 309 | 235 | 329 | 162 | 265 | 326 | 292 | 116 | 280 | 2314 | 253 | 421 | 303 | 100 | 254 | 147 | 313 | 210 | 361 | 3418 | 4908 |
| Par | | 4 | 4 | 4 | 3 | 4 | 4 | 4 | 3 | 4 | 34 | 4 | 5 | 5 | 3 | 4 | 3 | 4 | 4 | 5 | 37 | 71 |
| SI | | 11 | 13 | 3 | 15 | 5 | 7 | 1 | 17 | 9 | | 10 | 4 | 6 | 18 | 12 | 14 | 2 | 16 | 8 |

== See also ==
- Franklin Park
- Emerald Necklace
- George Wright Golf Course
