= Jack Burns (golfer) =

Scottish golfer (1859–1927)

Personal information
- Full name: John Burns
- Nickname: Jack
- Nationality: Scotland
- Born: 7 January 1859 St Andrews, Scotland
- Died: 18 December 1927 (aged 68) St Andrews, Scotland

Career
- Sport: Golf
- Status: Professional

Best results in major championships (wins: 1)
- PGA Championship: DNP
- U.S. Open: DNP
- The Open Championship: Won: 1888

John Burns (7 January 1859 – 18 December 1927), a native of St Andrews, was a Scottish professional golfer for part of his life.

== Early life ==
Burns, the son of an Irish labourer, and started earning his living as a plasterer. However, there is reference to him being a professional golfer in the minutes of the St Andrews Golf Club in October 1885.

== Professional career ==
In 1887, Burns moved to Warwick, England to become the golf professional and greenskeeper at the newly formed Warwickshire Golf Club (now known as Warwick Golf Centre), the first golf club in Warwickshire. Burns returned to Scotland in October 1888 to become the winner of the Open Championship, which was held at the Old Course at St Andrews. The £8 prize of his major championship title accomplishment did not make him a fortune. He returned to his job in Warwick and was involved in the creation of the neighbouring golf course in Kenilworth in 1890.

He moved back to St Andrews in 1891 to work on the railways, but he carried on caddying. When he died in 1927, his profession was listed as a plasterer again.

== Major championships ==
=== Wins (1) ===
Year	Championship	Winning score	Margin	Runners-up
1888	The Open Championship	86-85=171	1 stroke	(Scotland) David Anderson Jr., (Scotland) Ben Sayers

=== Results timeline ===
Tournament	1882	1883	1884	1885	1886	1887	1888	1889
The Open Championship	T23			7			1	14

Tournament	1890	1891	1892	1893	1894	1895	1896	1897	1898	1899
The Open Championship		WD			45					

Tournament	1900	1901	1902	1903	1904	1905
The Open Championship						CUT

- Note: Burns only played in The Open Championship.
Win
Top 10
Did not play

CUT = missed the half-way cut
"T" indicates a tie for a place
