= Douglas Rolland =

Scottish golfer

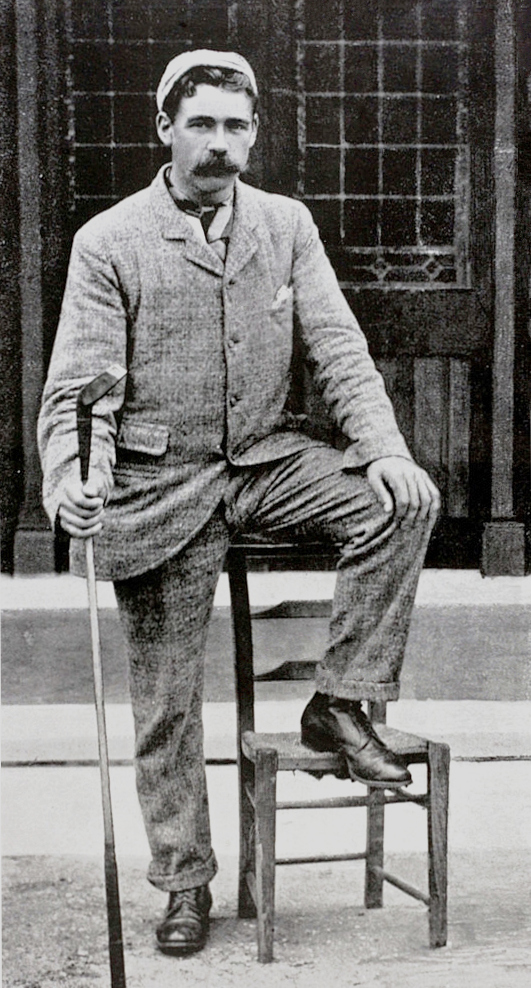
- Rolland c. 1895

Personal information
- Full name: John Erskine Douglas Stewart Rolland
- Nationality: Scotland
- Born: 4 January 1861 Kilconquhar, Scotland
- Died: August 1914 (aged 53) Hampshire, England

Career
- Sport: Golf
- Turned professional: c. 1879

Best results in major championships
- U.S. Open: DNP
- The Open Championship: T2: 1884, 1894

John Erskine Douglas Stewart Rolland (4 January 1861 – August 1914) was a Scottish professional golfer who played in the late 19th century. Rolland had a total of three top-10 finishes in the Open Championship, two of which were second-place finishes in the 1884 Open Championship and again in the 1894 Open Championship.

== Early life ==
Rolland was born in Kilconquhar, Scotland, on 4 January 1861, the son of Andrew Rolland and Isabella Rolland (née Harris). In his early teens he worked as a stonemason.

== Golf career ==
=== 1884 Open Championship ===
The 1884 Open Championship was held 3 October at Prestwick Golf Club in Prestwick, South Ayrshire, Scotland. Jack Simpson won the Championship by four strokes, ahead of runners-up Willie Fernie and Douglas Rolland. This was the first Open Championship to be played at Prestwick after it had been extended from 12 to 18 holes in 1882. The contest was still over 36 holes but consisted of two 18-hole rounds rather than three 12-hole rounds.

==== Details of play ====
Conditions were difficult with a strong wind. Simpson, one of the early starters, had the best score in both rounds and was the surprise winner. Fernie and Rolland were joint second and shared the second and third prizes.

=== 1894 Open Championship ===
The 1894 Open Championship was held 11–12 June at Royal St George's Golf Club in Sandwich, England. English professional J.H. Taylor won the Championship by five strokes from runner-up Rolland. This was the first Open Championship held outside Scotland.

==== Details of play ====
In a strong wind, many of the players struggled in their first round. Archie Simpson reached the turn in 39 but struggled coming back in 51, ending with a score of 90. The leader after the morning's play was Sandy Herd who was out in 41 and back in 42 for an 83. James Braid was back in 41 in the afternoon play but his score was ruined by a morning 91. Andrew Kirkaldy and Rolland had the afternoon's best scores of 79, but at the end of the day Taylor was the leader on 164 with Kirkaldy and Rolland on 165 and Ben Sayers on 166.

After the third round, Taylor had increased his lead to three strokes from Kirkaldy and to four over Rolland. Sayers, Herd and Alfred Toogood were the only others in contention. Kirkaldy had an excellent start in the last round reaching the turn in 36 but he had a seven at the 14th and eventually finished with an 84. Rolland had a steady 82, coming home in 42 strokes to lead Kirkaldy by a stroke. Taylor reached the turn in 37 and thus needed 48 more to beat Rolland. Despite a seven at the 13th he came back in 44 to finish with an 81, five ahead of Rolland. This was the first victory by a non-Scottish professional in the Open Championship.

== Death and legacy ==
Rolland died in August 1914. He is best remembered as a frequent competitor in the Open Championship who twice finished in second place.

== Results in major championships ==
Tournament	1882	1883	1884	1885	1886	1887	1888	1889	1890	1891	1892	1893	1894
The Open Championship	T13	T10	T2										2

Note: Rolland played only in The Open Championship.

Top 10
Did not play

WD = withdrew
"T" indicates a tie for a place
