= David Onri Anderson =

American painter

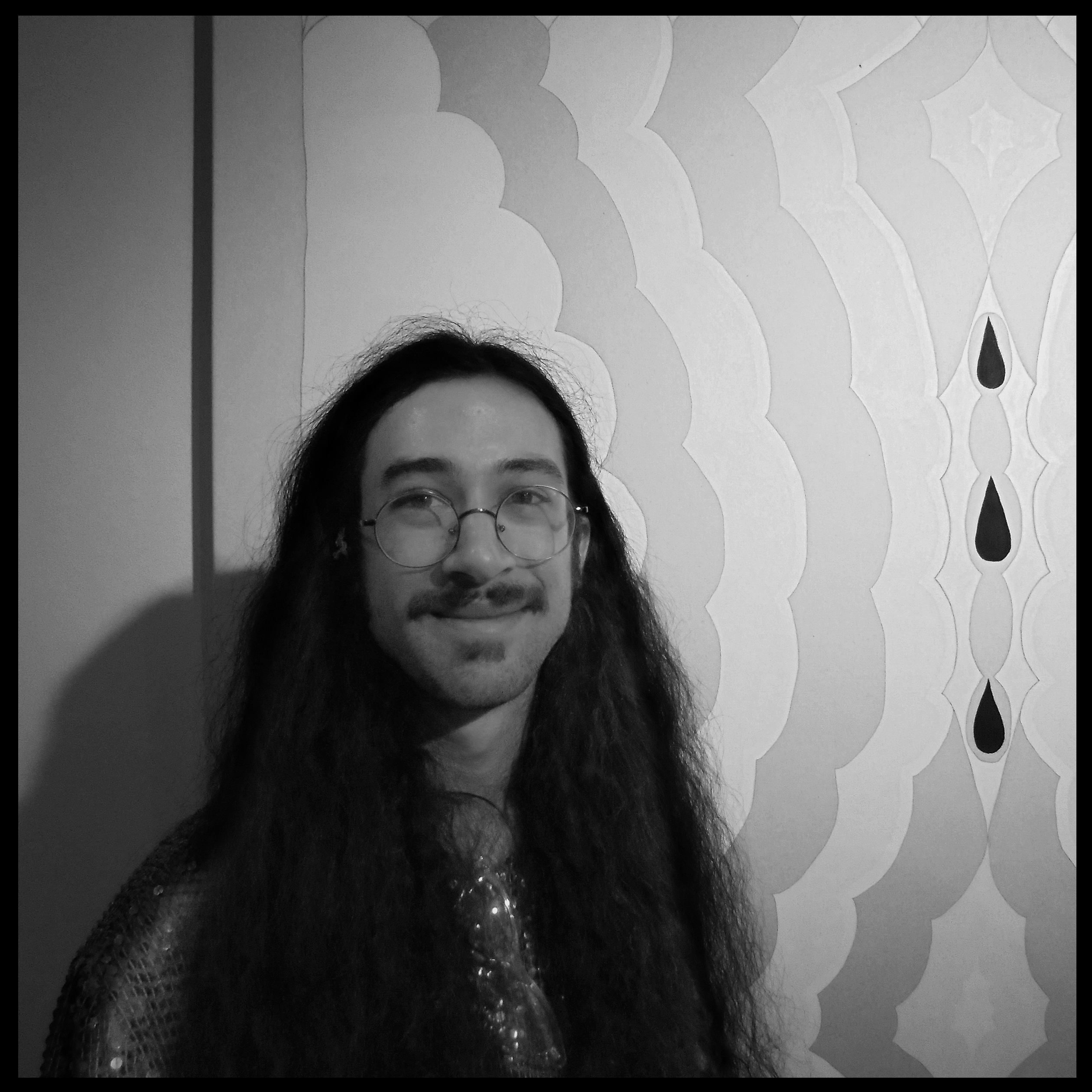
- Anderson in 2019 at the opening of his exhibition "Apple Core Peace Temple", at Patrick Painter Gallery in Santa Monica, California
- Born: 1993 (age 32–33); Nashville, Tennessee, United States
- Known for: Painting, Music, Curating
- Awards: 2016 Anny Gowa Purchase Award (Watkins College of Art, Nashville), 2017 Best Emerging Painter (Nashville Scene
- Website: davidonrianderson.com

David Onri Anderson is a Tennessee-born painter, musician and curator of French/Algerian ancestry, who emerged from the Nashville arts community in the mid-1990s. His large scale paintings are heavily influenced by nature, eastern Tantra artwork and Cosmic Philosophy and are sometimes accompanied by installation elements such as raw earth. His works frequently explore the spaces between oneness and variation. In 2016, he was awarded the Anny Gowa Purchase Award from Watkins College of Art, Design & Film and in 2017 considered by the publication Nashville Scene as Best Emerging Painter.

In early 2019, the artist's musical project, the metal-influenced Dream pop band called Onri (with fellow members Aaron Harper and Zack Rafuls), released their sixteen-track debut album, "Bed Bop".

== Solo exhibitions ==
- 2019 Patrick Painter Gallery “Apple Core Peace Temple”
- 2018 "Earthbound" Elephant Gallery, Nashville
- 2017 "Rice, Beans & Incense" Atlanta Contemporary, Atlanta
- 2017 "I’m So Glad I Got My Own" (Natural High), Fluorescent Gallery, Atlanta HUM,
- 2017 The Browsing Room, Nashville
- 2016 Paper Mind, Bijan Ferdwosi, Nashville
- 2016 "What’s In My Soup?" BFA Thesis Show, Brownlee O. Currey Gallery, Watkins College of Art, Nashville
- 2016 "Burial Boogie Woogie" 40AU, Nashville, TN
- 2015 Pop-Up Solo Exhibition, Oz Arts Center, Nashville
- 2014 "Desire Trap" - WAG, Nashville

== Group exhibitions ==
- 2018 Patrick Painter Gallery "Plastic Fantastic Lover" (works by David Onri Anderson & Carlson Hatton)

== Reviews and articles ==
- 2019 Hyperallergic “A Clown-Themed Art Show” by Emma Orlow
- 2019 Artspace “5 Shows By Emerging Artists” by Jake Sillen
- 2018 Art in America - “Earthbound” exhibit reviewed by Laura Hutson Hunter
- 2018 Number Inc.(interview written by Jesse Butcher
- 2017 USA TODAY (Tennessean)
