= David Andersen (cricketer) =

New Zealand cricketer (1939–2024)

Personal information
- Full name: Leslie David Andersen
- Born: 11 December 1939; Melbourne, Victoria, Australia
- Died: 22 October 2024 (aged 84); Whakatāne, New Zealand
- Batting: Left-handed
- Bowling: Left-arm medium

Domestic team information
- Years: Team
- 1960/61: Auckland
- 1967/68: Northern Districts

Career statistics
Competition	First-class
Matches	5
Runs scored	36
Batting average	7.20
100s/50s	0/0
Top score	15
Balls bowled	969
Wickets	10
Bowling average	45.20
5 wickets in innings	0
10 wickets in match	0
Best bowling	2/41
Catches/stumpings	2/–
- Source: ESPNcricinfo, 18 March 2021

Leslie David Andersen (11 December 1939 – 22 October 2024) was a New Zealand cricketer. He played in five first-class cricket matches for Auckland and Northern Districts between 1960 and 1968.
