= David Anderson (cricketer) =

Australian cricketer (1940–2005)

Personal information
- Born: 24 January 1940; Warrnambool, Australia
- Died: 17 June 2005 (aged 65); Sydney, Australia

Domestic team information
- Years: Team
- 1961-1969: Victoria
- Source: Cricinfo, 4 December 2015

David Anderson (24 January 1940 – 17 June 2005) was an Australian cricketer. He played 37 first-class cricket matches for Victoria between 1961 and 1969.

== See also ==
- List of Victoria first-class cricketers
