= David Anderson (artist) =

Scottish sculptor and painter

- Died: 1847; Liverpool, England
- Known for: sculpting, painting

David Anderson (died 1847) was a Scottish statuary and painter, described by Art UK as being "renowned". He was the father of sculptor William Anderson.

Anderson died in Liverpool in 1847.
