= Dave Anderson =

Dave Anderson may refer to:

- Dave Anderson (actor) (born 1945), Scottish actor, playwright and jazz musician
- Dave Anderson (alpine skier) (born 1979), Canadian former alpine skier
- Dave Anderson (boxer) (born 1965), British boxer
- Dave Anderson (cartoon writer) (born 1963), creator of Bastard Bunny and Bafta nominee for The Terribles
- Dave Anderson (footballer) (born 1962), football manager, former player and media personality from Northern Ireland
- Dave Anderson (infielder) (born 1960), former Major League Baseball shortstop/third baseman
- Dave Anderson (musician), bassist, member of Amon Düül II, Hawkwind and Space Ritual
- Dave Anderson (pitcher) (1868–1897), Major League Baseball pitcher
- Dave Anderson (sportswriter) (1929–2018), American sportswriter

== See also ==
- David Anderson (disambiguation)
