= David Andersson =

David Andersson may refer to:

- David Andersson (musician) (1975–2022), Swedish heavy metal guitarist (Soilwork)
- David Andersson (orienteer) (born 1981), Swedish orienteering competitor
- David Andersson (speed skater) (born 1994), Swedish speed skater

== See also ==
- David Anderson (disambiguation)
