= David Anderson Jr. =

Scottish golfer

Personal information
- Nationality: Scotland
- Born: 29 November 1867 St Andrews, Scotland
- Died: 1919 (aged 51-52) St Andrews, Scotland
- Spouse: Mary Ann Fernie
- Children: David, James, Ann, Helen, Mary, Elizabeth

Career
- Sport: Golf
- Status: Professional

Best results in major championships
- PGA Championship: DNP
- U.S. Open: DNP
- The Open Championship: T2: 1888

David Anderson Jr. (29 November 1867 – 1919) was a Scottish professional golfer who played in the late 19th century. Anderson tied for second place in the 1888 Open Championship with Ben Sayers. He also tied for 6th in the 1895 Open Championship.

== Early life ==
Anderson was born in St Andrews, Scotland, on 29 November 1867. He worked for his father David Anderson Sr., founder of D. Anderson & Sons with his four brothers. His grandfather was David "Da" Anderson, greenskeeper at the Old Course at St Andrews, and he was the nephew of Jamie Anderson, three-time Open champion. David Anderson Jr. went on to manage the Tommy Morris golf shop as did his son and grandson.

== Golf career ==
=== 1888 Open Championship ===
The 1888 Open Championship was the 28th Open Championship, held 6 October at the Old Course at St Andrews, Fife, Scotland. Jack Burns won the Championship by a stroke from David Anderson Jr. and Ben Sayers.

==== Details of play ====
Willie Campbell was in good form—working his way around in 84—and was the leader after 18 holes for the third consecutive year. Sayers was one shot further back on 85 and four players were bunched on 86.

In the afternoon Sayers, in the first group, scored 87 and took an early lead on 172. Campbell ran into difficulties on a few holes making a number of mistakes and scored 90 for a total of 174. Sayers was then joined on 172 by David Anderson. Playing a few groups behind, Burns carded an 85 and took the lead on 171, a score none of the later players could match.

Burns's score for his first round had originally been added up to 87 but a Royal and Ancient member noticed that it was added up incorrectly and the total was adjusted to 86, making Burns the champion.

== Death ==
Anderson died in 1919.

== Results in The Open Championship ==
Tournament	1885	1886	1887	1888	1889	1890	1891	1892	1893	1894	1895	1896	1897	1898	1899	1900	1901
The Open Championship	43	DNP	DNP	T2	DNP	14	T24	T16	22	DNP	T6	T24	DNP	DNP	DNP	T14	CUT

Note: Anderson played only in The Open Championship.
CUT = missed half-way cut
DNP = Did not play
"T" indicates a tie for a place
Yellow background for top-10
