= Royal Aberdeen Golf Club =

Golf course in Aberdeen, Scotland

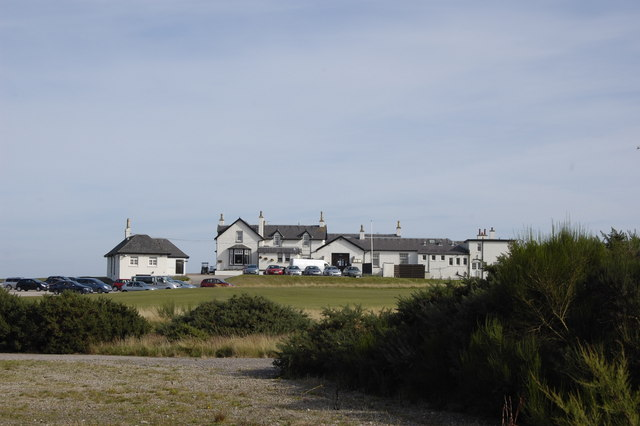

- Location in Scotland
- 57°10′42″N 2°05′01″W

Club information
- Location: Aberdeen, Scotland
- Established: 1780, 1888
- Type: Private
- Total holes: 36
- Website: royalaberdeengolf.com

Balgownie
- Designed by: Archie Simpson, Robert Simpson, James Braid (remodel)
- Par: 71
- Length: 6,918 yards (6,326 m)
- Course rating: 74.8
- Slope rating: 144
- Course record: 64 (Rory McIlroy)

Silverburn
- Par: 64
- Length: 4,021 yards (3,677 m)
- Course rating: 61

Royal Aberdeen Golf Club in Aberdeen, Scotland, was founded in 1780 and claims to be the sixth oldest golf club in the world. It was founded as the Society of Golfers at Aberdeen, and became the Aberdeen Golf Club in 1815 subsequently receiving royal patronage in 1903.

Royal Aberdeen is best known for hosting the 2005 Senior British Open, the 2011 Walker Cup, and the 2014 Scottish Open.

== History ==
Aberdeen can be closely linked to the origins of golf, the earliest reference to a golf hole in Scotland was made in local Aberdeen records dating back to 1625. Royal Aberdeen Golf Club was initially set up as The Society of Golfers at Aberdeen in 1780 making it the sixth oldest golf club in the world.

The club continued be known as The Society of Golfers at Aberdeen before forming The Aberdeen Golf Club in 1815. The club continued to play over The Queens Links area of Aberdeen where the original golf hole in 1625 was believed to have been. In 1976 play was expanded over the Kings Links area to the north of the Queens Links. Golf is still played to date on this land at the King's Links Golf Course.

The club moved to its present location at Ballgownie Links on the other side of the River Don estuary in 1888. The course gained its royal patronage from King Edward VII in 1903 and subsequently changed its name to Royal Aberdeen Golf Club.

The course was originally designed by Archie Simpson and Robert Simpson but was later re-bunkered and lengthened to its current layout by James Braid.

Since its expansion Royal Aberdeen has hosted many top golf tournaments both on an amateur and professional level including the Scottish Open, Senior British Open and the Walker Cup.

== Balgownie ==
The course runs essentially out and back along the North Sea shore. The outward nine (acknowledged as one of the finest in-links golf anywhere in the world), cuts its way through some dune formations.

The inland nine returns south over the flatter plateau. A traditional old Scottish links, it is well-bunkered with undulating fairways. It has a balance of holes, strong par 4's, tricky par 3's and two classic par 5's, with the 8th (signature hole) protected by nine bunkers. The changing wind, tight-protected greens and finish makes Balgownie a test for the best. It was praised by participants in the 2005 Senior British Open.

=== Quotes ===
The golf writer Sam McKinlay said "There are few courses in these islands with a better, more testing, more picturesque outward nine than Balgownie".

Bernard Darwin remarked "it represented a huge gap in my golfing education not to have played Balgownie until now, much more than a good golf course, a noble links!"

=== Scorecards ===
The scorecard of the Balgownie course is as follows (all distances are given in yards)

Tee	Rating/Slope	1	2	3	4	5	6	7	8	9	Out	10	11	12	13	14	15	16	17	18	In	Total
Blue	74.8 / 144	409	595	236	464	347	491	428	147	465	3582	354	165	534	436	441	374	411	181	440	3336	6918
White	73.0 / 141	409	567	207	430	324	491	374	147	454	3403	344	165	494	397	391	345	379	175	433	3123	6526
Yellow	71.8 / 138	399	549	202	377	291	473	367	139	436	3233	338	159	474	366	382	331	371	165	426	3012	6245
Par	Men's	4	5	3	4	4	5	4	3	4	36	4	3	5	4	4	4	4	3	4	35	71
Red	M:70.7 / 126 W:76.7 / 145	386	544	188	375	285	455	355	133	431	3152	300	153	468	360	381	282	362	135	422	2863	6015
Black	M:68.7 / 123 W:74.0 / 139	386	544	150	375	285	407	355	139	373	3014	241	153	468	260	381	282	291	135	342	2553	5567
Par	Women's	4	5	3	4	4	5	4	3	5	37	4	3	5	4	5	4	4	3	5	37	74
Green	M:66.5 / 115 W:72.0 / 133	386	427	150	375	219	407	294	133	373	2764	241	153	411	260	320	282	291	135	342	2435	5199
Par	Green	4	4	3	4	4	4	4	3	4	34	4	3	4	4	4	4	4	3	4	34	68
SI	All Tees	7	15	17	3	9	13	5	1	11		6	2	10	4	14	8	18	12	16

== Silverburn Course ==
The Silverburn Course is the second course at Royal Aberdeen Golf Course and measures 4,021 yards (3,677 m) over a par of 64

== Tournaments hosted ==
During its history Royal Aberdeen has hosted a number of top amateur and professional tournaments, between 1924 and 1980 the club hosted the Scottish Amateur seven times (1924, 1929, 1933, 1948, 1957, 1970, and 1980). Subsequently, the club hosted the Jacques Léglise Trophy for boys' team golf between Great Britain & Ireland and the Continent of Europe with Great Britain & Ireland claiming a 12½ to 11½ victory.

The club was chosen to host the 2005 The Senior British Open Championship, this was the first time the club had hosted a major championship on any golf tour, the tournament was won by Tom Watson with a 4-under par-score of 280 following a play-off against Des Smyth.

The club was also chosen to host the 2011 Walker Cup between Great Britain & Ireland and the United States, with Great Britain & Ireland claiming a 14 to 12 victory.

In 2014 the club hosted the Scottish Open on the European Tour. During the first round of the tournament, Rory McIlroy set a new course record with a 7-under-par 64. The tournament was won by Justin Rose with a total score of 16-under-par.

In 2018 Royal Aberdeen was the host club of the Amateur Championship, in which Jovan Rebula of South Africa defeated Robin Dawson of Ireland in the finals, 3&2.

== See also ==
- List of golf clubs granted Royal status
