= David Anderson (ice hockey) =

Canadian ice hockey player

- Born: July 30, 1962 (age 63) Vancouver, British Columbia, Canada
- Height: 6 ft 0 in (183 cm)
- Weight: 195 lb (88 kg; 13 st 13 lb)
- Position: Right wing
- Shot: Right
- Played for: IHL; Fort Wayne Komets; AHL; Maine Mariners; Utica Devils; BHL; Durham Wasps
- NHL draft: Undrafted
- Playing career: 1985–1989

David Anderson (born July 30, 1962) is a Canadian former professional ice hockey player.

== Playing career ==
Anderson attended the University of Denver where he played four seasons (1981 – 1985) of NCAA Division I hockey with the Denver Pioneers, scoring 56 goals and 71 assists for 127 points, while earning 198 penalty minutes, in 150 games played.

Anderson commenced his professional career with the 1985-86 Fort Wayne Komets of the International Hockey League. On August 6, 1986, he was signed as a free agent by the New Jersey Devils of the National Hockey League. As a member of the Devils' organization, Anderson as assigned to play with their American Hockey League affiliate, the Maine Mariners, for the 1986–87 season, and then with the Utica Devils for the 1987–88 season.

Anderson went overseas to play with the Durham Wasps of the British Hockey League before hanging up his skates following the 1988-89 season.

== Career statistics ==
			Regular season					Playoffs
Season	Team	League	GP	G	A	Pts	PIM	GP	G	A	Pts	PIM
1980–81	Nanaimo Clippers	BCJHL	37	34	35	69	73	—	—	—	—	—
1981–82	University of Denver	NCAA	43	10	10	20	42	—	—	—	—	—
1982–83	University of Denver	NCAA	30	5	10	15	27	—	—	—	—	—
1983–84	University of Denver	NCAA	38	23	27	50	75	—	—	—	—	—
1984–85	University of Denver	NCAA	39	18	24	42	54	—	—	—	—	—
1985–86	Fort Wayne Komets	IHL	75	33	41	74	156	15	4	7	11	55
1986–87	Maine Mariners	AHL	58	9	9	18	80	—	—	—	—	—
1987–88	Utica Devils	AHL	74	23	12	35	191	—	—	—	—	—
1988–89	Durham Wasps	BHL	34	73	70	143	55	5	7	9	16	8
AHL totals			133	32	21	53	271	—	—	—	—	—
