= Jack Simpson (golfer) =

Scottish golfer (1859–1895)

Personal information
- Full name: John Simpson
- Nickname: Jack
- Nationality: Scotland
- Born: 29 December 1859 Earlsferry, Scotland
- Died: 9 July 1895 (aged 35) Edinburgh, Scotland

Career
- Sport: Golf
- Status: Professional

Best results in major championships (wins: 1)
- The Open Championship: Won: 1884

John Simpson (29 December 1859 – 9 July 1895) was a Scottish professional golfer of the late 19th century.

== Early life ==
Simpson was born Earlsferry, Fife, and was one of six golfing brothers.

== Golf career ==
Simpson played his golf out of Carnoustie. He was a powerful but erratic player. Simpson won the 1884 Open Championship at Prestwick with a score of 160 for 36 holes, despite taking a nine at his second hole.

Simpson did not have any other high finishes at the Open and concentrated mainly on clubmaking. He was the first professional at Buxton and High Peak Golf Club.

== Death ==
In 1895, Simpson died unmarried of typhoid fever in Edinburgh.

== Major championships ==
=== Wins (1) ===
Year	Championship	18 holes	Winning score	Margin	Runners-up
1884	The Open Championship	2 shot lead	78-82=160	4 strokes	(Scotland) Willie Fernie, (Scotland) Douglas Rolland

=== Results timeline ===
Tournament	1883	1884	1885	1886	1887	1888	1889	1890	1891	1892	1893	1894
The Open Championship	T17	1	T13	T12	T12				T39	T28	T34	T38

- Note: Simpson played only in The Open Championship.
Win
Did not play

"T" indicates a tie for a place
