= Davie Grant =

Scottish golfer

- Grant is stymied on the 17th green at North Berwick, Scotland, and is attempting to chip his own ball over the ball that is blocking the hole (c. 1888).

Personal information
- Full name: David Grant, Sr.
- Nationality: Scotland
- Born: 16 July 1860 Leith, Scotland
- Died: 24 June 1903 (aged 42) North Berwick, Scotland
- Spouse: Isabella Thomson
- Children: 10

Career
- Sport: Golf
- Turned professional: c. 1877

Best results in major championships
- Masters Tournament: DNP
- PGA Championship: DNP
- U.S. Open: DNP
- The Open Championship: T6: 1888

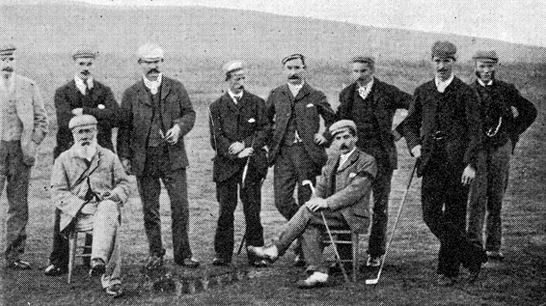
Grant (standing 4th from left), on 11 October 1894 at the New Luffness Competition. Among the famous golfers in the photo is the legendary Old Tom Morris (seated left). Ben Sayers is seated on the right.

Davie Grant, Sr. (16 July 1860 – 24 June 1903) was a Scottish professional golfer who played in the late 19th century. Grant was a frequent competitor in the Open Championship in the 1880s and 1890s and was very consistent with his results. His best effort came in the 1888 Open Championship where he finished tied for sixth place. In total, he had six top-10 performances.

== Early life ==
Grant was born 16 July 1860 in Wilson Court, Elbe Street, Leith, Scotland. He was the illegitimate son of Jane Grant, daughter of Daniel Grant, a blacksmith. David was raised by his aunt, Cecilia Grant, in Lochend Road, Leith. His mother Jane married Lawrence Hay and they lived in Earlston.

On leaving school Grant was employed cleaning train engines at St Margaret's Works, Edinburgh, and at the age of 18 he moved to North Berwick and was living at 11 Forth Street. He married Isabella Thomson from North Berwick, part of the Thomson golfing dynasty. Her sister Catherine married Ben Sayers and their brother was Wilfred Thomson. The eldest sister, Emily Thomson, married James White and their son Jack White won the 1904 Open Championship.

Grant was a man of small stature with fair hair and a moustache. In 1892, he was engaged by Lord Tweeddale—chairman of the North British Railway Company and former captain of North Berwick Golf Club (1890)—to design the course at Silloth in Cumbria. Grant was assisted by Mungo Park who became the first professional at Silloth. During his playing career Grant formed a formidable partnership with his brother-in-law Ben Sayers in fourball matches. On one occasion they defeated the brother duo of Andrew Kirkaldy and Hugh Kirkaldy in a well publicized money match.

== 1888 Open Championship ==
The 1888 Open Championship was held 6 October at the Old Course at St Andrews, Fife, Scotland. Jack Burns won the Championship by a stroke from David Anderson, Jr. and Ben Sayers. Grant played solid golf and finished in a tie for sixth place. He carded rounds of 88-88=176 and won 10 shillings.

== Death ==
Grant died on 24 June 1903 of tuberculosis at age 42. He left behind a wife and 10 children.

== Results in The Open Championship ==
Tournament	1878	1879	1880	1881	1882	1883	1884	1885	1886	1887	1888	1889	1890	1891	1892	1893	1894
The Open Championship	?		T8						T8	T7	T6	T7	T7	T15	T31	T17	T20

Note: Grant played only in The Open Championship.

Top 10
Did not play

? = played, finish unknown
"T" indicates a tie for a place
