= Bob Martin (golfer) =

Scottish golfer (c.1853–1917)

Personal information
- Full name: Robert Martin
- Nationality: Scotland
- Born: c. 1853 Cupar, Scotland
- Died: 9 March 1917 (aged 64) Strathkinness, Scotland

Career
- Sport: Golf
- Status: Professional

Best results in major championships (wins: 2)
- Masters Tournament: NYF
- PGA Championship: DNP
- U.S. Open: DNP
- The Open Championship: Won: 1876, 1885

Robert Martin (c. 1853 – 9 March 1917) was a Scottish golfer from St Andrews. He was runner-up in The Open Championship at Prestwick in 1875 and he won the Open at St Andrews in 1876 and 1885.

== Career ==
Martin was born at Cupar, Scotland, circa 1853.

Martin was a frequent competitor in The Open Championship in the late 19th century. In total, he had ten top-10 finishes including wins in the 1876 and 1885 Open Championship tournaments.

He died on 9 March 1917 at Strathkinness, Scotland, of pulmonary tuberculosis.

== Major championships ==
=== Wins (2) ===
Year	Championship	18 holes	Winning score	Margin	Runner-up
1876	The Open Championship	Tied for lead	86-90=176	Playoff ^{1}	(Scotland) Davie Strath
1885	The Open Championship (2)	1 shot deficit	84-87=171	1 stroke	(Scotland) Archie Simpson

^{1} Strath failed to participate in the playoff, so Martin won by default.

=== Results timeline ===
Tournament	1873	1874	1875	1876	1877	1878	1879
The Open Championship	T9	4	2	1	T8	T4	17

Tournament	1880	1881	1882	1883	1884	1885	1886	1887	1888	1889
The Open Championship		4	T3			1		2	T15	

Tournament	1890	1891	1892	1893	1894	1895
The Open Championship		T32				WD

Note: Martin played only in The Open Championship.

Win
Top 10
Did not play

"T" indicates a tie for a place
