= David Brown (golfer) =

Scottish professional golfer (1861–1936)

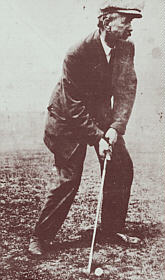

Personal information
- Nationality: Scotland
- Born: 9 May 1861 Musselburgh, Scotland
- Died: 8 July 1936 (aged 75) Inveresk, Scotland

Career
- Sport: Golf
- Status: Professional

Best results in major championships (wins: 1)
- Masters Tournament: DNP
- PGA Championship: DNP
- U.S. Open: 2nd: 1903
- The Open Championship: Won: 1886

David "Deacon" Brown (9 May 1861 – 8 July 1936) was a Scottish professional golfer who played in the late 19th and early 20th century. He won the 1886 Open Championship and finished second in the 1903 U.S. Open. In total, he had twelve top-10 finishes in major championship tournaments.

== Early life and career ==
Brown was born on 9 May 1861 in Musselburgh, Scotland. He was a roofing slater by trade and a keen golfer. In 1886, he was working in Musselburgh when The Open Championship was about to be played. John Anderson, who was secretary of the Musselburgh Club at the time, invited him to play and provided him with a pair of striped trousers, a frock coat and a lum hat to wear. He shocked the professionals by winning the tournament by two shots from Willie Campbell, carding rounds of 38-41-37-41=157, and then turned professional himself.

== Later life ==
Brown was hired by Hayling Island Golfing Club (now Hayling Golf Club) in early 1885 as greenkeeper following the departure of Joseph Lloyd as Professional/Greenkeeper where The Field reported in an April report of the Spring Meeting of that year that 'great satisfaction was expressed at the improvement made in the state of the green since the charge of it was undertaken by David Brown of Musselburgh'. Brown moved permanently to England to become club professional at Newbiggin by the Sea Golf Club in about 1888, and later worked at Malvern Club. He played in the Open Championship regularly and featured prominently. At the turn of the century he moved to Boston in the United States. In 1903 he tied with Willie Anderson for first place in the U.S. Open after 72 holes, but he lost the playoff. Brown enjoyed playing the stock market but lost most of his wealth during the Wall Street crash of 1929 and returned to Musselburgh, where he died in 1936.

== Death and legacy ==
Brown died on 8 July 1936 in Inveresk, Scotland. He is best remembered for winning the 1886 Open Championship and finishing second in the 1903 U.S. Open.

== Major championships ==
=== Wins (1) ===
Year	Championship	18 holes	Winning score	Margin	Runner-up
1886	The Open Championship	1 shot deficit	38-41-37-41=157	2 strokes	(Scotland) Willie Campbell

=== Results timeline ===
Tournament	1880	1881	1882	1883	1884	1885	1886	1887	1888	1889
The Open Championship	T4			T24			1	9		T4

Tournament	1890	1891	1892	1893	1894	1895	1896	1897	1898	1899
The Open Championship	10	7	24		T13	T6	T7	T7		CUT

Tournament	1900	1901	1902	1903	1904	1905	1906	1907	1908
U.S. Open		7	T12	2		53		T8	T12
The Open Championship			CUT						

Note: Brown played in only the two Opens.

Win
Top 10
Did not play

CUT = missed the half-way cut
"T" indicates a tie for a place
