= Archie Simpson =

Scottish golfer, golf course designer and club maker

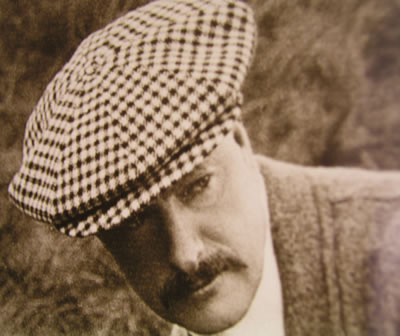

Personal information
- Full name: Archibald Simpson
- Nationality: Scotland; United States
- Born: 14 March 1866 Earlsferry, Scotland
- Died: January 1955 (aged 88) Detroit, Michigan, U.S.
- Spouse: Isabella Leslie Low
- Children: 4

Career
- Sport: Golf
- Status: Professional

Best results in major championships
- Masters Tournament: DNP
- PGA Championship: DNP
- U.S. Open: DNP
- The Open Championship: 2nd/T2: 1885, 1890

Archibald Simpson (14 March 1866 – January 1955) was a Scottish-American professional golfer. He was also a golf course designer and a golf club maker. He was runner-up in The Open Championship in 1885 (won by Bob Martin), and 1890 (won by John Ball).

== Early years ==
Simpson was born on 14 March 1866 in Earlsferry, Fifeshire, Scotland, to Alexander Simpson and Mary Simpson née Stewart. His was a notable golfing family, which included an elder brother, Bob Simpson, a Carnoustie-based club maker. His cousin was the golfer James Braid. As a boy, Simpson was the favourite caddy of Sir Alexander Grant, principal of the University of Edinburgh, and a regular at the Elie Golf Club course in Earlsferry, where Simpson grew up.

== Family ==
On 28 April 1891, he married Isabella Leslie Low in Edinburgh at the Court House by warrant of Sheriff Substitute of the Lothian and Peebles. The Simpsons had four children—Archibald, Mary, Isabella and Grace. All of their children were born between 1893 and 1906. His wife Isabella was born at Panmore Works Cottages, Barry, Carnoustie, on 21 July 1867. In the 1920s he applied for, and was granted, American citizenship.

George Low Sr. apprenticed under Simpson in his club-making business.

== Golf career ==
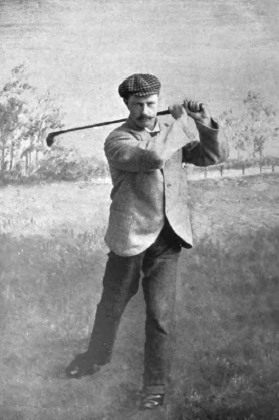
Simpson in the follow through, c. 1895

Fellow professional and golf historian Horace Hutchinson speculated that Simpson was first engaged in golf at Bembridge, before removing to Carnoustie, and then several years at the end of the 19th century at Balgownie, near Aberdeen, where he partnered with Ben Sayers. He was a professional and greenkeeper at the Royal Aberdeen Golf Club course between 1894 and 1911, during which he designed the new Murcar Links course to the north in 1909. He is credited with building at least two other golf courses at Aberdeen city's Deeside Golf Club, the Blair's Course as well as the Haughton Course.

== Later years ==
He was later a professional at Royal Isle of Wight Golf Club from 1890 to 1891, Prestwick Golf Club from 1892 to 1893, and Carnoustie Golf Links in 1891–92, 1893–94 and again in 1921, after spending 10 years in Detroit, Michigan, US. In Scotland, aside from the Murcar Links course, he designed the courses at Balgownie Golf Club, Nairn, and Cruden Bay Golf Club (with Braid).

He returned to the United States in 1922, where he designed the Vincennes Country Club course in Indiana, and became a professional member there. He later moved to Tam O'Shanter in Detroit and Clovernook Golf Club in Cincinnati, Ohio, as well as working in Illinois, but retired in Detroit.

== Death and legacy ==
Simpson died in 1955 in Detroit, Michigan. He was undoubtedly a fine golfer but is primarily known for his club-making skills and golf course architecture.

== Results in major championships ==
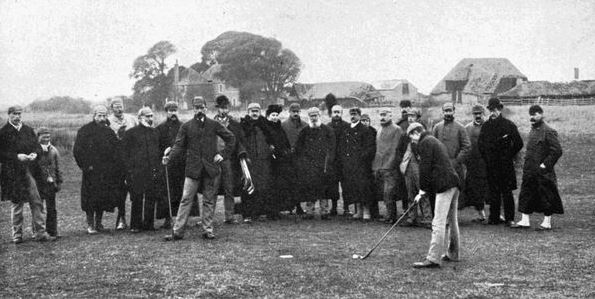
Simpson is on the tee box and in position to hit his drive while Douglas Rolland (left) prepares to hit next (c. 1894).

Tournament	1882	1883	1884	1885	1886	1887	1888	1889
The Open Championship	?	DNP	DNP	2	T4	T5	T15	12

Tournament	1890	1891	1892	1893	1894	1895	1896	1897	1898	1899
The Open Championship	T2	T12	9	14	T13	5	T12	T7	T15	T16

Tournament	1900	1901	1902	1903	1904	1905	1906
The Open Championship	T7	DNP	T30	T30	CUT	T18	T35

Note: Simpson played only in The Open Championship.
DNP = Did not play
CUT = missed the half-way cut
? = competed, finish unknown
"T" indicates a tie for a place
Yellow background for top-10

== Team appearances ==
- England–Scotland Professional Match (representing Scotland): 1904 (tie)
