= Willie Campbell (golfer) =

Scottish professional golfer (1862–1900)

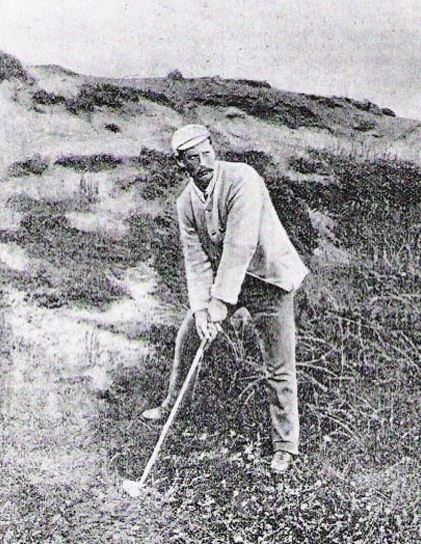
- Campbell, c. 1885, preparing to hit a shot

Personal information
- Nationality: Scotland; United States
- Born: 14 July 1862 Musselburgh, Scotland
- Died: 25 November 1900 (aged 38) Dorchester, Massachusetts
- Spouse: Georgina Campbell
- Children: 2

Career
- Sport: Golf
- Status: Professional

Best results in major championships
- Masters Tournament: DNP
- PGA Championship: DNP
- U.S. Open: 6th: 1895
- The Open Championship: 2nd: 1886

Willie Campbell (14 July 1862 in Musselburgh, Scotland – 25 November 1900 in Dorchester, Massachusetts) was a Scottish professional golfer. He reached the top ten in The Open Championship eight times in the 1880s. Campbell emigrated to America in 1894. He finished alone in sixth place in the 1895 U.S. Open which was the first U.S. Open, held on Friday, 4 October, at Newport Golf Club in Newport, Rhode Island.

== Early life ==
Like many golfers from his era, he started out as a caddie at the links at Musselburgh. At this time he and David Brown—along with Willie Park, Jr. and Willie Dunn—were a quartet of "boy wonders" who would all become golf champions. The most noteworthy incident in this early portion of his career was his defeat of Bob Ferguson—a champion golfer who won The Open Championship in three successive years from 1880 to 1882—when he was only 13 years old. Campbell's strength was his ability in match play. In 1882, when Campbell was 20 years old, an admirer offered to back him against the world for $30,000. From 1883 to 1888 he played anyone who would accept his challenge to play for money and never lost during that period.

== Golf career ==
Campbell was one of the first foreign professional golfers to come to the United States, and his coming was due to W. B. Thomas, who was at the time of Campbell's death in 1900 serving as president of the United States Golf Association. Campbell served for many years as the head professional at The Country Club, located in Brookline, Massachusetts near Boston, which would later play host to the famous 1913 U.S. Open won by Francis Ouimet. In the 1895 U.S. Open at Newport Country Club he came in sixth. Campbell resigned his post at The Country Club in 1896 to become professional at the Myopia Hunt Club. He final post before his death was at the municipal links at Franklin Park in Boston.

During his career, Campbell taught a number of players the finer points of golf. Among his students was H. J. Whigham who would go on to win the U.S. Amateur in 1896 and 1897.

== The 1887 Open Championship at Prestwick ==
The 1887 Open Championship was played in almost incessant rain and a cross wind. Campbell was the warm favourite amongst the local crowd and was followed by the majority of the spectators. Despite all his success his most famous golfing moment—which turned out to be a disastrous failure—would come here, at Prestwick, where Campbell was an assistant professional. Late in the final round he was in good shape to win but heeled his tee shot at the 16th hole and found a deep bunker (later dubbed Campbell's grave). The gallery tried to convince him to play backward but unfortunately he ignored their advice and took eight on the hole. Willie Park, Jr. would go on to win by a single stroke.

== Death ==
In his final days he had been confined to his home for about a month with lingering illnesses, including malaria, and he finally succumbed to cancer on 25 November 1900. His wife and his two children were at his bedside when he died. Interment was at Forest Hills Cemetery in Boston, Massachusetts.

== Results in major championships ==
Tournament	1880	1881	1882	1883	1884	1885	1886	1887	1888	1889
The Open Championship	T11	T5		T5	T4	T9	2	3	4	T7

Tournament	1890	1891	1892	1893	1894	1895	1896	1897	1898
U.S. Open	NYF	NYF	NYF	NYF	NYF	6	14		26
The Open Championship	WD	T24	33	WD					

Note: Campbell never played in the Masters Tournament or the PGA Championship.

Top 10
Did not play

NYF = tournament not yet founded
WD = withdrew
"T" indicates a tie for a place
