= Ben Sayers =

Scottish professional golfer, golf architect and manufacturer (1856–1924)

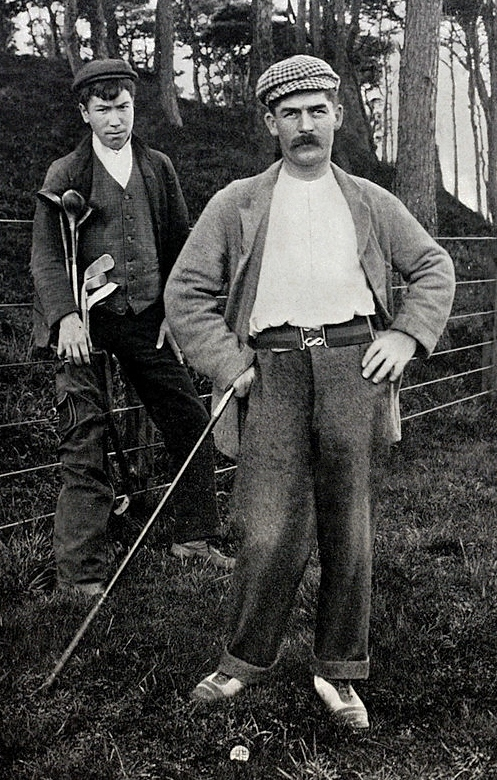
- Sayers (right) c. 1885

Personal information
- Full name: Bernard Sayers
- Nickname: Ben
- Nationality: Scotland
- Born: 23 June 1856 Leith, Edinburgh, Scotland
- Died: 9 March 1924 (aged 67) North Berwick, Scotland
- Height: 5 ft 3 in (1.60 m)
- Spouse: Catherine Thomson

Career
- Sport: Golf
- Status: Professional

Best results in major championships
- Masters Tournament: DNP
- PGA Championship: DNP
- U.S. Open: DNP
- The Open Championship: T2: 1888

Bernard "Ben" Sayers (23 June 1856 – 9 March 1924) was a Scottish professional golfer, who later became a distinguished golf teacher, golf course designer and manufacturer of golf clubs and equipment. Sayers had a reputation for making good quality gutta-percha golf balls.

== Playing career ==
Sayers was born in Leith, Edinburgh, Scotland. After moving to Haddington with his family at the age of 12, Sayers began to play golf after being given a club by his uncle. He was short at 5 ft 3 in (1.60 m) but strong, and on the verge of becoming a professional acrobat when he began to take golf seriously. He moved to North Berwick and after enjoying success in competitions at Dunbar, Hoylake and other courses he took up ballmaking, and also began to enter The Open Championship. He tied for second in the 1888 Open Championship and was third in 1889. Although he won 24 top-level tournaments he never lifted the "Old Claret Jug".

In January 1911, he took up the post of head professional at The Golf Club of Monte Carlo. While there, he was known for taking wagers on the course, presumably betting on himself against all takers of his challenges.

== Instructor, club maker, and golf course architect ==
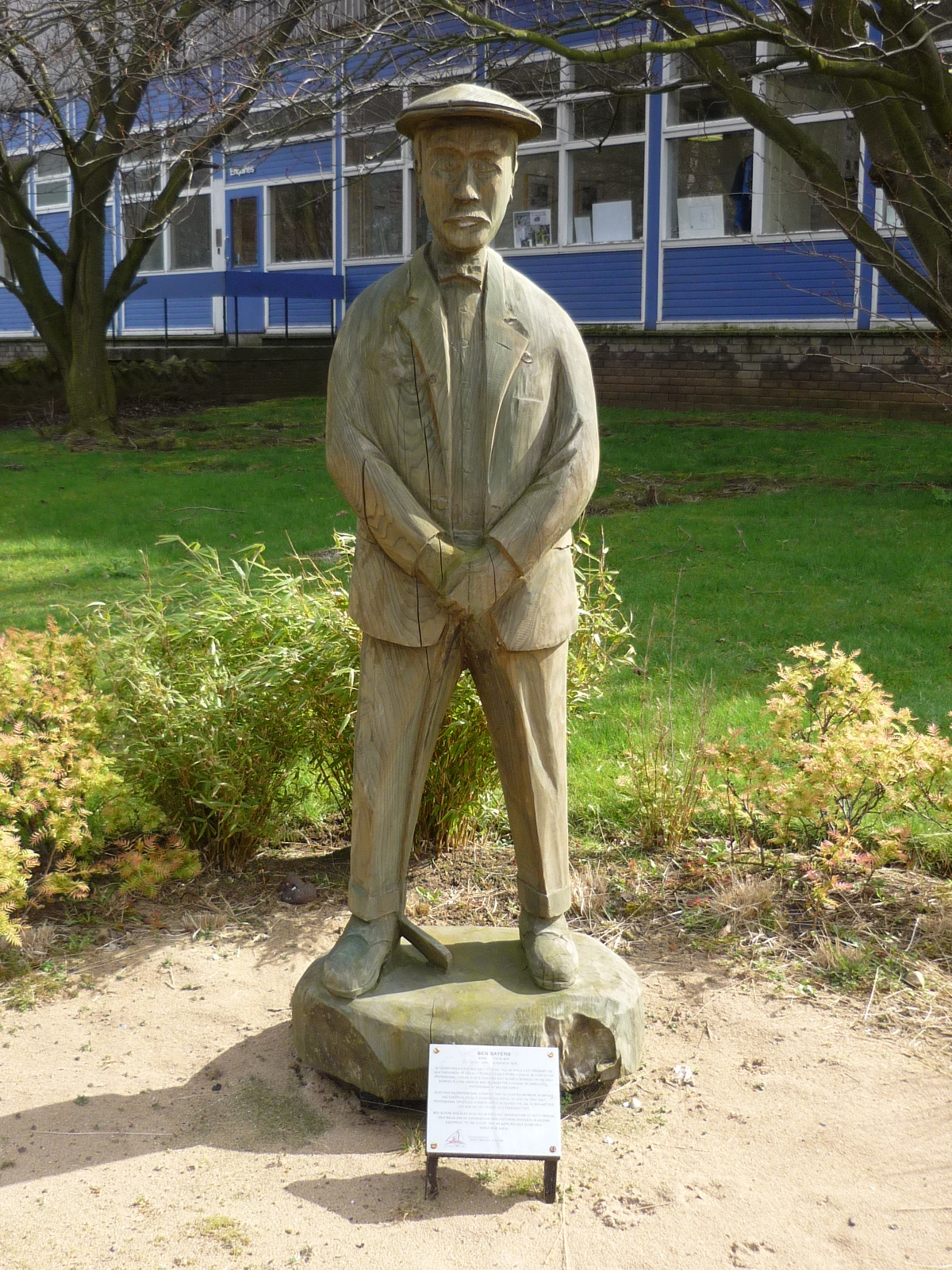
Statue of Ben Sayers outside the former factory in North Berwick

Sayers was a golf instructor to royalty, nobility and fellow professionals. In his day he taught Her Majesty Queen Alexandra, George, Prince of Wales (later King George V), Princess Victoria, the Duchess of Connaught and Princess Patricia of Connaught. He also instructed the great lady champion Dorothy Campbell (a member of the World Golf Hall of Fame) and Frenchman Arnaud Massy, who became the first overseas player to win the Open Championship.

He was also an innovative club maker, and patented several new club designs (see for example GB 21,122 and GB 24,473).

His course designing credits include the East course at North Berwick, Moffat, Rothesay, Craigielaw Links, the Merchants of Edinburgh, Adare Manor, West Monmouthshire, the Spey Bay Golf Club in Banffshire, and the Ballathie Hotel course in Perthshire.

== Ben Sayers & Son ==
The Ben Sayers & Son factory in North Berwick was responsible for creating several revolutionary pieces of golf equipment, from gutta-percha balls and the "Benny" putter (the first to have a square-edged handgrip) to, in later years, the first set of carbon-shafted clubs and a specially commissioned putter for Jack Nicklaus. Ben Sayers Jnr. also designed the first "oversized" driver (the "Dreadnaught").

Ben Sayers is believed to be the oldest golf equipment company still surviving. Now owned by Tandem Group, after operating from North Berwick for 126 years, production was moved to China in 2003.

== Death and legacy ==
Sayers died on 9 March 1924 at North Berwick, Scotland. He was one of the best players to play in the Open Championship and never win.

== Results in The Open Championship ==
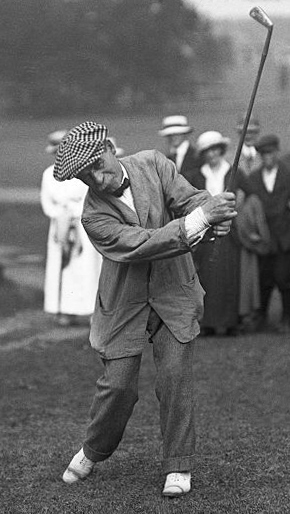
Sayers in 1915.

| Tournament | 1878 | 1879 |
|---|---|---|
| The Open Championship | 12 | 18 |

| Tournament | 1880 | 1881 | 1882 | 1883 | 1884 | 1885 | 1886 | 1887 | 1888 | 1889 |
|---|---|---|---|---|---|---|---|---|---|---|
| The Open Championship | 19 | ? | T18 | 7 | 6 | 15 | T16 | T5 | T2 | 3 |

| Tournament | 1890 | 1891 | 1892 | 1893 | 1894 | 1895 | 1896 | 1897 | 1898 | 1899 |
|---|---|---|---|---|---|---|---|---|---|---|
| The Open Championship | 19 | T10 | T5 | 12 | T5 | T9 | T7 | T12 | T19 | 11 |

| Tournament | 1900 | 1901 | 1902 | 1903 | 1904 | 1905 | 1906 | 1907 | 1908 | 1909 |
|---|---|---|---|---|---|---|---|---|---|---|
| The Open Championship | 9 | CUT | 19 | T21 | T10 | 35 | CUT | T46 | T30 | T17 |

| Tournament | 1910 | 1911 | 1912 | 1913 | 1914 |
|---|---|---|---|---|---|
| The Open Championship | DNP | CUT | DNP | DNP | T50 |

Note: Sayers played only in The Open Championship.
DNP = Did not play
CUT = missed the half-way cut
? = Competed, finish unknown
"T" indicates a tie for a place
Yellow background for top-10

== Team appearances ==
- England–Scotland Professional Match (representing Scotland): 1903 (winners), 1904 (tie), 1905 (tie), 1906, 1907, 1909, 1910, 1912 (tie), 1913
