= Willie Fernie (golfer) =

Scottish golfer and golf course architect

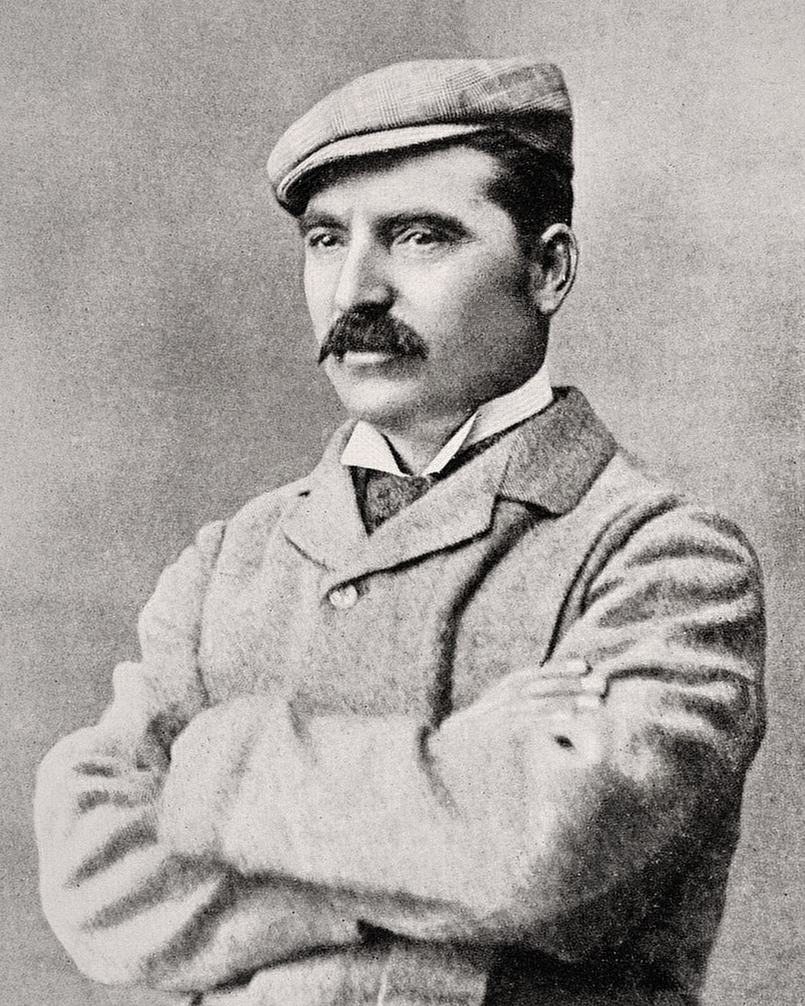
- Fernie, c. 1900

Personal information
- Full name: William Fernie
- Nationality: Scotland
- Born: 7 May 1855 St Andrews, Scotland
- Died: 24 June 1924 (aged 69) Glasgow, Scotland

Career
- Sport: Golf
- Status: Professional

Best results in major championships (wins: 1)
- U.S. Open: DNP
- The Open Championship: Won: 1883

William Fernie (7 May 1855 – 24 June 1924) was a Scottish professional golfer and golf course architect from St Andrews. He won the 1883 Open Championship at Musselburgh Links. The tournament was scheduled to last four rounds of the nine-hole course on a Friday in November. Fernie tied with defending champion Bob Ferguson, with both men shooting 158. The following day Fernie won a playoff by a single stroke.

== Career ==
Fernie was born in St Andrews, Scotland, on 7 May 1855.

Fernie was runner-up in the Open Championship in 1882, 1884, 1890 and 1891. When George Strath left Royal Troon in 1887, Fernie took over as club professional and served for 37 years only retiring in January 1924, a few months before his death. As a golf course designer he made alterations to the Old Course at St Andrews and Royal Troon, and designed Turnberry's Ailsa, Felixstowe Ferry Golf Club and Isle of Arran courses. He also designed Appleby Golf Club in 1903, and Dumfries and County Golf Club in 1912.

Fernie is credited with designing 28 courses across the UK. While at Troon, Fernie earned a reputation as an exceptional instructor and served as a mentor to many young, local aspiring golfers including the seven Campbell brothers from Troon, all of whom became golf professionals – Alex (Nipper) Campbell who became the head pro at Brookline and Baltimore Country Club; Jack (Jock) Campbell, who became the head pro at the Huntingdon Valley, Overbrook and Old York Road Country Clubs in Philadelphia; Andrew Campbell who would become the long-time head professional at the Springhaven Club, west of Philadelphia; Dave Campbell, who would become an assistant to his brothers in Philadelphia before securing a more permanent position as an assistant at the Hollywood Country Club in Deal, New Jersey; Robert Campbell, an excellent golfer who finished in the Scottish Open and was killed in the service during World War I; and James Campbell who held a head professional position in Greensboro, North Carolina.

== Personal life ==
Two of his sons, Tom and Harry withdrew from 1924 Open qualifying at Royal Liverpool Golf Club because of their father's illness. Tom Fernie had finished fifth in the 1923 Open at Troon.

Fernie died in Glasgow, Scotland, on 24 June 1924. He is best remembered for winning the 1883 Open Championship and finishing second four times.

== Golf courses (original design) ==
- Appleby Golf Club
- Craigie Hill GC
- Drumpellier Golf Club
- Dumfries and County Golf Club
- Dumfries and Galloway Golf Club
- Elderslie Golf Club
- Erskine Golf Club
- Felixstowe Ferry Golf Club
- Gatehouse of Fleet Golf Club
- Greenock Whinhill Golf Club
- Lamlash Golf Club
- Machrie Bay Golf Club
- New Cumnock Golf Club
- Pitlochry Golf Club
- Ralston Golf Club
- Royal Troon (Relief Course)
- Sanquhar Golf Club
- Seacroft Golf Club
- Shiskine Golf Club
- Southerndown Golf Club
- Stirling Golf Club
- Strathaven Golf Club
- Strathendrick Golf Club
- Thornhill Golf Club
- Turnberry (Ailsa)
- Turnberry (Arran)
- Whitecraigs Golf Club
- Whitsand Bay GC

== Golf courses (renovation) ==
- Royal Troon (Old)
- St. Andrews (Old)

== Major championships ==
=== Wins (1) ===
Year	Championship	18 holes	Winning score	Margin	Runner-up
1883	The Open Championship	2 shot lead	38-37-40-43=158	Playoff^{1}	(Scotland) Bob Ferguson

^{1}In a 36-hole playoff, Fernie defeated Ferguson by 1 stroke.

=== Results timeline ===
Tournament	1873	1874	1875	1876	1877	1878	1879
The Open Championship	T9						T8

Tournament	1880	1881	1882	1883	1884	1885	1886	1887	1888	1889
The Open Championship		8	2	1	T2	T4	T8	T7	14	6

Tournament	1890	1891	1892	1893	1894	1895	1896	1897	1898	1899
The Open Championship	T2	T2	8	T23	T5	T6	T3	T22	7	T5

Tournament	1900	1901	1902	1903	1904	1905	1906
The Open Championship	CUT	CUT	T12	T24	CUT	T31	CUT

- Note: Fernie played only in The Open Championship.
Win
Top 10
Did not play

CUT = missed the half-way cut
"T" indicates a tie for a place

== Team appearances ==
- England–Scotland Professional Match (representing Scotland): 1903 (winners), 1904 (tie)
