= Chronological list of men's major golf champions =

As of the 2026 season, 478 major championships have been played. 236 golfers have won one of men's professional golf's four major championships – the modern accepted definition of the majors has only existed since the 1960s but wins in these tournaments have been retrospectively recognized by all the major sanctioning organizations.

== By year ==
For details of the flag icons, see: List of National Flags

Year	Order (Note: Chronological order O – Open Championship, U – U.S. Open, P – PGA Championship, M – Masters Tournament.)	The Open Championship	U.S. Open	PGA Championship	Masters Tournament
1860	O	(Scotland) Willie Park Sr. (1/4)	tournament started in 1895	tournament started in 1916	tournament started in 1934
1861	O	(Scotland) Old Tom Morris (1/4)	tournament started in 1895	tournament started in 1916	tournament started in 1934
1862	O	(Scotland) Old Tom Morris (2/4)	tournament started in 1895	tournament started in 1916	tournament started in 1934
1863	O	(Scotland) Willie Park Sr. (2/4)	tournament started in 1895	tournament started in 1916	tournament started in 1934
1864	O	(Scotland) Old Tom Morris (3/4)	tournament started in 1895	tournament started in 1916	tournament started in 1934
1865	O	(Scotland) Andrew Strath (1/1)	tournament started in 1895	tournament started in 1916	tournament started in 1934
1866	O	(Scotland) Willie Park Sr. (3/4)	tournament started in 1895	tournament started in 1916	tournament started in 1934
1867	O	(Scotland) Old Tom Morris (4/4)	tournament started in 1895	tournament started in 1916	tournament started in 1934
1868	O	(Scotland) Young Tom Morris (1/4)	tournament started in 1895	tournament started in 1916	tournament started in 1934
1869	O	(Scotland) Young Tom Morris (2/4)	tournament started in 1895	tournament started in 1916	tournament started in 1934
1870	O	(Scotland) Young Tom Morris (3/4)	tournament started in 1895	tournament started in 1916	tournament started in 1934
1871	–	Not held; no trophy available	tournament started in 1895	tournament started in 1916	tournament started in 1934
1872	O	(Scotland) Young Tom Morris (4/4)	tournament started in 1895	tournament started in 1916	tournament started in 1934
1873	O	(Scotland) Tom Kidd (1/1)	tournament started in 1895	tournament started in 1916	tournament started in 1934
1874	O	(Scotland) Mungo Park (1/1)	tournament started in 1895	tournament started in 1916	tournament started in 1934
1875	O	(Scotland) Willie Park Sr. (4/4)	tournament started in 1895	tournament started in 1916	tournament started in 1934
1876	O	(Scotland) Bob Martin (1/2)	tournament started in 1895	tournament started in 1916	tournament started in 1934
1877	O	(Scotland) Jamie Anderson (1/3)	tournament started in 1895	tournament started in 1916	tournament started in 1934
1878	O	(Scotland) Jamie Anderson (2/3)	tournament started in 1895	tournament started in 1916	tournament started in 1934
1879	O	(Scotland) Jamie Anderson (3/3)	tournament started in 1895	tournament started in 1916	tournament started in 1934
1880	O	(Scotland) Bob Ferguson (1/3)	tournament started in 1895	tournament started in 1916	tournament started in 1934
1881	O	(Scotland) Bob Ferguson (2/3)	tournament started in 1895	tournament started in 1916	tournament started in 1934
1882	O	(Scotland) Bob Ferguson (3/3)	tournament started in 1895	tournament started in 1916	tournament started in 1934
1883	O	(Scotland) Willie Fernie (1/1)	tournament started in 1895	tournament started in 1916	tournament started in 1934
1884	O	(Scotland) Jack Simpson (1/1)	tournament started in 1895	tournament started in 1916	tournament started in 1934
1885	O	(Scotland) Bob Martin (2/2)	tournament started in 1895	tournament started in 1916	tournament started in 1934
1886	O	(Scotland) David Brown (1/1)	tournament started in 1895	tournament started in 1916	tournament started in 1934
1887	O	(Scotland) Willie Park Jr. (1/2)	tournament started in 1895	tournament started in 1916	tournament started in 1934
1888	O	(Scotland) Jack Burns (1/1)	tournament started in 1895	tournament started in 1916	tournament started in 1934
1889	O	(Scotland) Willie Park Jr. (2/2)	tournament started in 1895	tournament started in 1916	tournament started in 1934
1890	O	(England) John Ball, Jnr (1/1)	tournament started in 1895	tournament started in 1916	tournament started in 1934
1891	O	(Scotland) Hugh Kirkaldy (1/1)	tournament started in 1895	tournament started in 1916	tournament started in 1934
1892	O	(England) Harold Hilton (1/2)	tournament started in 1895	tournament started in 1916	tournament started in 1934
1893	O	(Scotland) Willie Auchterlonie (1/1)	tournament started in 1895	tournament started in 1916	tournament started in 1934
1894	O	(England) John Henry Taylor (1/5)	tournament started in 1895	tournament started in 1916	tournament started in 1934
1895	OU	(England) John Henry Taylor (2/5)	(England) Horace Rawlins (1/1)	tournament started in 1916	tournament started in 1934
1896	OU	(Jersey) Harry Vardon (1/7)	(Scotland) James Foulis (1/1)	tournament started in 1916	tournament started in 1934
1897	OU	(England) Harold Hilton (2/2)	(England) Joe Lloyd (1/1)	tournament started in 1916	tournament started in 1934
1898	OU	(Jersey) Harry Vardon (2/7)	(Scotland) Fred Herd (1/1)	tournament started in 1916	tournament started in 1934
1899	OU	(Jersey) Harry Vardon (3/7)	(Scotland) Willie Smith (1/1)	tournament started in 1916	tournament started in 1934
1900	OU	(England) John Henry Taylor (3/5)	(Jersey) Harry Vardon (4/7)	tournament started in 1916	tournament started in 1934
1901	OU	(Scotland) James Braid (1/5)	(Scotland) Willie Anderson (1/4)	tournament started in 1916	tournament started in 1934
1902	OU	(Scotland) Sandy Herd (1/1)	(Scotland) Laurie Auchterlonie (1/1)	tournament started in 1916	tournament started in 1934
1903	OU	(Jersey) Harry Vardon (5/7)	(Scotland) Willie Anderson (2/4)	tournament started in 1916	tournament started in 1934
1904	OU	(Scotland) Jack White (1/1)	(Scotland) Willie Anderson (3/4)	tournament started in 1916	tournament started in 1934
1905	OU	(Scotland) James Braid (2/5)	(Scotland) Willie Anderson (4/4)	tournament started in 1916	tournament started in 1934
1906	OU	(Scotland) James Braid (3/5)	(Scotland) Alex Smith (1/2)	tournament started in 1916	tournament started in 1934
1907	OU	(France) Arnaud Massy (1/1)	(Scotland) Alec Ross (1/1)	tournament started in 1916	tournament started in 1934
1908	OU	(Scotland) James Braid (4/5)	(Scotland) Fred McLeod (1/1)	tournament started in 1916	tournament started in 1934
1909	OU	(England) John Henry Taylor (4/5)	(England) George Sargent (1/1)	tournament started in 1916	tournament started in 1934
1910	UO	(Scotland) James Braid (5/5)	(Scotland) Alex Smith (2/2)	tournament started in 1916	tournament started in 1934
1911	UO	(Jersey) Harry Vardon (6/7)	(United States) John McDermott (1/2)	tournament started in 1916	tournament started in 1934
1912	OU	(Jersey) Ted Ray (1/2)	(United States) John McDermott (2/2)	tournament started in 1916	tournament started in 1934
1913	OU	(England) John Henry Taylor (5/5)	(United States) Francis Ouimet (1/1)	tournament started in 1916	tournament started in 1934
1914	OU	(Jersey) Harry Vardon (7/7)	(United States) Walter Hagen (1/11)	tournament started in 1916	tournament started in 1934
1915	U	Not held due to World War I	(United States) Jerome Travers (1/1)	tournament started in 1916	tournament started in 1934
1916	UP	Not held due to World War I	(United States) Chick Evans (1/1)	(England) Jim Barnes (1/4)	tournament started in 1934
1917	–	Not held due to World War I	Not held due to World War I	Not held due to World War I	tournament started in 1934
1918	–	Not held due to World War I	Not held due to World War I	Not held due to World War I	tournament started in 1934
1919	UP	Not held due to World War I	(United States) Walter Hagen (2/11)	(England) Jim Barnes (2/4)	tournament started in 1934
1920	OUP	(Scotland) George Duncan (1/1)	(Jersey) Ted Ray (2/2)	(Scotland) (United States) Jock Hutchison (1/2) (Note: Jock Hutchison was born in Scotland, however on April 1, 1920 he was naturalized as U.S. citizen. His 2 majors are counted to U.S. regarding the 'wins and champions per nationality' accumulation.)	tournament started in 1934
1921	OUP	(Scotland) (United States) Jock Hutchison (2/2)	(England) Jim Barnes (3/4)	(United States) Walter Hagen (3/11)	tournament started in 1934
1922	OUP	(United States) Walter Hagen (4/11)	(United States) Gene Sarazen (1/7)	(United States) Gene Sarazen (2/7)	tournament started in 1934
1923	OUP	(England) Arthur Havers (1/1)	(United States) Bobby Jones (1/7)	(United States) Gene Sarazen (3/7)	tournament started in 1934
1924	UOP	(United States) Walter Hagen (5/11)	(England) Cyril Walker (1/1)	(United States) Walter Hagen (6/11)	tournament started in 1934
1925	UOP	(England) Jim Barnes (4/4)	(Scotland) Willie MacFarlane (1/1)	(United States) Walter Hagen (7/11)	tournament started in 1934
1926	OUP	(United States) Bobby Jones (2/7)	(United States) Bobby Jones (3/7)	(United States) Walter Hagen (8/11)	tournament started in 1934
1927	UOP	(United States) Bobby Jones (4/7)	(Scotland) (United States) Tommy Armour (1/3) (Note: Tommy Armour was born in Scotland and became U.S. citizen thus his wins are listed under the U.S..)	(United States) Walter Hagen (9/11)	tournament started in 1934
1928	OUP	(United States) Walter Hagen (10/11)	(United States) Johnny Farrell (1/1)	(United States) Leo Diegel (1/2)	tournament started in 1934
1929	OUP	(United States) Walter Hagen (11/11)	(United States) Bobby Jones (5/7)	(United States) Leo Diegel (2/2)	tournament started in 1934
1930	OUP	(United States) Bobby Jones (6/7)	(United States) Bobby Jones (7/7)	(Scotland) (United States) Tommy Armour (2/3)	tournament started in 1934
1931	OUP	(Scotland) (United States) Tommy Armour (3/3)	(United States) Billy Burke (1/1)	(United States) Tom Creavy (1/1)	tournament started in 1934
1932	OUP	(United States) Gene Sarazen (4/7)	(United States) Gene Sarazen (5/7)	(United States) Olin Dutra (1/2)	tournament started in 1934
1933	UOP	(United States) Denny Shute (1/3)	(United States) Johnny Goodman (1/1)	(United States) Gene Sarazen (6/7)	tournament started in 1934
1934	MUOP	(England) Henry Cotton (1/3)	(United States) Olin Dutra (2/2)	(United States) Paul Runyan (1/2)	(United States) Horton Smith (1/2)
1935	MUOP	(England) Alf Perry (1/1)	(United States) Sam Parks Jr. (1/1)	(United States) Johnny Revolta (1/1)	(United States) Gene Sarazen (7/7)
1936	MUOP	(England) Alf Padgham (1/1)	(United States) Tony Manero (1/1)	(United States) Denny Shute (2/3)	(United States) Horton Smith (2/2)
1937	MPUO	(England) Henry Cotton (2/3)	(United States) Ralph Guldahl (1/3)	(United States) Denny Shute (3/3)	(United States) Byron Nelson (1/5)
1938	MUOP	(England) Reg Whitcombe (1/1)	(United States) Ralph Guldahl (2/3)	(United States) Paul Runyan (2/2)	(United States) Henry Picard (1/2)
1939	MUOP	(England) Dick Burton (1/1)	(United States) Byron Nelson (2/5)	(United States) Henry Picard (2/2)	(United States) Ralph Guldahl (3/3)
1940	MUP	Not held due to World War II	(United States) Lawson Little (1/1)	(United States) Byron Nelson (3/5)	(United States) Jimmy Demaret (1/3)
1941	MUP	Not held due to World War II	(United States) Craig Wood (2/2)	(United States) Vic Ghezzi (1/1)	(United States) Craig Wood (1/2)
1942	MP	Not held due to World War II	Not held due to World War II	(United States) Sam Snead (1/7)	(United States) Byron Nelson (4/5)
1943	–	Not held due to World War II	Not held due to World War II	Not held due to World War II	Not held due to World War II
1944	P	Not held due to World War II	Not held due to World War II	(United States) Bob Hamilton (1/1)	Not held due to World War II
1945	P	Not held due to World War II	Not held due to World War II	(United States) Byron Nelson (5/5)	Not held due to World War II
1946	MUOP	(United States) Sam Snead (2/7)	(United States) Lloyd Mangrum (1/1)	(United States) Ben Hogan (1/9)	(United States) Herman Keiser (1/1)
1947	MUPO	(Northern Ireland) Fred Daly (1/1)	(United States) Lew Worsham (1/1)	(Australia) Jim Ferrier (1/1)	(United States) Jimmy Demaret (2/3)
1948	MPUO	(England) Henry Cotton (3/3)	(United States) Ben Hogan (3/9)	(United States) Ben Hogan (2/9)	(United States) Claude Harmon (1/1)
1949	MPUO	(South Africa) Bobby Locke (1/4)	(United States) Cary Middlecoff (1/3)	(United States) Sam Snead (4/7)	(United States) Sam Snead (3/7)
1950	MUPO	(South Africa) Bobby Locke (2/4)	(United States) Ben Hogan (4/9)	(United States) Chandler Harper (1/1)	(United States) Jimmy Demaret (3/3)
1951	MUPO	(England) Max Faulkner (1/1)	(United States) Ben Hogan (6/9)	(United States) Sam Snead (5/7)	(United States) Ben Hogan (5/9)
1952	MUPO	(South Africa) Bobby Locke (3/4)	(United States) Julius Boros (1/3)	(United States) Jim Turnesa (1/1)	(United States) Sam Snead (6/7)
1953	MUPO	(United States) Ben Hogan (9/9)	(United States) Ben Hogan (8/9)	(United States) Walter Burkemo (1/1)	(United States) Ben Hogan (7/9)
1954	MUOP	(Australia) Peter Thomson (1/5)	(United States) Ed Furgol (1/1)	(United States) Chick Harbert (1/1)	(United States) Sam Snead (7/7)
1955	MUOP	(Australia) Peter Thomson (2/5)	(United States) Jack Fleck (1/1)	(United States) Doug Ford (1/2)	(United States) Cary Middlecoff (2/3)
1956	MUOP	(Australia) Peter Thomson (3/5)	(United States) Cary Middlecoff (3/3)	(United States) Jack Burke Jr. (2/2)	(United States) Jack Burke Jr. (1/2)
1957	MUOP	(South Africa) Bobby Locke (4/4)	(United States) Dick Mayer (1/1)	(United States) Lionel Hebert (1/1)	(United States) Doug Ford (2/2)
1958	MUOP	(Australia) Peter Thomson (4/5)	(United States) Tommy Bolt (1/1)	(United States) Dow Finsterwald (1/1)	(United States) Arnold Palmer (1/7)
1959	MUOP	(South Africa) Gary Player (1/9)	(United States) Billy Casper (1/3)	(United States) Bob Rosburg (1/1)	(United States) Art Wall Jr. (1/1)
1960	MUOP	(Australia) Kel Nagle (1/1)	(United States) Arnold Palmer (3/7)	(United States) Jay Hebert (1/1)	(United States) Arnold Palmer (2/7)
1961	MUOP	(United States) Arnold Palmer (4/7)	(United States) Gene Littler (1/1)	(United States) Jerry Barber (1/1)	(South Africa) Gary Player (2/9)
1962	MUOP	(United States) Arnold Palmer (6/7)	(United States) Jack Nicklaus (1/18)	(South Africa) Gary Player (3/9)	(United States) Arnold Palmer (5/7)
1963	MUOP	(New Zealand) Bob Charles (1/1)	(United States) Julius Boros (2/3)	(United States) Jack Nicklaus (3/18)	(United States) Jack Nicklaus (2/18)
1964	MUOP	(United States) Tony Lema (1/1)	(United States) Ken Venturi (1/1)	(United States) Bobby Nichols (1/1)	(United States) Arnold Palmer (7/7)
1965	MUOP	(Australia) Peter Thomson (5/5)	(South Africa) Gary Player (4/9)	(United States) Dave Marr (1/1)	(United States) Jack Nicklaus (4/18)
1966	MUOP	(United States) Jack Nicklaus (6/18)	(United States) Billy Casper (2/3)	(United States) Al Geiberger (1/1)	(United States) Jack Nicklaus (5/18)
1967	MUOP	(Argentina) Roberto De Vicenzo (1/1)	(United States) Jack Nicklaus (7/18)	(United States) Don January (1/1)	(United States) Gay Brewer (1/1)
1968	MUOP	(South Africa) Gary Player (5/9)	(United States) Lee Trevino (1/6)	(United States) Julius Boros (3/3)	(United States) Bob Goalby (1/1)
1969	MUOP	(England) Tony Jacklin (1/2)	(United States) Orville Moody (1/1)	(United States) Raymond Floyd (1/4)	(United States) George Archer (1/1)
1970	MUOP	(United States) Jack Nicklaus (8/18)	(England) Tony Jacklin (2/2)	(United States) Dave Stockton (1/2)	(United States) Billy Casper (3/3)
1971	PMUO	(United States) Lee Trevino (3/6)	(United States) Lee Trevino (2/6)	(United States) Jack Nicklaus (9/18)	(United States) Charles Coody (1/1)
1972	MUOP	(United States) Lee Trevino (4/6)	(United States) Jack Nicklaus (11/18)	(South Africa) Gary Player (6/9)	(United States) Jack Nicklaus (10/18)
1973	MUOP	(United States) Tom Weiskopf (1/1)	(United States) Johnny Miller (1/2)	(United States) Jack Nicklaus (12/18)	(United States) Tommy Aaron (1/1)
1974	MUOP	(South Africa) Gary Player (8/9)	(United States) Hale Irwin (1/3)	(United States) Lee Trevino (5/6)	(South Africa) Gary Player (7/9)
1975	MUOP	(United States) Tom Watson (1/8)	(United States) Lou Graham (1/1)	(United States) Jack Nicklaus (14/18)	(United States) Jack Nicklaus (13/18)
1976	MUOP	(United States) Johnny Miller (2/2)	(United States) Jerry Pate (1/1)	(United States) Dave Stockton (2/2)	(United States) Raymond Floyd (2/4)
1977	MUOP	(United States) Tom Watson (3/8)	(United States) Hubert Green (1/2)	(United States) Lanny Wadkins (1/1)	(United States) Tom Watson (2/8)
1978	MUOP	(United States) Jack Nicklaus (15/18)	(United States) Andy North (1/2)	(United States) John Mahaffey (1/1)	(South Africa) Gary Player (9/9)
1979	MUOP	(Spain) Seve Ballesteros (1/5)	(United States) Hale Irwin (2/3)	(Australia) David Graham (1/2)	(United States) Fuzzy Zoeller (1/2)
1980	MUOP	(United States) Tom Watson (4/8)	(United States) Jack Nicklaus (16/18)	(United States) Jack Nicklaus (17/18)	(Spain) Seve Ballesteros (2/5)
1981	MUOP	(United States) Bill Rogers (1/1)	(Australia) David Graham (2/2)	(United States) Larry Nelson (1/3)	(United States) Tom Watson (5/8)
1982	MUOP	(United States) Tom Watson (7/8)	(United States) Tom Watson (6/8)	(United States) Raymond Floyd (3/4)	(United States) Craig Stadler (1/1)
1983	MUOP	(United States) Tom Watson (8/8)	(United States) Larry Nelson (2/3)	(United States) Hal Sutton (1/1)	(Spain) Seve Ballesteros (3/5)
1984	MUOP	(Spain) Seve Ballesteros (4/5)	(United States) Fuzzy Zoeller (2/2)	(United States) Lee Trevino (6/6)	(United States) Ben Crenshaw (1/2)
1985	MUOP	(Scotland) Sandy Lyle (1/2)	(United States) Andy North (2/2)	(United States) Hubert Green (2/2)	(West Germany) Bernhard Langer (1/2)
1986	MUOP	(Australia) Greg Norman (1/2)	(United States) Raymond Floyd (4/4)	(United States) Bob Tway (1/1)	(United States) Jack Nicklaus (18/18)
1987	MUOP	(England) Nick Faldo (1/6)	(United States) Scott Simpson (1/1)	(United States) Larry Nelson (3/3)	(United States) Larry Mize (1/1)
1988	MUOP	(Spain) Seve Ballesteros (5/5)	(United States) Curtis Strange (1/2)	(United States) Jeff Sluman (1/1)	(Scotland) Sandy Lyle (2/2)
1989	MUOP	(United States) Mark Calcavecchia (1/1)	(United States) Curtis Strange (2/2)	(United States) Payne Stewart (1/3)	(England) Nick Faldo (2/6)
1990	MUOP	(England) Nick Faldo (4/6)	(United States) Hale Irwin (3/3)	(Australia) Wayne Grady (1/1)	(England) Nick Faldo (3/6)
1991	MUOP	(Australia) Ian Baker-Finch (1/1)	(United States) Payne Stewart (2/3)	(United States) John Daly (1/2)	(Wales) Ian Woosnam (1/1)
1992	MUOP	(England) Nick Faldo (5/6)	(United States) Tom Kite (1/1)	(Zimbabwe) Nick Price (1/3)	(United States) Fred Couples (1/1)
1993	MUOP	(Australia) Greg Norman (2/2)	(United States) Lee Janzen (1/2)	(United States) Paul Azinger (1/1)	(Germany) Bernhard Langer (2/2)
1994	MUOP	(Zimbabwe) Nick Price (2/3)	(South Africa) Ernie Els (1/4)	(Zimbabwe) Nick Price (3/3)	(Spain) José María Olazábal (1/2)
1995	MUOP	(United States) John Daly (2/2)	(United States) Corey Pavin (1/1)	(Australia) Steve Elkington (1/1)	(United States) Ben Crenshaw (2/2)
1996	MUOP	(United States) Tom Lehman (1/1)	(United States) Steve Jones (1/1)	(United States) Mark Brooks (1/1)	(England) Nick Faldo (6/6)
1997	MUOP	(United States) Justin Leonard (1/1)	(South Africa) Ernie Els (2/4)	(United States) Davis Love III (1/1)	(United States) Tiger Woods (1/15)
1998	MUOP	(United States) Mark O'Meara (2/2)	(United States) Lee Janzen (2/2)	(Fiji) Vijay Singh (1/3)	(United States) Mark O'Meara (1/2)
1999	MUOP	(Scotland) Paul Lawrie (1/1)	(United States) Payne Stewart (3/3)	(United States) Tiger Woods (2/15)	(Spain) José María Olazábal (2/2)
2000	MUOP	(United States) Tiger Woods (4/15)	(United States) Tiger Woods (3/15)	(United States) Tiger Woods (5/15)	(Fiji) Vijay Singh (2/3)
2001	MUOP	(United States) David Duval (1/1)	(South Africa) Retief Goosen (1/2)	(United States) David Toms (1/1)	(United States) Tiger Woods (6/15)
2002	MUOP	(South Africa) Ernie Els (3/4)	(United States) Tiger Woods (8/15)	(United States) Rich Beem (1/1)	(United States) Tiger Woods (7/15)
2003	MUOP	(United States) Ben Curtis (1/1)	(United States) Jim Furyk (1/1)	(United States) Shaun Micheel (1/1)	(Canada) Mike Weir (1/1)
2004	MUOP	(United States) Todd Hamilton (1/1)	(South Africa) Retief Goosen (2/2)	(Fiji) Vijay Singh (3/3)	(United States) Phil Mickelson (1/6)
2005	MUOP	(United States) Tiger Woods (10/15)	(New Zealand) Michael Campbell (1/1)	(United States) Phil Mickelson (2/6)	(United States) Tiger Woods (9/15)
2006	MUOP	(United States) Tiger Woods (11/15)	(Australia) Geoff Ogilvy (1/1)	(United States) Tiger Woods (12/15)	(United States) Phil Mickelson (3/6)
2007	MUOP	(Republic of Ireland) Pádraig Harrington (1/3)	(Argentina) Ángel Cabrera (1/2)	(United States) Tiger Woods (13/15)	(United States) Zach Johnson (1/2)
2008	MUOP	(Republic of Ireland) Pádraig Harrington (2/3)	(United States) Tiger Woods (14/15)	(Republic of Ireland) Pádraig Harrington (3/3)	(South Africa) Trevor Immelman (1/1)
2009	MUOP	(United States) Stewart Cink (1/1)	(United States) Lucas Glover (1/1)	(South Korea) Yang Yong-eun (1/1)	(Argentina) Ángel Cabrera (2/2)
2010	MUOP	(South Africa) Louis Oosthuizen (1/1)	(Northern Ireland) Graeme McDowell (1/1)	(Germany) Martin Kaymer (1/2)	(United States) Phil Mickelson (4/6)
2011	MUOP	(Northern Ireland) Darren Clarke (1/1)	(Northern Ireland) Rory McIlroy (1/6)	(United States) Keegan Bradley (1/1)	(South Africa) Charl Schwartzel (1/1)
2012	MUOP	(South Africa) Ernie Els (4/4)	(United States) Webb Simpson (1/1)	(Northern Ireland) Rory McIlroy (2/6)	(United States) Bubba Watson (1/2)
2013	MUOP	(United States) Phil Mickelson (5/6)	(England) Justin Rose (1/1)	(United States) Jason Dufner (1/1)	(Australia) Adam Scott (1/1)
2014	MUOP	(Northern Ireland) Rory McIlroy (3/6)	(Germany) Martin Kaymer (2/2)	(Northern Ireland) Rory McIlroy (4/6)	(United States) Bubba Watson (2/2)
2015	MUOP	(United States) Zach Johnson (2/2)	(United States) Jordan Spieth (2/3)	(Australia) Jason Day (1/1)	(United States) Jordan Spieth (1/3)
2016	MUOP	(Sweden) Henrik Stenson (1/1)	(United States) Dustin Johnson (1/2)	(United States) Jimmy Walker (1/1)	(England) Danny Willett (1/1)
2017	MUOP	(United States) Jordan Spieth (3/3)	(United States) Brooks Koepka (1/5)	(United States) Justin Thomas (1/2)	(Spain) Sergio García (1/1)
2018	MUOP	(Italy) Francesco Molinari (1/1)	(United States) Brooks Koepka (2/5)	(United States) Brooks Koepka (3/5)	(United States) Patrick Reed (1/1)
2019	MPUO	(Republic of Ireland) Shane Lowry (1/1)	(United States) Gary Woodland (1/1)	(United States) Brooks Koepka (4/5)	(United States) Tiger Woods (15/15)
2020	PUM	Not held due to coronavirus pandemic	(United States) Bryson DeChambeau (1/2)	(United States) Collin Morikawa (1/2)	(United States) Dustin Johnson (2/2)
2021	MPUO	(United States) Collin Morikawa (2/2)	(Spain) Jon Rahm (1/2)	(United States) Phil Mickelson (6/6)	(Japan) Hideki Matsuyama (1/1)
2022	MPUO	(Australia) Cameron Smith (1/1)	(England) Matt Fitzpatrick (1/1)	(United States) Justin Thomas (2/2)	(United States) Scottie Scheffler (1/4)
2023	MPUO	(United States) Brian Harman (1/1)	(United States) Wyndham Clark (1/2)	(United States) Brooks Koepka (5/5)	(Spain) Jon Rahm (2/2)
2024	MPUO	(United States) Xander Schauffele (2/2)	(United States) Bryson DeChambeau (2/2)	(United States) Xander Schauffele (1/2)	(United States) Scottie Scheffler (2/4)
2025	MPUO	(United States) Scottie Scheffler (4/4)	(United States) J. J. Spaun (1/1)	(United States) Scottie Scheffler (3/4)	(Northern Ireland) Rory McIlroy (5/6)
2026	MPUO	(New Zealand) Ryan Fox (1/1)	(United States) Wyndham Clark (2/2)	(England) Aaron Rai (1/1)	(Northern Ireland) Rory McIlroy (6/6)

== By player ==
Players are listed here in order of their first win.

For much of the modern era the four major championships have been played chronologically in the order listed, but this has not always been the case, and starting in 2019 the PGA Championship was rescheduled as the second major of the year. In 2020, a year dramatically affected by COVID-19, The Open Championship was not held, and the Masters was held in November, after the other two majors.

		First major		Majors won					
No.	Country	Player	Year	Tournament	Total	Masters Tournament	U.S. Open	The Open Championship	PGA Championship
1	(Scotland)	Willie Park Sr.	1860	The Open Championship	4			1860, 1863, 1866, 1875	
2	(Scotland)	Old Tom Morris	1861	The Open Championship	4			1861, 1862, 1864, 1867	
3	(Scotland)	Andrew Strath	1865	The Open Championship	1			1865	
4	(Scotland)	Young Tom Morris	1868	The Open Championship	4			1868, 1869, 1870, 1872	
5	(Scotland)	Tom Kidd	1873	The Open Championship	1			1873	
6	(Scotland)	Mungo Park	1874	The Open Championship	1			1874	
7	(Scotland)	Bob Martin	1876	The Open Championship	2			1876, 1885	
8	(Scotland)	Jamie Anderson	1877	The Open Championship	3			1877, 1878, 1879	
9	(Scotland)	Bob Ferguson	1880	The Open Championship	3			1880, 1881, 1882	
10	(Scotland)	Willie Fernie	1883	The Open Championship	1			1883	
11	(Scotland)	Jack Simpson	1884	The Open Championship	1			1884	
12	(Scotland)	David Brown	1886	The Open Championship	1			1886	
13	(Scotland)	Willie Park Jr.	1887	The Open Championship	2			1887, 1889	
14	(Scotland)	Jack Burns	1888	The Open Championship	1			1888	
15	(England)	John Ball	1890	The Open Championship	1			1890	
16	(Scotland)	Hugh Kirkaldy	1891	The Open Championship	1			1891	
17	(England)	Harold Hilton	1892	The Open Championship	2			1892, 1897	
18	(Scotland)	William Auchterlonie	1893	The Open Championship	1			1893	
19	(England)	John Henry Taylor	1894	The Open Championship	5			1894, 1895, 1900, 1909, 1913	
20	(England)	Horace Rawlins	1895	U.S. Open	1		1895		
21	(Jersey)	Harry Vardon	1896	The Open Championship	7		1900	1896, 1898, 1899, 1903, 1911, 1914	
22	(Scotland)	James Foulis	1896	U.S. Open	1		1896		
23	(England)	Joe Lloyd	1897	U.S. Open	1		1897		
24	(Scotland)	Fred Herd	1898	U.S. Open	1		1898		
25	(Scotland)	Willie Smith	1899	U.S. Open	1		1899		
26	(Scotland)	James Braid	1901	The Open Championship	5			1901, 1905, 1906, 1908, 1910	
27	(Scotland)	Willie Anderson	1901	U.S. Open	4		1901, 1903, 1904, 1905		
28	(Scotland)	Sandy Herd	1902	The Open Championship	1			1902	
29	(Scotland)	Laurie Auchterlonie	1902	U.S. Open	1		1902		
30	(Scotland)	Jack White	1904	The Open Championship	1			1904	
31	(Scotland)	Alex Smith	1906	U.S. Open	2		1906, 1910		
32	(Scotland)	Alec Ross	1907	U.S. Open	1		1907		
33	(France)	Arnaud Massy	1907	The Open Championship	1			1907	
34	(Scotland)	Fred McLeod	1908	U.S. Open	1		1908		
35	(England)	George Sargent	1909	U.S. Open	1		1909		
36	(United States)	John McDermott	1911	U.S. Open	2		1911, 1912		
37	(Jersey)	Ted Ray	1912	The Open Championship	2		1920	1912	
38	(United States)	Francis Ouimet	1913	U.S. Open	1		1913		
39	(United States)	Walter Hagen	1914	U.S. Open	11		1914, 1919	1922, 1924, 1928, 1929	1921, 1924, 1925, 1926, 1927
40	(United States)	Jerome Travers	1915	U.S. Open	1		1915		
41	(United States)	Chick Evans	1916	U.S. Open	1		1916		
42	(England)	Jim Barnes	1916	PGA Championship	4		1921	1925	1916, 1919
43	(Scotland)	George Duncan	1920	The Open Championship	1			1920	
44	(United States)	Jock Hutchison	1920	PGA Championship	2			1921	1920
45	(United States)	Gene Sarazen	1922	U.S. Open	7	1935	1922, 1932	1932	1922, 1923, 1933
46	(England)	Arthur Havers	1923	The Open Championship	1			1923	
47	(United States)	Bobby Jones	1923	U.S. Open	7		1923, 1926, 1929, 1930	1926, 1927, 1930	
48	(England)	Cyril Walker	1924	U.S. Open	1		1924		
49	(Scotland)	Willie Macfarlane	1925	U.S. Open	1		1925		
50	(United States)	Tommy Armour	1927	U.S. Open	3		1927	1931	1930
51	(United States)	Johnny Farrell	1928	U.S. Open	1		1928		
52	(United States)	Leo Diegel	1928	PGA Championship	2				1928, 1929
53	(United States)	Billy Burke	1931	U.S. Open	1		1931		
54	(United States)	Tom Creavy	1931	PGA Championship	1				1931
55	(United States)	Olin Dutra	1932	PGA Championship	2		1934		1932
56	(United States)	Johnny Goodman	1933	U.S. Open	1		1933		
57	(United States)	Denny Shute	1933	The Open Championship	3			1933	1936, 1937
58	(United States)	Horton Smith	1934	Masters Tournament	2	1934, 1936			
59	(England)	Henry Cotton	1934	The Open Championship	3			1934, 1937, 1948	
60	(United States)	Paul Runyan	1934	PGA Championship	2				1934, 1938
61	(United States)	Sam Parks, Jr.	1935	U.S. Open	1		1935		
62	(England)	Alf Perry	1935	The Open Championship	1			1935	
63	(United States)	Johnny Revolta	1935	PGA Championship	1				1935
64	(United States)	Tony Manero	1936	U.S. Open	1		1936		
65	(England)	Alf Padgham	1936	The Open Championship	1			1936	
66	(United States)	Byron Nelson	1937	Masters Tournament	5	1937, 1942	1939		1940, 1945
67	(United States)	Ralph Guldahl	1937	U.S. Open	3	1939	1937, 1938		
68	(United States)	Henry Picard	1938	Masters Tournament	2	1938			1939
69	(England)	Reg Whitcombe	1938	The Open Championship	1			1938	
70	(England)	Dick Burton	1939	The Open Championship	1			1939	
71	(United States)	Jimmy Demaret	1940	Masters Tournament	3	1940, 1947, 1950			
72	(United States)	Lawson Little	1940	U.S. Open	1		1940		
73	(United States)	Craig Wood	1941	Masters Tournament	2	1941	1941		
74	(United States)	Vic Ghezzi	1941	PGA Championship	1				1941
75	(United States)	Sam Snead	1942	PGA Championship	7	1949, 1952, 1954		1946	1942, 1949, 1951
76	(United States)	Bob Hamilton	1944	PGA Championship	1				1944
77	(United States)	Herman Keiser	1946	Masters Tournament	1	1946			
78	(United States)	Lloyd Mangrum	1946	U.S. Open	1		1946		
79	(United States)	Ben Hogan	1946	PGA Championship	9	1951, 1953	1948, 1950, 1951, 1953	1953	1946, 1948
80	(United States)	Lew Worsham	1947	U.S. Open	1		1947		
81	(United States)	Jim Ferrier	1947	PGA Championship	1				1947
82	(Northern Ireland)	Fred Daly	1947	The Open Championship	1			1947	
83	(United States)	Claude Harmon	1948	Masters Tournament	1	1948			
84	(United States)	Cary Middlecoff	1949	U.S. Open	3	1955	1949, 1956		
85	(South Africa)	Bobby Locke	1949	The Open Championship	4			1949, 1950, 1952, 1957	
86	(United States)	Chandler Harper	1950	PGA Championship	1				1950
87	(England)	Max Faulkner	1951	The Open Championship	1			1951	
88	(United States)	Julius Boros	1952	U.S. Open	3		1952, 1963		1968
89	(United States)	Jim Turnesa	1952	PGA Championship	1				1952
90	(United States)	Walter Burkemo	1953	PGA Championship	1				1953
91	(United States)	Ed Furgol	1954	U.S. Open	1		1954		
92	(Australia)	Peter Thomson	1954	The Open Championship	5			1954, 1955, 1956, 1958, 1965	
93	(United States)	Chick Harbert	1954	PGA Championship	1				1954
94	(United States)	Jack Fleck	1955	U.S. Open	1		1955		
95	(United States)	Doug Ford	1955	PGA Championship	2	1957			1955
96	(United States)	Jack Burke Jr.	1956	Masters Tournament	2	1956			1956
97	(United States)	Dick Mayer	1957	U.S. Open	1		1957		
98	(United States)	Lionel Hebert	1957	PGA Championship	1				1957
99	(United States)	Arnold Palmer	1958	Masters Tournament	7	1958, 1960, 1962, 1964	1960	1961, 1962	
100	(United States)	Tommy Bolt	1958	U.S. Open	1		1958		
101	(United States)	Dow Finsterwald	1958	PGA Championship	1				1958
102	(United States)	Art Wall, Jr.	1959	Masters Tournament	1	1959			
103	(United States)	Billy Casper	1959	U.S. Open	3	1970	1959, 1966		
104	(South Africa)	Gary Player	1959	The Open Championship	9	1961, 1974, 1978	1965	1959, 1968, 1974	1962, 1972
105	(United States)	Bob Rosburg	1959	PGA Championship	1				1959
106	(Australia)	Kel Nagle	1960	The Open Championship	1			1960	
107	(United States)	Jay Hebert	1960	PGA Championship	1				1960
108	(United States)	Gene Littler	1961	U.S. Open	1		1961		
109	(United States)	Jerry Barber	1961	PGA Championship	1				1961
110	(United States)	Jack Nicklaus	1962	U.S. Open	18	1963, 1965, 1966, 1972, 1975, 1986	1962, 1967, 1972, 1980	1966, 1970, 1978	1963, 1971, 1973, 1975, 1980
111	(New Zealand)	Bob Charles	1963	The Open Championship	1			1963	
112	(United States)	Ken Venturi	1964	U.S. Open	1		1964		
113	(United States)	Tony Lema	1964	The Open Championship	1			1964	
114	(United States)	Bobby Nichols	1964	PGA Championship	1				1964
115	(United States)	Dave Marr	1965	PGA Championship	1				1965
116	(United States)	Al Geiberger	1966	PGA Championship	1				1966
117	(United States)	Gay Brewer	1967	Masters Tournament	1	1967			
118	(Argentina)	Roberto De Vicenzo	1967	The Open Championship	1			1967	
119	(United States)	Don January	1967	PGA Championship	1				1967
120	(United States)	Bob Goalby	1968	Masters Tournament	1	1968			
121	(United States)	Lee Trevino	1968	U.S. Open	6		1968, 1971	1971, 1972	1974, 1984
122	(United States)	George Archer	1969	Masters Tournament	1	1969			
123	(United States)	Orville Moody	1969	U.S. Open	1		1969		
124	(England)	Tony Jacklin	1969	The Open Championship	2		1970	1969	
125	(United States)	Raymond Floyd	1969	PGA Championship	4	1976	1986		1969, 1982
126	(United States)	Dave Stockton	1970	PGA Championship	2				1970, 1976
127	(United States)	Charles Coody	1971	Masters Tournament	1	1971			
128	(United States)	Tommy Aaron	1973	Masters Tournament	1	1973			
129	(United States)	Johnny Miller	1973	U.S. Open	2		1973	1976	
130	(United States)	Tom Weiskopf	1973	The Open Championship	1			1973	
131	(United States)	Hale Irwin	1974	U.S. Open	3		1974, 1979, 1990		
132	(United States)	Lou Graham	1975	U.S. Open	1		1975		
133	(United States)	Tom Watson	1975	The Open Championship	8	1977, 1981	1982	1975, 1977, 1980, 1982, 1983	
134	(United States)	Jerry Pate	1976	U.S. Open	1		1976		
135	(United States)	Hubert Green	1977	U.S. Open	2		1977		1985
136	(United States)	Lanny Wadkins	1977	PGA Championship	1				1977
137	(United States)	Andy North	1978	U.S. Open	2		1978, 1985		
138	(United States)	John Mahaffey	1978	PGA Championship	1				1978
139	(United States)	Fuzzy Zoeller	1979	Masters Tournament	2	1979	1984		
140	(Spain)	Seve Ballesteros	1979	The Open Championship	5	1980, 1983		1979, 1984, 1988	
141	(Australia)	David Graham	1979	PGA Championship	2		1981		1979
142	(United States)	Bill Rogers	1981	The Open Championship	1			1981	
143	(United States)	Larry Nelson	1981	PGA Championship	3		1983		1981, 1987
144	(United States)	Craig Stadler	1982	Masters Tournament	1	1982			
145	(United States)	Hal Sutton	1983	PGA Championship	1				1983
146	(United States)	Ben Crenshaw	1984	Masters Tournament	2	1984, 1995			
147	(Germany)	Bernhard Langer	1985	Masters Tournament	2	1985, 1993			
148	(Scotland)	Sandy Lyle	1985	The Open Championship	2	1988		1985	
149	(Australia)	Greg Norman	1986	The Open Championship	2			1986, 1993	
150	(United States)	Bob Tway	1986	PGA Championship	1				1986
151	(United States)	Larry Mize	1987	Masters Tournament	1	1987			
152	(United States)	Scott Simpson	1987	U.S. Open	1		1987		
153	(England)	Nick Faldo	1987	The Open Championship	6	1989, 1990, 1996		1987, 1990, 1992	
154	(United States)	Curtis Strange	1988	U.S. Open	2		1988, 1989		
155	(United States)	Jeff Sluman	1988	PGA Championship	1				1988
156	(United States)	Mark Calcavecchia	1989	The Open Championship	1			1989	
157	(United States)	Payne Stewart	1989	PGA Championship	3		1991, 1999		1989
158	(Australia)	Wayne Grady	1990	PGA Championship	1				1990
159	(Wales)	Ian Woosnam	1991	Masters Tournament	1	1991			
160	(Australia)	Ian Baker-Finch	1991	The Open Championship	1			1991	
161	(United States)	John Daly	1991	PGA Championship	2			1995	1991
162	(United States)	Fred Couples	1992	Masters Tournament	1	1992			
163	(United States)	Tom Kite	1992	U.S. Open	1		1992		
164	(Zimbabwe)	Nick Price	1992	PGA Championship	3			1994	1992, 1994
165	(United States)	Lee Janzen	1993	U.S. Open	2		1993, 1998		
166	(United States)	Paul Azinger	1993	PGA Championship	1				1993
167	(Spain)	José María Olazábal	1994	Masters Tournament	2	1994, 1999			
168	(South Africa)	Ernie Els	1994	U.S. Open	4		1994, 1997	2002, 2012	
169	(United States)	Corey Pavin	1995	U.S. Open	1		1995		
170	(Australia)	Steve Elkington	1995	PGA Championship	1				1995
171	(United States)	Steve Jones	1996	U.S. Open	1		1996		
172	(United States)	Tom Lehman	1996	The Open Championship	1			1996	
173	(United States)	Mark Brooks	1996	PGA Championship	1				1996
174	(United States)	Tiger Woods	1997	Masters Tournament	15	1997, 2001, 2002, 2005, 2019	2000, 2002, 2008	2000, 2005, 2006	1999, 2000, 2006, 2007
175	(United States)	Justin Leonard	1997	The Open Championship	1			1997	
176	(United States)	Davis Love III	1997	PGA Championship	1				1997
177	(United States)	Mark O'Meara	1998	Masters Tournament	2	1998		1998	
178	(Fiji)	Vijay Singh	1998	PGA Championship	3	2000			1998, 2004
179	(Scotland)	Paul Lawrie	1999	The Open Championship	1			1999	
180	(South Africa)	Retief Goosen	2001	U.S. Open	2		2001, 2004		
181	(United States)	David Duval	2001	The Open Championship	1			2001	
182	(United States)	David Toms	2001	PGA Championship	1				2001
183	(United States)	Rich Beem	2002	PGA Championship	1				2002
184	(Canada)	Mike Weir	2003	Masters Tournament	1	2003			
185	(United States)	Jim Furyk	2003	U.S. Open	1		2003		
186	(United States)	Ben Curtis	2003	The Open Championship	1			2003	
187	(United States)	Shaun Micheel	2003	PGA Championship	1				2003
188	(United States)	Phil Mickelson	2004	Masters Tournament	6	2004, 2006, 2010		2013	2005, 2021
189	(United States)	Todd Hamilton	2004	The Open Championship	1			2004	
190	(New Zealand)	Michael Campbell	2005	U.S. Open	1		2005		
191	(Australia)	Geoff Ogilvy	2006	U.S. Open	1		2006		
192	(United States)	Zach Johnson	2007	Masters Tournament	2	2007		2015	
193	(Argentina)	Ángel Cabrera	2007	U.S. Open	2	2009	2007		
194	(Republic of Ireland)	Pádraig Harrington	2007	The Open Championship	3			2007, 2008	2008
195	(South Africa)	Trevor Immelman	2008	Masters Tournament	1	2008			
196	(United States)	Lucas Glover	2009	U.S. Open	1		2009		
197	(United States)	Stewart Cink	2009	The Open Championship	1			2009	
198	(South Korea)	Yang Yong-eun	2009	PGA Championship	1				2009
199	(Northern Ireland)	Graeme McDowell	2010	U.S. Open	1		2010		
200	(South Africa)	Louis Oosthuizen	2010	The Open Championship	1			2010	
201	(Germany)	Martin Kaymer	2010	PGA Championship	2		2014		2010
202	(South Africa)	Charl Schwartzel	2011	Masters Tournament	1	2011			
203	(Northern Ireland)	Rory McIlroy	2011	U.S. Open	6	2025, 2026	2011	2014	2012, 2014
204	(Northern Ireland)	Darren Clarke	2011	The Open Championship	1			2011	
205	(United States)	Keegan Bradley	2011	PGA Championship	1				2011
206	(United States)	Bubba Watson	2012	Masters Tournament	2	2012, 2014			
207	(United States)	Webb Simpson	2012	U.S. Open	1		2012		
208	(Australia)	Adam Scott	2013	Masters Tournament	1	2013			
209	(England)	Justin Rose	2013	U.S. Open	1		2013		
210	(United States)	Jason Dufner	2013	PGA Championship	1				2013
211	(United States)	Jordan Spieth	2015	Masters Tournament	3	2015	2015	2017	
212	(Australia)	Jason Day	2015	PGA Championship	1				2015
213	(England)	Danny Willett	2016	Masters Tournament	1	2016			
214	(United States)	Dustin Johnson	2016	U.S. Open	2	2020	2016		
215	(Sweden)	Henrik Stenson	2016	The Open Championship	1			2016	
216	(United States)	Jimmy Walker	2016	PGA Championship	1				2016
217	(Spain)	Sergio García	2017	Masters Tournament	1	2017			
218	(United States)	Brooks Koepka	2017	U.S. Open	5		2017, 2018		2018, 2019, 2023
219	(United States)	Justin Thomas	2017	PGA Championship	2				2017, 2022
220	(United States)	Patrick Reed	2018	Masters Tournament	1	2018			
221	(Italy)	Francesco Molinari	2018	The Open Championship	1			2018	
222	(United States)	Gary Woodland	2019	U.S. Open	1		2019		
223	(Republic of Ireland)	Shane Lowry	2019	The Open Championship	1			2019	
224	(United States)	Collin Morikawa	2020	PGA Championship	2			2021	2020
225	(United States)	Bryson DeChambeau	2020	U.S. Open	2		2020, 2024		
226	(Japan)	Hideki Matsuyama	2021	Masters Tournament	1	2021			
227	(Spain)	Jon Rahm	2021	U.S. Open	2	2023	2021		
228	(United States)	Scottie Scheffler	2022	Masters Tournament	4	2022, 2024		2025	2025
229	(England)	Matt Fitzpatrick	2022	U.S. Open	1		2022		
230	(Australia)	Cameron Smith	2022	The Open Championship	1			2022	
231	(United States)	Wyndham Clark	2023	U.S. Open	2		2023, 2026		
232	(United States)	Brian Harman	2023	The Open Championship	1			2023	
233	(United States)	Xander Schauffele	2024	PGA Championship	2			2024	2024
234	(United States)	J. J. Spaun	2025	U.S. Open	1		2025		
235	(England)	Aaron Rai	2026	PGA Championship	1				2026
236	(New Zealand)	Ryan Fox	2026	The Open Championship	1			2026	

== See also ==
- List of men's major championships winning golfers
- Chronological list of LPGA major golf champions
