= Union Grounds =

Baseball field in Brooklyn, New York

Coordinates: 40°42′14″N 73°57′10″W

Union Grounds in 1865

Union Grounds was a baseball park located in the Williamsburg section of Brooklyn, New York. The grounds opened in 1862, its inaugural match being played on May 15. It was the first baseball park enclosed entirely by a fence, thereby allowing proprietor William Cammeyer or his tenant to charge admission. This permitted paying customers to watch the games from benches in a stand while non-paying spectators could only watch from embankments outside the grounds.

== Overview ==
The ball grounds was built on a large block bounded by Harrison Avenue, Rutledge Street, Lynch Street, and Marcy Avenue (Marcy also bordered the Capitoline Grounds). A writer for the Brooklyn Eagle described the field in 1862:

"The buildings occupied last winter are left standing, used pretty much for the same purposes as them.[sic] Near these a long wooden shed has been erected, capable of accommodating several hundred persons, and benches provided for the convenience of the fair sex. ... Several acres more have been added to the enclosure, which is fenced in with a board fence six or seven feet in height. On the southeast corner a large and commodious club house has been erected, containing accommodations for three clubs. The field is now almost a perfect level, covering at least some six acres of ground, all of which is well drained, rolled, and in a few weeks will be in splendid condition. ... Several flagstaffs have been put up, from which floated the banners of the clubs o'er shadowed by the nations' ensign."

During its early years Union Grounds was the home field for several ballclubs, notably including the Eckford Club, 1862 and 1863 champions of the National Association of Base Ball Players. In 1868, the Mutual Club of New York moved in from Elysian Fields, Hoboken, New Jersey, long-time home of Manhattan clubs but never enclosed. The ballpark's entrance was on Rutledge Street, and a one-story building in right field, 350 feet away from home plate, was in play. The diamond was in the northeast portion of the block, off Harrison Avenue. The church seen in the background of various illustrations was St. Paul's Episcopal Church, which stood at the corner of Marcy and Penn. The church was completed in 1861 and was demolished around 1930.

After formation of the first professional league, the National Association of Professional Base Ball Players, Union Grounds was home to the Mutual Club from 1871 to 1876 (the only year as a member of the new National League), Eckford of Brooklyn of the National Association in 1872, and the Atlantic Club of Brooklyn of the National Association from 1873 to 1875. It served as home field for the "Hartford of Brooklyn" team during the 1877 National League season. Some clubs also occasionally staged single games on the grounds, including a season-ending "home" game for the Chicago White Stockings in October 1871, whose own home grounds had been destroyed by the Great Chicago Fire. On July 26, 1878, the final major league game was played on the grounds, with Providence defeating Milwaukee, 4–1. The grounds continued to host barnstorming major league clubs, amateur clubs and independent clubs through the 1882 season.

The park did not sit idle during the winter. Its field was flooded and served as the rink for an ice skating club. An unusual feature of the park was the presence of a pagoda in center field.

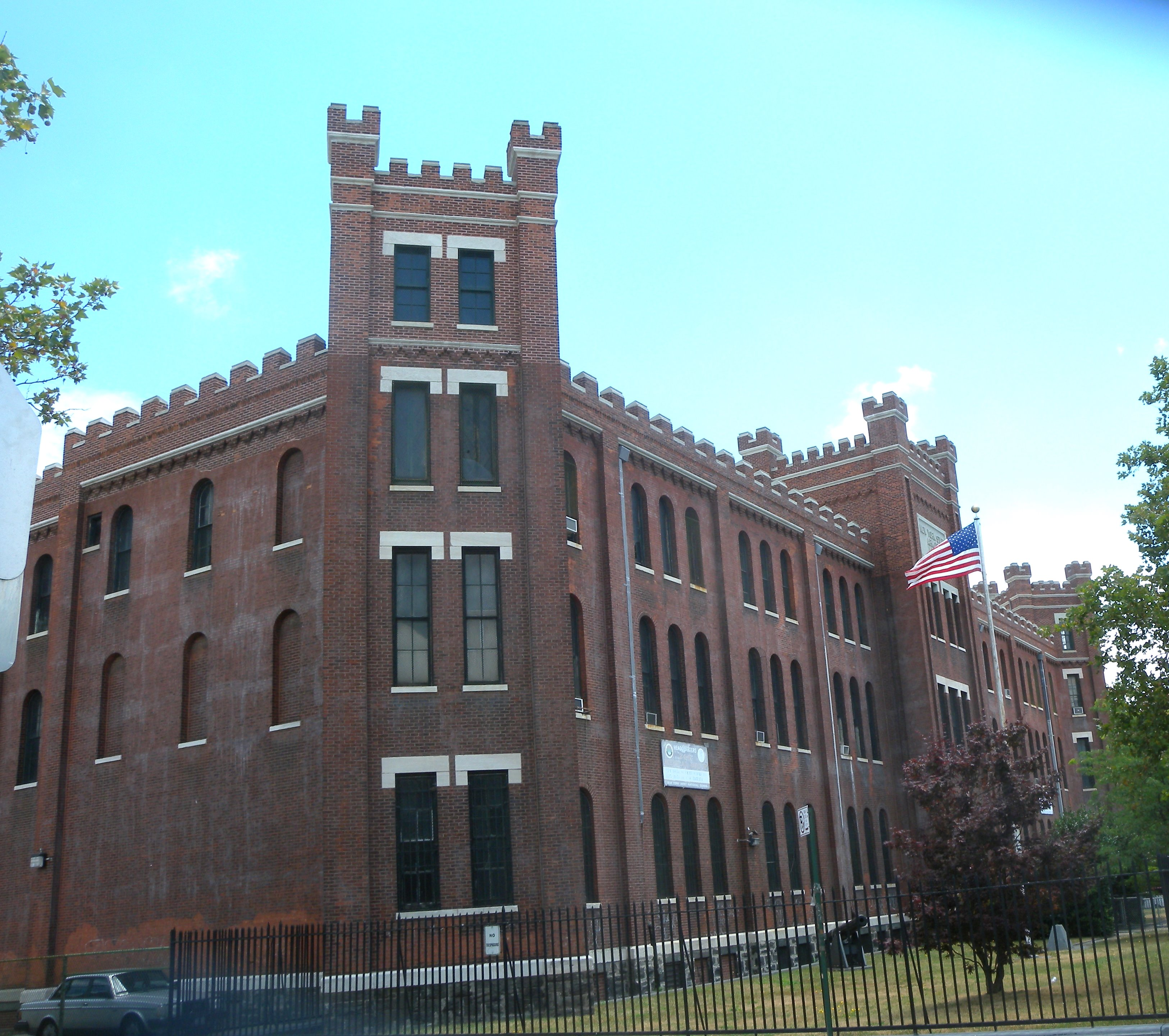
The Marcy Avenue Armory now occupies the southern half of the site of the Union Grounds.

Union Grounds was demolished in July of 1883. Heyward Street now runs through the site, and as of 2009 the Juan Morel Campos Secondary School stands to the north of Heyward Street and the Marcy Avenue Armory stands to the south of it, with no historical marker or any other indication of the land's significance to the history of baseball.

== Sources ==
- Green Cathedrals, by Philip J. Lowry, 1986.
- Ballparks of North America, by Michael Benson, 1989. Name: Union Grounds
- Long Before the Dodgers, by James L. Terry, 2002
