= 1865 in sports =

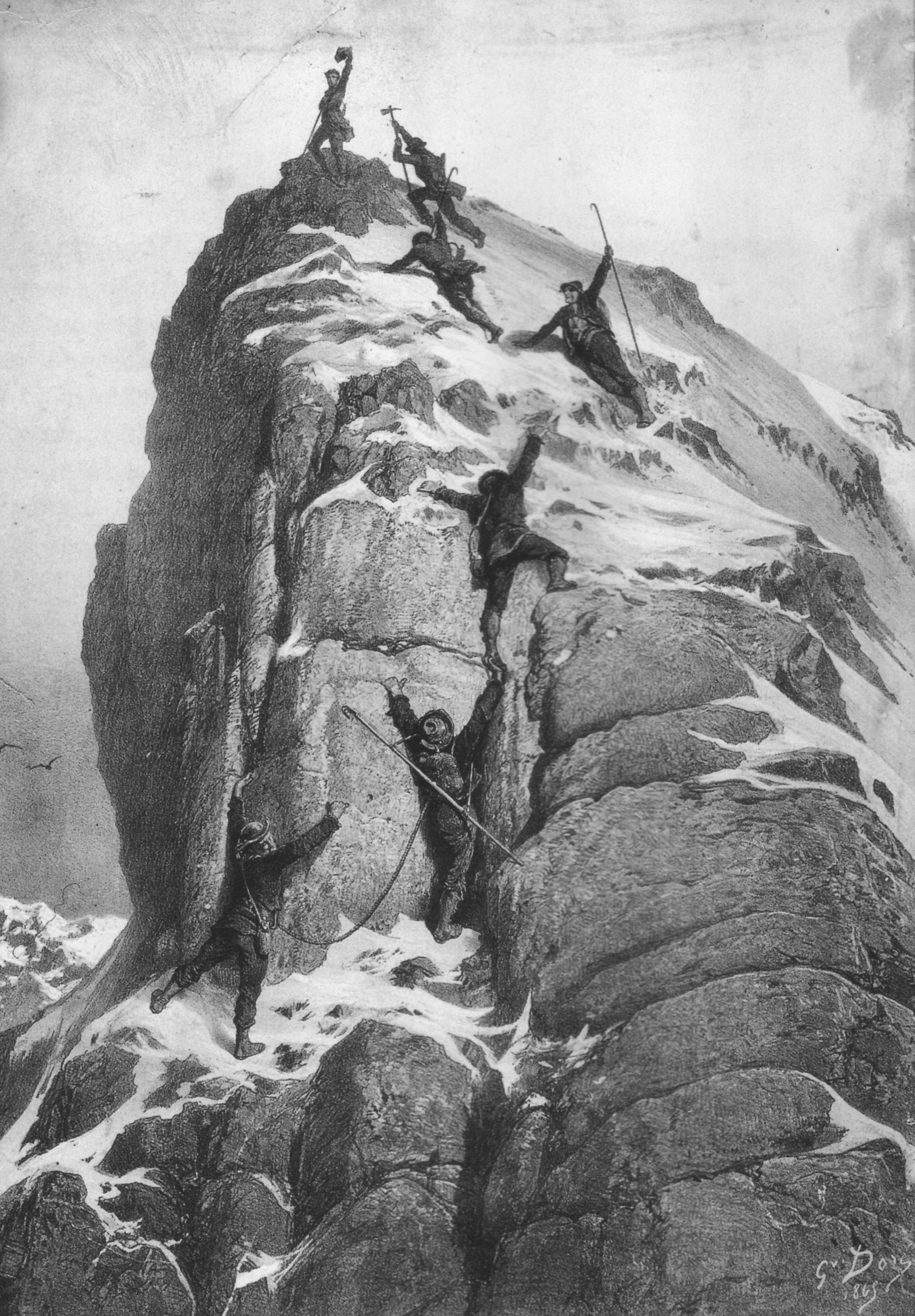
The first ascent of the Matterhorn by Gustave Doré

1865 in sports describes the year's events in world sport.

== Association football ==
Events

- Nottingham Forest, then called Forest FC, is founded in December by its parent hockey club. It is the third oldest club in the Football League after Notts County and Stoke City. Forest and Notts County play each other twice in the 1865–66 season so the Nottingham derby is the oldest fixture among teams playing in major association football leagues worldwide.

== Baseball ==
National championship

- National Association of Base Ball Players champion – Brooklyn Atlantics

Events

- The champion Atlantic club of Brooklyn, New York wins all 18 matches, a two-season run with one tie.
- In double contrast to the first war year 1861, National Association membership remains low but baseball-season travel and competition increase.

== Boxing ==
Events

- With Tom King having retired, the English Championship remains vacant.
- American Champion Joe Coburn refuses to fight his challengers and the title is claimed by Bill Davis, Mike McCoole and Jimmy Elliott.
- 2 November — Jimmy Elliott is about to fight Bill Davis at Point Pelee Island in Canada when police intervene and the event is cancelled; the title remains vacant with the same three claimants.

== Cricket ==
Events

- 15–16 February — earliest inter-colonial match in the West Indies is Barbados v. Demerara (now Guyana) at Bridgetown; recognised as the start of West Indian first-class cricket.
- 3 March — formation of Worcestershire County Cricket Club.
- 22 June — W. G. Grace, still only 16, makes his first-class debut playing for Gentlemen of the South v. Players of the South.
- Thomas Humphrey is the first batsman to score 1,000 runs in an English first-class season.

England

- Most runs – Thomas Humphrey 1,223 @ 29.82 (HS 106)
- Most wickets – James Lillywhite 87 @ 13.18 (BB 7–30)

== Golf ==
Major tournaments

- British Open – Andrew Strath

== Horse racing ==
England

- Grand National – Alcibiade
- 1,000 Guineas Stakes – Siberia
- 2,000 Guineas Stakes – Gladiateur
- The Derby – Gladiateur
- The Oaks – Regalia
- St. Leger Stakes – Gladiateur

Australia

- Melbourne Cup – Toryboy

Canada

- Queen's Plate – Lady Norfolk

== Rowing ==
The Boat Race

- 8 April — Oxford wins the 22nd Oxford and Cambridge Boat Race

== Rugby football ==
Events

- Foundation of Bath RFC and Hull F.C.
