= Sports in Brooklyn =

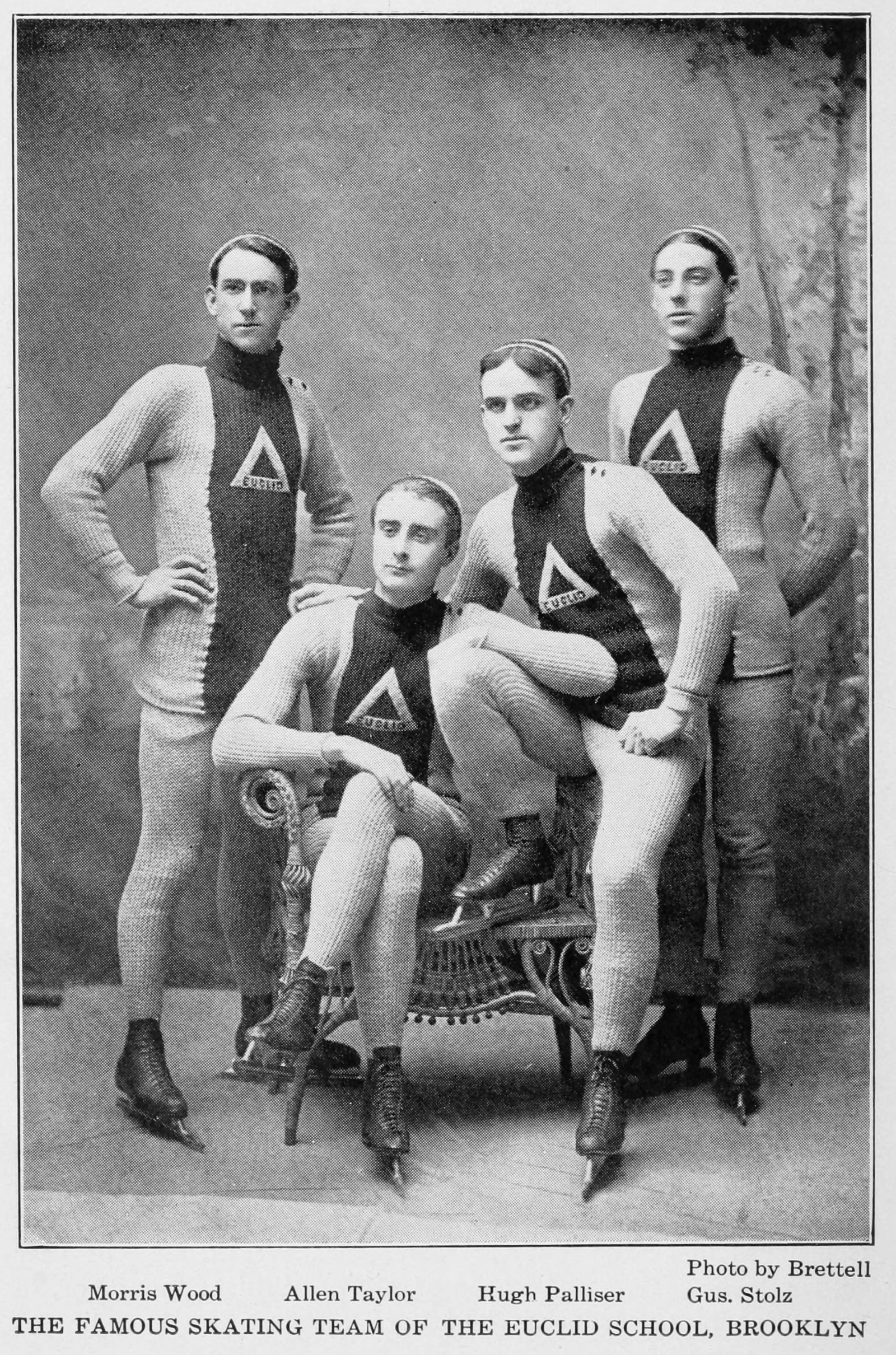
Speed skating team of the Euclid School, Brooklyn in the early 1900s. From left: Morris Wood, Allen Taylor, Hugh Palliser and Gus Stolz.

Brooklyn has an active sports scene that spans over a hundred years. The borough is home of the Barclays Center and the National Basketball Association's Brooklyn Nets, and for many decades was the home of the Brooklyn Dodgers of Major League Baseball before they moved to Los Angeles in 1957.

Brooklyn has also been a breeding place for many famous sports figures such as Joe Paterno (Penn State), Joe Pepitone (MLB), Joe Torre (MLB), Al "Bummy" Davis (boxing), Larry Brown (NBA), Mike Tyson (boxing), Paul Lo Duca (MLB), Vinny Testaverde (NFL), and Vince Lombardi (NFL).

Parks throughout the borough including Prospect Park, Marine Park, and the community sports complex at Floyd Bennett Field provide residents an opportunity to practice and hone their sports skills and talents.

== Baseball ==
=== Early baseball ===
Brooklyn has been a hotbed of baseball going back to the sport's infancy. A box score from October 21, 1845, lists a game between the New York Base Ball Club and "Brooklyn Players". The New York Base Ball Club was one of the first to play under rules codified by the New York Knickerbockers only one month earlier but no one knows the rules of that "first box score" game.

In the mid-1850's, dozens of ballclubs were formally constituted in greater New York City. When the fraternity convened for the first time to revise playing rules, 8 Brooklyn clubs were among the 16, traditionally considered the founding members of the National Association of Base Ball Players. In summer 1858, the Fashion Race Course in Corona, Queens hosted a series of three all star games between New York City and Brooklyn teams. That was a milestone in commercialization, the first baseball games with admission for sale.

Brooklyn teams dominated play in the NABBP during the early and mid-1860's, with the Atlantic, Excelsior, Eckford, and Atlantic clubs contending for championships in that order. (All three were among the 16 founding clubs. The Atlantics both preceded Excelsior and outlived Eckford as claimant to the very top spot.)

During the War, which curtailed the game greatly, William Cammeyer opened Union Grounds in Williamsburg, the first enclosed field dedicated to baseball, which put the game on a commercial basis. (It was dedicated to baseball most of the year but flooded and used for ice sports in the winter.) The Eckfords played home games at Union Grounds and the New York Mutuals relocated there in 1868, from Hoboken, New Jersey, where several Manhattan clubs were based. A second enclosed baseball park opened, the Capitoline Grounds in Bedford-Stuyvesant, served as home to the Atlantics.

=== League baseball ===
The National Association of Professional Base Ball Players (NA), the first professional league was established in 1871. The three major clubs calling Brooklyn home all joined by its second season, so both grounds are in the record books if we count the NA as a major league. For 1873 the Eckfords went out of business and the Atlantics moved in as second team at the Union Grounds, sharing with the Mutuals for three seasons. The Mutuals continued as a charter member of the National League in 1876 and the Hartfords of Brooklyn played there in 1877.

Brooklyn's most famous team, the Dodgers, got its start as a minor league team in 1883, joining the American Association in 1884, calling themselves the Bridegrooms and playing at the first of three venues called Washington Park. The team moved to the National League in 1890 and relocated to Ebbets Field in 1913. In the years prior to 1932, they were also known as the Superbas and the Robins, the last an informal name taken from their manager, Wilbert Robinson. The team name is short for "trolley dodgers", a reference to the many streetcar lines that once criss-crossed the borough.

Perennial losers, the Dodgers were called "bums" by their fans, first with derision, eventually with affection. The Dodgers greatest achievement came in 1947 when Jackie Robinson took the field in a Dodgers uniform, the first Major League African American player of the modern era. The Brooklyn Dodgers won National League pennants in 1890, 1899, 1900, 1916, 1920, 1941, 1947, 1949, 1952, and 1953, but lost the 1941, 1947, 1949, 1952 & 1953 World Series to their longtime rival the New York Yankees. In 1955, the Dodgers won their first and only World Series in Brooklyn, beating the rival New York Yankees, resulting in mass euphoria and celebrations all over Brooklyn. Just two years later, the Dodgers moved to Los Angeles, after the 1957 season, causing widespread resentment and sorrow. Brooklyn's most beloved and cherished institution had left, and the move is cited by some historians as one of the catalysts for the decline of Brooklyn in the 1960s and 1970s.

In addition, the Brooklyn Ward's Wonders of the Players' League in 1890 and the Brooklyn Tip-Tops of the Federal League in 1914 and 1915 called the borough home. The Players' League team played in Eastern Park, in what is now known as East New York. The Tip-Tops played in the final incarnation of Washington Park.

After a 43-year hiatus, baseball returned to the borough in the form of the Brooklyn Cyclones, a minor league team that began playing in Coney Island in 2001. The Cyclones were a short season Class A New York–Penn League affiliate of the New York Mets professional team. The Cyclones play at MCU Park, located in southern Brooklyn near the Coney Island Boardwalk. During hot summer nights, fireworks are sometimes used to signify the commencement of the baseball games. In the major realignment of minor league ball the Cyclones became a member of the High-A East league in 2021.

== Basketball ==
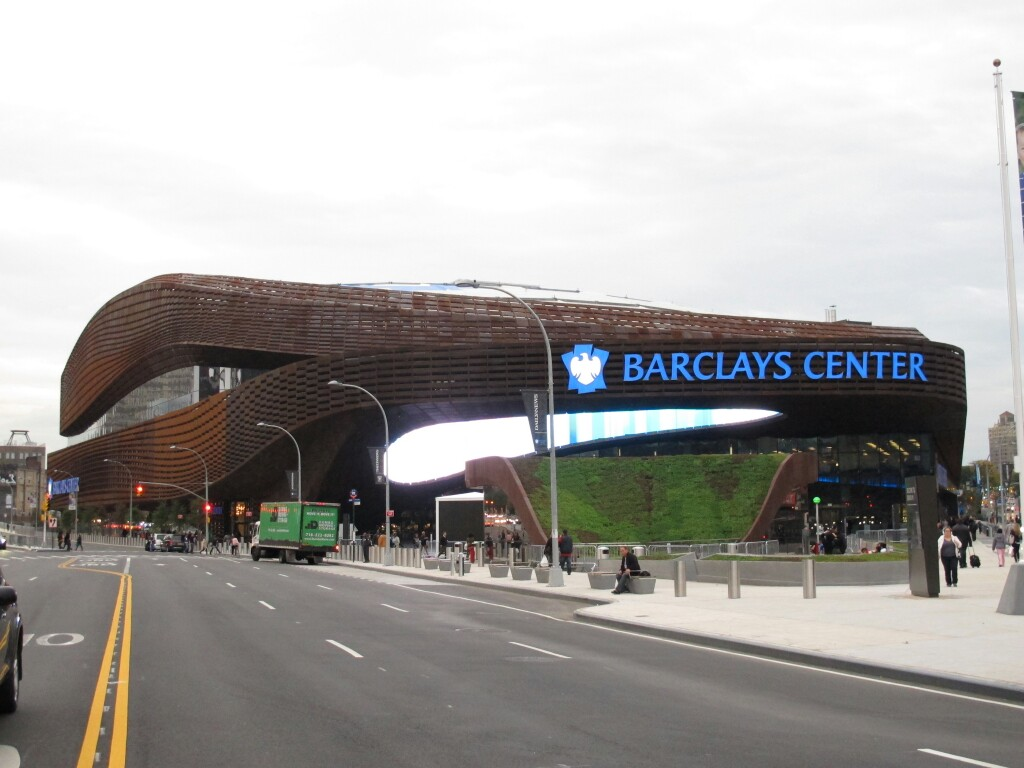
Barclays Center in Prospect Heights is Brooklyn's major league sports venue.

On January 23, 2004, developer Bruce Ratner announced that he had purchased the National Basketball Association's Nets franchise (then known as the New Jersey Nets) and started on his plan to move the Nets to the 18,000-seat Barclays Center as part of the Atlantic Yards development at Flatbush and Atlantic Avenues. After years of delays caused by community opposition and financial difficulties, the arena broke ground in March 2010 and opened in September 2012. The Nets officially changed their names to the Brooklyn Nets on April 30, 2012, and the move was made official. The Nets thus became Brooklyn's first major league sports team in 55 years.

The Brooklyn Kings, a United States Basketball League team, played in Downtown Brooklyn until 2007. The borough also had a franchise in the American Basketball Association in 2006 called the Brooklyn Wonders.

A new American Basketball Association team called the Brooklyn Skyrockets started in 2014 and plays at the Aviator Sports and Events Center at Floyd Bennett Field.

== Football ==
Several professional football teams have called Brooklyn home, including two in 1926. The Brooklyn Horsemen of the original American Football League and the Brooklyn Lions of the National Football League competed for a time before merging in November and folding at season's end.

In 1930, the Brooklyn Dodgers began play at Ebbets Field. The team lasted until 1944, calling themselves the Brooklyn Tigers that last season but going winless. In 1945, the team was merged with the Boston Yanks and played one more home game in Brooklyn that season as the Yanks.

The second AFL also had a Brooklyn Tigers club in 1936, but the team never played in Brooklyn and folded after only seven games.

In 1946, the new All-America Football Conference had yet another Brooklyn Dodgers team. This club lasted until 1948, after which it merged with the New York Yankees football team. The renamed Brooklyn-New York Yankees folded after one season when the AAFC merged with the NFL.

There was an independent minor league team called the Brooklyn Dodgers in the short-lived Continental Football League in 1966. Like the AFL Brooklyn Tigers team, they never played in Brooklyn, but were called so because baseball Dodger legend Jackie Robinson was the general manager of the team. They played their home games at Downing Stadium in Randall's Island, and then folded after one season when the team failed to draw.

Finally, the Brooklyn Bolts of the Fall Experimental Footaball League played at MCU Park from 2014 to 2015.

== Ice hockey ==
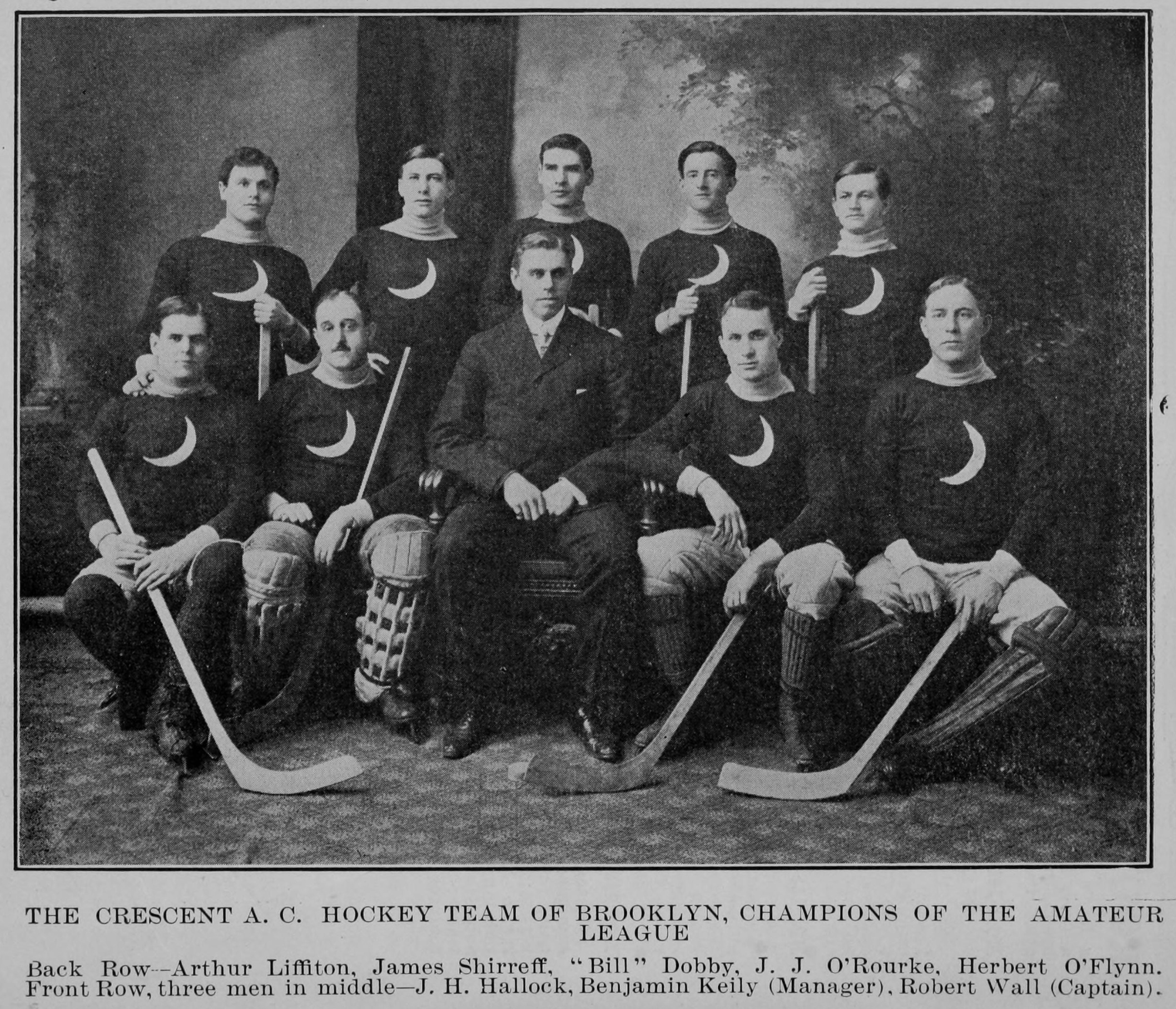
Brooklyn Crescents ice hockey team in 1905–06.

Brooklyn had two teams represented in the American Amateur Hockey League which operated from 1896 to 1917; the Brooklyn Skating Club (1896–1906) and the Brooklyn Crescents (1896–97, 1899–1917). The Brooklyn Skating Club won one championship title in 1898–99 whereas the Brooklyn Crescents captured nine championship titles between 1900 and 1912. Both teams had a considerable influx of Canadian players.

The Brooklyn Americans, formerly known as the New York Americans, were a National Hockey League club in the 1941–42 season. Despite the name, the team played its home games at Madison Square Garden and never played a game in Brooklyn. Brooklyn has two ice rink facilities, Aviator Sports and Recreation (a twin NHL regulation ice sheet facility) in Floyd Bennett Field in Southeast Brooklyn, and Abe Stark Rink in Coney Island.

The New York Aviators were a single-A minor league professional hockey team in the newly formed Federal Hockey League (FHL) which consists of six teams throughout New York State, Connecticut, and near Cornwall, Ontario. The organization changed their name to the Brooklyn Aviators before the 2011–2012 season, but folded after the season. The Aviators' home arena was the Aviator Sports and Events Center located at Floyd Bennett Field in Brooklyn, New York.

The NHL's New York Islanders moved to the Barclays Center in 2015 after playing at Nassau Veterans Memorial Coliseum since their inception in 1972. Since November 2021 the team has moved to UBS Arena in Elmont, New York.

Also in 2015, the New York Riveters, of the National Women's Hockey League, played their inaugural season at Aviator Sports and Events Center. The following year it was announced that the Riveters would relocate to Barnabas Health Hockey House at the Prudential Center in Newark, New Jersey, thus ending their tenure in Brooklyn.

== Soccer ==
A minor league soccer team called Brooklyn Knights plays at the Metropolitan Oval, which is one of the oldest soccer venues in the US but is actually located in Maspeth, Queens. The team competes in the USL PDL.

The New York Cosmos of the NASL began playing at MCU Park in 2017.

== Rugby ==
In Rugby league, the Brooklyn Kings RLFC represent Brooklyn in the professional North American Rugby League competition.

In Rugby union, Rugby United New York joined Major League Rugby in 2019. They play their home games at MCU Park in Coney Island. Brooklyn Rugby Football Club is a men's team competing in Division III of the Metropolitan Rugby Football Union and Brooklyn Women's Rugby Football Club is a women's team in Division II of the same union.

The Public School Athletic League now supports rugby too, and flag (non-contact) rugby is played in numerous public elementary, middle and high schools across the borough.

== Wrestling ==
Fans of professional wrestling have long admired Steve Lombardi, best known as The Brooklyn Brawler, as one of the sport's premier jobbers. ECW legend Tazz is also proud of his Brooklyn roots, hailing from the Red Hook area of the city.

Other well-known wrestlers from Brooklyn include:

- Nelson Erazo, best known as Homicide in TNA.
- Brandon Silvestry, best known as Low Ki in the independent ranks, also a TNA alumnus, and was with WWE, in its Florida Championship Wrestling developmental territory as Kaval. He is now on the independent scene.
- Former WWE wrestlers Shad Gaspard & JTG, also known at the time was Cryme Tyme.

== See also ==
- Sports in New York City
