= 1886 in sports =

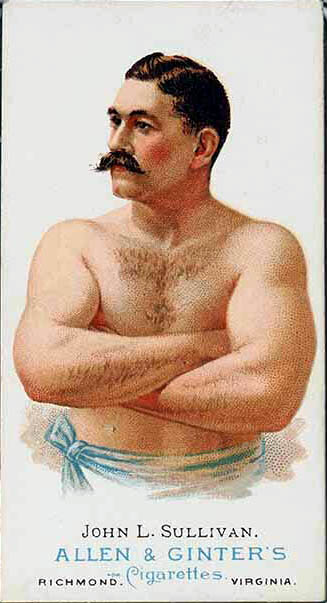
A cigarette trading card depicting John L. Sullivan and produced in 1886

1886 in sports describes the year's events in world sport.

== Athletics ==
- USA Outdoor Track and Field Championships

== American football ==
College championship

- College football national championship – Yale Bulldogs

== Association football ==
International

- Canada defeats the United States 1-0 in the first unofficial international match between the two nations.

England

- Arsenal FC founded as Dial Square FC by munitions workers from the Royal Arsenal at Woolwich in southeast London. Dial Square is the name of one of their workshops. At the end of the year, the players hold a pub meeting and change the club's name to Royal Arsenal. Five years later, the name is changed to Woolwich Arsenal. The club's present name will be adopted in 1914 after the move to Islington.
- 13 March — Tinsley Lindley scores in the first of his record 9 consecutive England games
- 10 May — The Football Association approves a proposal made by N. Lane Jackson, an Old Corinthian, that players be given a cap for every international match in which they take part.
- FA Cup final – Blackburn Rovers 2–0 West Bromwich Albion at The Oval; replay after 0–0 draw at The Oval. This is Blackburn's third successive victory and the final is the first to feature two extant members of The Football League.
- December 11 – Dial Square F.C., later to become Arsenal FC (see above)), play their first match, a 6–0 win over the Eastern Wanderers.

Ireland

- March — Linfield F.C. is formed in Belfast.

Scotland

- 20 March — John Lambie becomes the youngest Scotland player and captain, aged 17 years and 92 days.
- May 17— Motherwell Football Club is formed.
- Scottish Cup final – Queen's Park 3–1 Renton

Switzerland

- Grasshopper Club Zürich founded.

== Australian Rules Football ==
- Victorian Football Association premiers - Geelong.
- SANFL premiers - Adelaide.
- WAFL premiers - Fremantle.

== Baseball ==
National championship

- National League v. American Association – St Louis AA defeats Chicago NL, 4 games to 2.

Events

- The Sporting News established in St. Louis. It becomes the dominant American publication covering baseball, so much so that it acquires the nickname "The Bible of Baseball".

== Boxing ==
Events

- The inaugural World Lightweight Champion is Jack McAuliffe, generally recognised following his 21st-round knockout of Billy Frazier at Boston. Lightweights weigh 130 to 135 pounds. McAuliffe will hold the title until he retires undefeated in 1893.
- Jack Nonpareil Dempsey retains the World Middleweight Championship when he knocks out George LaBlanche in 13 rounds at Larchmont, NY.
- John L. Sullivan knocks out Paddy Ryan in the third round at San Francisco. Sullivan retains the World Heavyweight Championship.

Lineal world champions

- World Heavyweight Championship – John L. Sullivan
- World Middleweight Championship – Jack Nonpareil Dempsey
- World Lightweight Championship – Jack McAuliffe

== Canadian Football ==
- The Canadian Championship is not held this year.
- Montreal and Ottawa College retain their championships from the previous year.

== Cricket ==
Events

- Somerset does not play against any other first-class counties and drops out of the County Championship until 1891.
- Hampshire ceases to be a first-class county after years of difficult circumstances and poor results. They do play matches against Surrey and Sussex in 1886 but these matches are not recognised as first-class. Hampshire will not recover first-class status until the beginning of the 1895 season when they will be readmitted to the County Championship.

England

- Champion County – Nottinghamshire (fourth consecutive season)
- Most runs – W. G. Grace 1,846 @ 35.50 (HS 170)
- Most wickets – George Lohmann 160 @ 15.15 (BB 8–43)

Australia

- Most runs – John McIlwraith 315 @ 78.75 (HS 133)
- Most wickets – Fred Spofforth 18 @ 15.22 (BB 5–43)

== Field hockey ==
Events

- 18 January — modern field hockey is born with the formation of the Hockey Association in England, which codifies the sport's rules

== Gaelic Athletic Association ==
Events

- Wexford GAA becomes the first of the 32 GAA county boards

== Golf ==
Major tournaments

- British Open – David Brown

Other tournaments

- British Amateur – Horace Hutchinson

== Horse racing ==
England

- Grand National – Old Joe
- 1,000 Guineas Stakes – Miss Jummy
- 2,000 Guineas Stakes – Ormonde
- The Derby – Ormonde
- The Oaks – Miss Jummy
- St. Leger Stakes – Ormonde

Australia

- Melbourne Cup – Arsenal

Canada

- Queen's Plate – Wild Rose

Ireland

- Irish Grand National – Castle Lucas
- Irish Derby Stakes – Theodemir

USA

- Kentucky Derby – Ben Ali
- Preakness Stakes – The Bard
- Belmont Stakes – Inspector B

== Ice hockey ==
Events

- 8 December — world's first championship ice hockey league, the Amateur Hockey Association of Canada (AHAC) is formed at a meeting in Montreal

== Rowing ==
The Boat Race

- 3 April — Cambridge wins the 43rd Oxford and Cambridge Boat Race

== Rugby football ==
Home Nations Championship

- The 4th series is shared by Scotland and England who win two matches each.

== Tennis ==
England

- Wimbledon Men's Singles Championship – William Renshaw (GB) defeats Herbert Lawford (GB) 6–0 5–7 6–3 6–4
- Wimbledon Women's Singles Championship – Blanche Bingley (GB) defeats Maud Watson (GB) 6–3 6–3

USA

- American Men's Singles Championship – Richard D. Sears (USA) defeats R. Livingston Beeckman (USA) 4–6 6–1 6–3 6–4

World

- The 10th pre-open era Men's Tennis tour gets underway 85 tournaments are staged this year the tour runs from 24 April to 12 November 1886.

== Yacht racing ==
America's Cup

- The New York Yacht Club retains the America's Cup as Mayflower defeats British challenger Galatea, of the Royal Northern Yacht Club, 2 races to 0
