= 1868 in sports =

1868 in sports describes the year's events in world sport.

== Baseball ==
National championship

- National Association of Base Ball Players champion – New York Mutuals

Events

- A few clubs count base hits and total bases on hits for every player, beside the commonplace "official scoring" of runs and times put out (hands lost)
- In December the National Association permits full professionalism for 1869. The Cincinnati Red Stockings recruit with great success.

== Boxing ==
Events

- With the arrival in America of English boxers Jem Mace and Tom Allen, there are several claimants for the American Championship including Joe Coburn and Bill Davis, but the most credible claims remain with Jimmy Elliott and Mike McCoole.
- 27 May — Mike McCoole is due to meet Joe Coburn at Cold Spring Station, Indiana, in a fight billed as for the Heavyweight Championship of America, but police intervene and the fight is not held. Coburn and his trainer, Jim Cusick, are arrested.
- 4 September — McCoole is due to fight former champion John C. Heenan near St. Louis, Missouri, but the fight is cancelled. McCoole continues to claim the American Championship.
- 12 November — McCoole's only serious rival Jimmy Elliott defeats Charley Gallagher in the 23rd round at Peach Island, near Detroit, Michigan.

== Cricket ==
Events

- A team of Australian Aboriginals tours England, the first organised group of Australian cricketers to travel overseas and the first overseas team to complete a tour of England, although none of the matches have subsequently been given first-class status.

England

- Most runs – Harry Jupp 965 @ 24.74 (HS 134)
- Most wickets – James Southerton 150 @ 13.86 (BB 8–34)

== Golf ==
Major tournaments

- British Open – Tom Morris junior

== Horse racing ==
Events

- Formosa becomes the first horse to win four classic races in a single year, although one victory is a dead heat.

England

- Grand National – The Lamb (first of two wins)
- 1,000 Guineas Stakes – Formosa
- 2,000 Guineas Stakes – Formosa and Moslem (dead heat)
- The Derby – Blue Gown
- The Oaks – Formosa
- St. Leger Stakes – Formosa

Australia

- Melbourne Cup – Glencoe II

Canada

- Queen's Plate – Nettie

Ireland

- Irish Derby Stakes – Madeira

USA

- Belmont Stakes – General Duke

== Lacrosse ==
Events

- White players in Upstate New York begin playing lacrosse and it spreads through the New York City metropolitan area, where teams are soon organized.

== Rowing ==
The Boat Race

- 4 April — Oxford wins the 25th Oxford and Cambridge Boat Race

Other events

- The world champion "Paris Crew" from Saint John, New Brunswick wins the Championship of America in Springfield, Massachusetts

== Rugby football ==
Events

- Foundation of York FC (initially rugby union, then Northern Union, i.e. rugby league)
