= 1860 in sports =

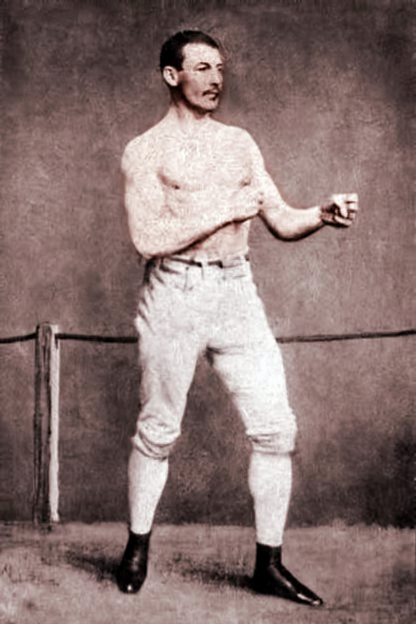
John C Heenan

1860 in sports describes the year's events in world sport.

== Australian rules football ==
- 9 clubs, led by St Kilda, organize a meeting to develop a unified set of rules. Eventually the representatives agree to use all but one of the Melbourne Football Club's rules. Geelong, who could not attend the meeting, sent their own set for approval.

== Baseball ==
National championship

- National Association of Base Ball Players champion – Brooklyn Atlantics

Events

- The Excelsior club from Brooklyn, led by the fast pitcher Jim Creighton, tours as far as Buffalo, New York, to spread the game.

== Boxing ==
Events

- 17 April — one of the most famous fights of the bareknuckle era takes place at Farnborough, Hampshire, when English Champion Tom Sayers meets American Champion John C. Heenan in what is effectively a World Championship bout. After 42 rounds, the crowd breaks into the ring and the fight is stopped, both boxers having taken heavy punishment, although Heenan seemingly had the advantage. The result is a draw.
- 20 May — Sayers is awarded a special Silver Championship Belt to commemorate the fight and he now announces his retirement from boxing. Heenan is awarded a duplicate belt.
- But the brutality of the fight is widely publicised and gives rise to condemnation of the sport by a public that is increasingly influenced by Victorian ethics and morality. The legacy of the Heenan–Sayers fight is that it will bring about the demise of bareknuckle fighting in England.
- 5 November — Tom Paddock fights Sam Hurst for the vacant Heavyweight Championship of England at a venue in Berkshire. Hurst wins in only five rounds and is awarded the championship belt by Tom Sayers. This is Paddock's final fight.

== Cricket ==
Events

- John Jackson is again credited with over 100 first-class wickets in the season, establishing a new record with 109

England

- Most runs – Thomas Hayward 557 @ 26.52 (HS 132)
- Most wickets – John Jackson 109 @ 9.20 (BB 9–34)

== Football ==
Events

- Formation of TSV 1860 München as a physical fitness and gymnastics club. As a club, it is the world's oldest that is currently involved in senior professional association football, but in fact the club does not create a football department until 6 March 1899 or play its first matches until 1902.
- The now defunct Lausanne Football and Cricket Club is founded in Switzerland, the first football club to be formed outside England, although it is believed to have been primarily a cricket club.
- 26 December — the earliest known inter-club association football match (i.e., under Sheffield Rules) is played and Sheffield F.C. defeats Hallam F.C. 2–0.
- Formation of Manchester Football Club, now called Manchester Rugby Club, which is one of the oldest rugby union clubs

== Golf ==
Major tournaments

- The inaugural British Open is won by Willie Park senior at Prestwick Golf Club. The tournament is initially limited to professional players but becomes "open" in 1861.

== Horse racing ==
Events

- Inaugural running of the Queen's Plate in Canada is won by Don Juan

England

- Grand National – Anatis
- 1,000 Guineas Stakes – Sagitta
- 2,000 Guineas Stakes – The Wizard
- The Derby – Thormanby
- The Oaks – Butterfly
- St. Leger Stakes – St Albans

Canada

- Queen's Plate – Don Juan

== Rowing ==
The Boat Race

- 31 March — Cambridge wins the 17th Oxford and Cambridge Boat Race

Other events

- Foundation of both Thames Rowing Club and Twickenham Rowing Club in London
- 24 July — Harvard wins the 4th Harvard–Yale Regatta (a single race).
