= 1864 in sports =

1864 in sports describes the year's events in world sport.

== Association football ==
Events

- 7 December — Notts County, then called Notts FC, is formally established and remains the oldest club in the Football League

== Australian rules football ==
- Carlton Football Club was founded in Victoria on July.

== Baseball ==
National championship

- National Association of Base Ball Players champion – Brooklyn Atlantics

Events

- The Atlantic club of Brooklyn, New York suffers only one early tie. One match is at Rochester against the Young Canadian club of Woodstock, Ontario, 75–11.
- New rules empower the umpire to "call" balls (bad pitches) and eventually award first base on balls, practically limiting the number of pitches and the length of each batsman's turn.

== Boxing ==
Events

- Tom King retires and the English Championship becomes vacant till 1866.
- American Champion Joe Coburn tries unsuccessfully to set up a fight with former English Champion Jem Mace. There are challenges to Coburn from Mike McCoole and Jimmy Elliott.

== Canadian Football ==
- The first set of rules of Canadian Football, heavily based on rugby football, is created.

== Cricket ==
Events

- Law 10 is rewritten by MCC to allow a bowler to bring his arm through at any height providing he keeps it straight and does not "throw" the ball. The issue of overarm bowling has crystallised in the Willsher-Lillywhite incident of August 1862.
- The concept of a champion county gains popularity when newspapers begin to publish tables of inter-county match results
- 12 January — formation of Lancashire County Cricket Club at a meeting in Manchester
- 27–29 January — Otago v. Canterbury at Dunedin is the start of first-class cricket in New Zealand
- Madras v. Calcutta is the start of first-class cricket in India
- First issue of Wisden Cricketers' Almanack

England

- Most runs – Will Mortlock 855 @ 34.20 (HS 105)
- Most wickets – James Grundy 99 @ 11.31 (BB 9–19)

== Golf ==
Major tournaments

- British Open – Tom Morris senior

== Horse racing ==
Events

- Inaugural running of the Travers Stakes at Saratoga Springs, New York is won by Kentucky

England

- Grand National – Emblematic
- 1,000 Guineas Stakes – Tomato
- 2,000 Guineas Stakes – General Peel
- The Derby – Blair Athol
- The Oaks – Fille de l'Air
- St. Leger Stakes – Blair Athol

Australia

- Melbourne Cup – Lantern

Canada

- Queen's Plate – Brunette

== Rowing ==
The Boat Race

- 19 March — Oxford wins the 21st Oxford and Cambridge Boat Race

Other events

- 29 July — Yale wins the fifth Harvard–Yale Regatta, its first victory. The Race is resumed after three years off although the American Civil War will continue to next April.

== Rugby football ==
Events

- Foundation of Huddersfield RLFC which is the oldest Rugby Football League member
