= 1861 in sports =

1861 in sports describes the year's events in world sport.

== Baseball ==
National championship

- National Association of Base Ball Players champion – Brooklyn Atlantics

Events

- The National Association establishes the December annual meeting, a change from March, meeting twice during calendar 1860. Membership slips from 59 to 55 clubs and then the outbreak of the American Civil War in the spring sharply cuts both inter-city travel and the number of matches played in greater New York City. Some clubs practically disband.

== Boxing ==
Events

- 18 June — Jem Mace defeats Sam Hurst in eight rounds at Medway Island to win the Heavyweight Championship of England. Hurst retires from boxing.
- John C. Heenan retains the Championship of America but there is no record of any fights involving him in 1861.

== Cricket ==
Events

- 20 October — the first English team to tour Australia sets sail from Liverpool. The team is captained by H. H. Stephenson. No first-class matches are played.

England

- Most runs – Robert Carpenter 883 @ 30.44 (HS 106)
- Most wickets – Edgar Willsher 87 @ 11.65 (BB 8–27)

== Football ==
Events

- Foundation of Richmond FC and Sale Sharks which are two of the oldest senior rugby union clubs
- The first documented match of Canadian football is played at University College in the University of Toronto. It is unclear the rules for this game.

== Golf ==
Major tournaments

- British Open – Tom Morris senior

== Horse racing ==
Events

- The inaugural running of the Melbourne Cup in Australia is won by Archer. The Melbourne Cup is a race for three-year-olds and above, over a distance of 3,200 metres (approximately two miles).

England

- Grand National – Jealousy
- 1,000 Guineas Stakes – Nemesis
- 2,000 Guineas Stakes – Diophantus
- The Derby – Kettledrum
- The Oaks – Brown Duchess
- St. Leger Stakes – Caller Ou

Australia

- Melbourne Cup – Archer

Canada

- Queen's Plate – Wild Irishman

== Rowing ==
The Boat Race

- 23 March — Oxford wins the 18th Oxford and Cambridge Boat Race

Other events

- Harvard–Yale Regatta – not contested 1861 to 1863
