= 1863 in sports =

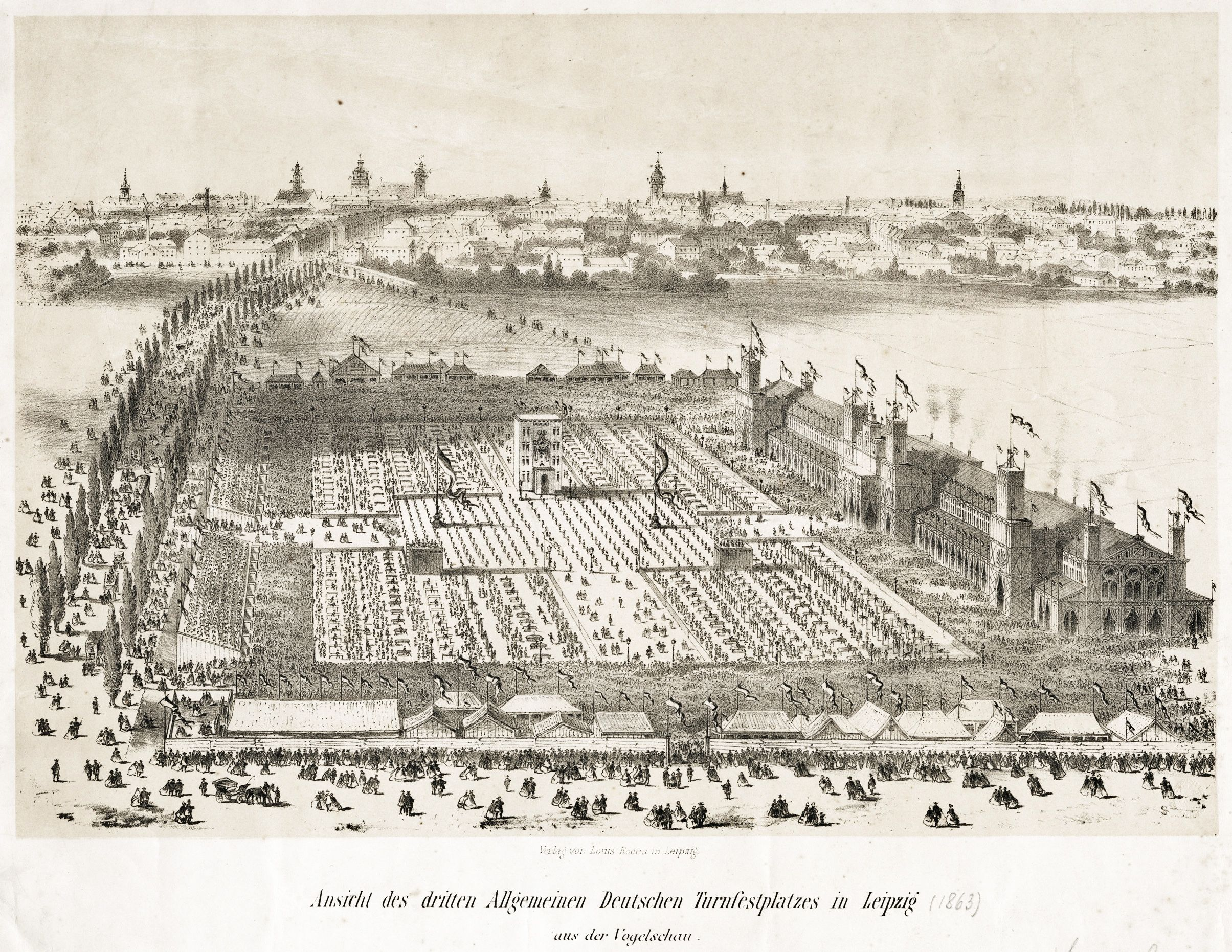
General German Gymnastics Festival 1863, bird's eye view of the festival square

1863 in sports describes the year's events in world sport.

== Baseball ==
National championship

- National Association of Base Ball Players champion – Brooklyn Eckfords

Events

- The champion Eckford club of Brooklyn, New York wins all ten matches against National Association members, a run that began in August 1862

== Boxing ==
Events

- 5 May — Joe Coburn defeats Mike McCoole after 67 rounds and is now widely recognised as American Champion.
- 10 December — Tom King defeats John C. Heenan in the 24th round to retain the English Championship title. This is Heenan's final fight.

== Cricket ==
Events

- 8 January — formation of Yorkshire County Cricket Club out of the Sheffield Match Fund Committee that has been established in 1861. Yorkshire CCC plays its initial first-class match v. Surrey at The Oval on 4, 5 & 6 June. It is a rain-affected draw, evenly balanced.
- 12 August — formation of Hampshire County Cricket Club. A number of previous county organisations including the famous Hambledon Club have existed in Hampshire during the previous hundred years or more, but none have survived indefinitely.
- 15 December — formation of Middlesex County Cricket Club at a meeting in the London Tavern.
- An organisation in Cheltenham is believed to have been the forerunner of Gloucestershire County Cricket Club, which has definitely been founded by 1871. Exact details of the club's foundation have been lost.

England

- Most runs – Will Mortlock 736 @ 26.28 (HS 106)
- Most wickets – George Wootton 87 @ 9.74 (BB 8–9)

== Football ==
Rules

- 26 October — foundation by local clubs of the Football Association (FA) in London. The first set of Laws is drafted, based mainly on the Cambridge University Rules. The purpose is to regulate English football under a single code of rules, but the rugby football clubs do not join because of the ball handling issue. Their attempt at compromise between the "dribbling" and "handling" codes is rejected by the dribblers and so rugby football becomes in time an entirely separate sport. The FA rules establish association football (aka football or "soccer") as a distinct sport.
- Apart from their main purpose of introducing standard rules of play and procedure, the Laws seek to differentiate between association football and rugby football. The essential difference in the two codes is encapsulated in Laws 9 and 11 which state that no (outfield) player shall run with the ball (in his hands) and that no (outfield) player shall throw the ball or pass it to another with his hands. The Laws will be amended later to clarify the situation at throw ins and during possession by goalkeepers but the FA is emphatic from the start that "hand ball" is illegal during normal play.
- These Laws are originally known as the "London Rules" because they are only adopted by some London clubs and hardly anywhere else. Several clubs exist in Sheffield at the time and they play to the so–called Sheffield Rules. Gradually the FA, led by Charles Alcock, manages to persuade the clubs that a uniform set of rules is desirable and, after many adaptations and compromises, the FA rules eventually become standard.
- The rejection of handling causes the "Rugby rules" clubs and colleges to withdraw from the FA and they will eventually found the Rugby Football Union in 1871.

Clubs founded

- Probable foundation of Stoke City as Stoke Ramblers, although it is not known to have played any matches until 1868. If founded in 1863, it is the second oldest senior professional club playing association football after Notts County.
- Foundation of the original Bradford Football Club, playing rugby rules, which in 1907 will become Bradford Park Avenue A.F.C.

== Golf ==
Major tournaments

- British Open – Willie Park senior

== Horse racing ==
England

- Grand National – Emblem
- 1,000 Guineas Stakes – Lady Augusta
- 2,000 Guineas Stakes – Macaroni
- The Derby – Macaroni
- The Oaks – Queen Bertha
- St. Leger Stakes – Lord Clifden

Australia

- Melbourne Cup – Banker

Canada

- Queen's Plate – Touchstone

== Rowing ==
The Boat Race

- 28 March — Oxford wins the 20th Oxford and Cambridge Boat Race
