= 1888 in sports =

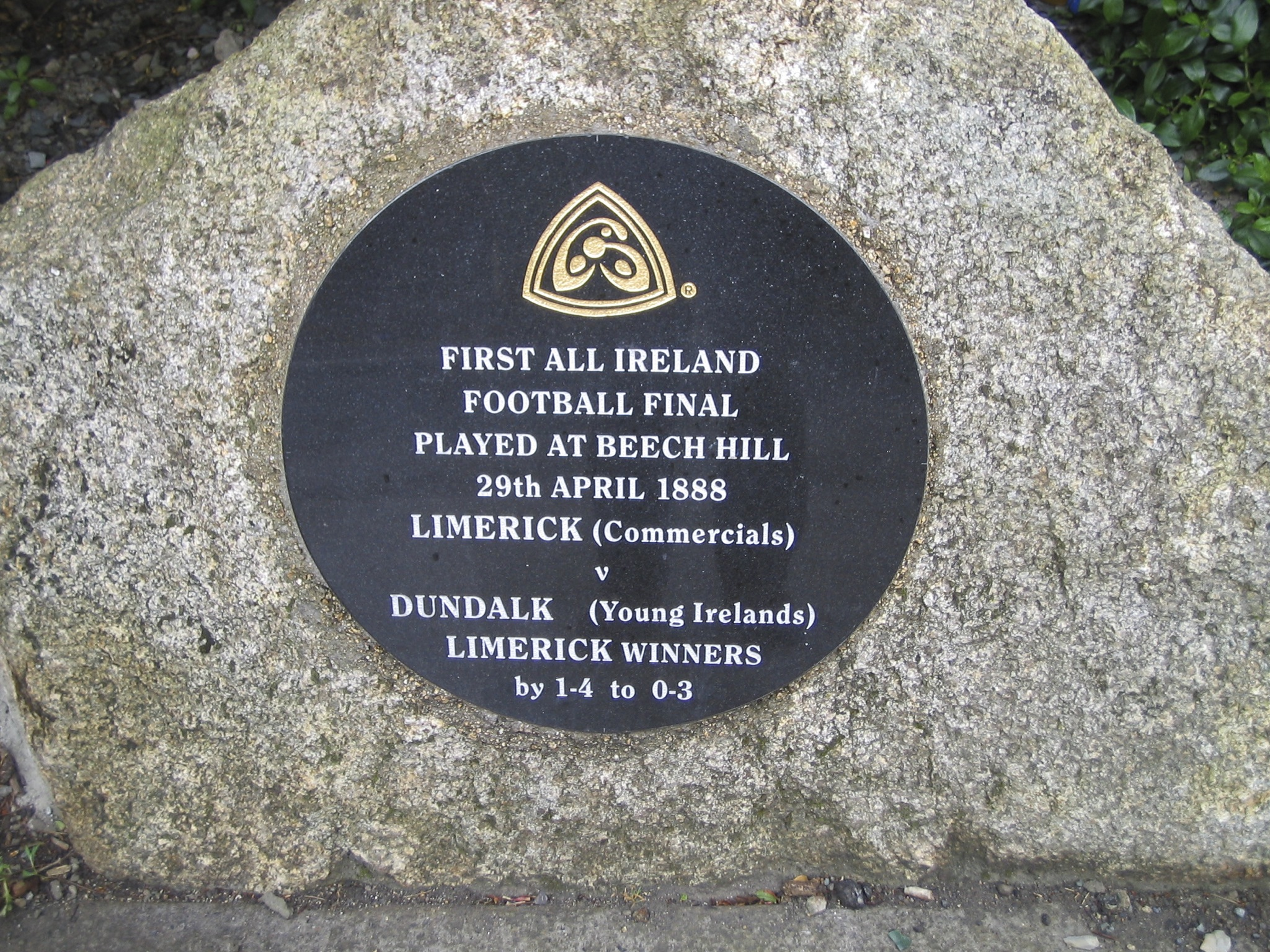

1888 in sports describes the year's events in world sport.

== Athletics ==
- USA Outdoor Track and Field Championships

== American football ==
College championship

- College football national championship – Yale Bulldogs (coached by Walter Camp)

Events

- Tackling below the waist is legalised.

== Association football ==
England

- FA Cup final – West Bromwich Albion 2–1 Preston North End at The Oval
- Walsall Town and Walsall Swifts merge to form Walsall Football Club. The club initially plays under the name of Walsall Town Swifts.
- Small Heath, later Birmingham City, is the first football club to form a limited company
- 7 March — Tinsley Lindley scores in his ninth consecutive England game, a record that still stands.

Origin of the Football League

- One of the problems facing professionalism is the lack of competitive matches, especially for teams that have been knocked out of the FA Cup. It is self–evident that crowds for friendly fixtures are much lower, which means a reduction in revenue and consequent struggle to pay wages.
- Aston Villa's Scottish director William McGregor seeks a solution by asking other professional clubs to arrange annual home and away fixtures on a competitive basis, with points to be awarded for winning and drawing. Following a conference between club directors on 23 March, the English Football League is founded on 17 April as one division of twelve clubs.
- The founder members are: Accrington F.C. (1888–1893), Aston Villa, Blackburn Rovers, Bolton Wanderers, Burnley, Derby County, Everton, Notts County, Preston North End, Stoke F.C., West Bromwich Albion and Wolverhampton Wanderers.

Hungary

- MTK Budapest FC was founded.

India

- Durand Cup instituted by Mortimer Durand as recreation for British troops stationed in India. It is the oldest tournament in India and the third oldest in the world.

Scotland

- Scottish Cup Final – Renton 6–1 Cambuslang
- Celtic Football Club is founded by members of the Marist Order, a teaching institute, as a way of raising money for a poor children's charity. The club's first ground is a piece of rented land not far from the present Celtic Park. Celtic's first recorded match is a home "friendly" against Rangers; Celtic win 5–2 in what is therefore the inaugural "Old Firm Game".

== Australian Rules Football ==
- The VFA premiership is officially established, before 1888, the premier was decided by press consensus.
- Victorian Football Association premiers - South Melbourne
- SANFL premiers - Norwood
- WAFL premiers - Unions

== Baseball ==
National championship

- National League v. American Association – New York Giants (NL) defeats Saint Louis Cardinals (AA) 6 games to 4.

Events

- The last of many adjustments finally sets four balls and three strikes for a "walk" and a strikeout.

== Boxing ==
Events

- 10 March - Heavyweight Boxing champ John L. Sullivan draws Charlie Mitchell in 30 rounds
- 30 October - The inaugural World Welterweight Champion is Paddy Duffy of Boston, Massachusetts who is recognised following his 17th-round knockout of Billy McMillan at Fort Foote, Virginia on 30 October. Duffy retains the title until his death (by tuberculosis) in 1890. The welterweight division is for fighters weighing between 140 and 147lb.

Lineal world champions

- World Heavyweight Championship – John L. Sullivan
- World Middleweight Championship – Jack Nonpareil Dempsey
- World Welterweight Championship – Paddy Duffy
- World Lightweight Championship – Jack McAuliffe

== Canadian Football ==
- Ottawa College remains the champion of the ORFU after defeating the Hamilton Tigers 10–1.
- As the Canadian Rugby Football Union no longer existed, Ottawa College and the QRFU champions, Montreal, organize the Dominion Championship, which ends in a nil-nil draw.

== Cricket ==
Events

- After a run of disastrous results over a number of seasons, Derbyshire is demoted from first-class status and the 1888 championship is contested by only eight teams: Gloucestershire, Kent, Lancashire, Middlesex, Nottinghamshire, Surrey, Sussex and Yorkshire. Derbyshire will recover first-class status in 1894 and join the official County Championship in 1895.
- 5 July — formation of Glamorgan County Cricket Club at a meeting in the Angel Hotel, Cardiff.
- Thanks mainly to the bowling of Bobby Peel, England defeats Australia 2–1 to retain The Ashes.

England

- Champion County – Surrey
- Most runs – W. G. Grace 1,886 @ 32.51 (HS 215)
- Most wickets – Charlie Turner 283 @ 11.68 (BB 9–15)
- Wisden Six Great Bowlers of the Year – George Lohmann, Johnny Briggs, John Ferris, Charlie Turner, Sammy Woods, Bobby Peel

Australia

- Most runs – Harry Moses 815 @ 62.69 (HS 297*)
- Most wickets – Charlie Turner 106 @ 13.59 (BB 8–39)

== Golf ==
February 22 - “Father of American Golf” John Reid first demonstrates golf on a Yonkers cow pasture to friends

Major tournaments

- British Open – Jack Burns

Other tournaments

- British Amateur – John Ball

== Horse racing ==
England

- Grand National – Playfair
- 1,000 Guineas Stakes – Briar-root
- 2,000 Guineas Stakes – Ayrshire
- The Derby – Ayrshire
- The Oaks – Seabreeze
- St. Leger Stakes – Seabreeze

Australia

- Melbourne Cup – Mentor

Canada

- Queen's Plate – Harry Cooper

Ireland

- Irish Grand National – The Maroon
- Irish Derby Stakes – Theodolite

USA

- Kentucky Derby – MacBeth II
- Preakness Stakes – Refund
- Belmont Stakes – Sir Dixon

== Ice hockey ==
- March 15 – Montreal Hockey Club defeats Montreal Victorias 2–1 in a playoff to capture the 1888 AHAC championship.

== Rowing ==
The Boat Race

- 24 March — Cambridge wins the 45th Oxford and Cambridge Boat Race

== Rugby football ==
Home Nations Championship

- The 1888 Home Nations Championship is the 6th series of the Home Nations Championship contested by Ireland, Scotland and Wales. England is excluded due to its refusal to join the International Rugby Board. The teams win one match apiece and the title is shared by all three.

Other events

- The 1888 British Isles tour of New Zealand and Australia sees the first overseas touring rugby team from Britain. The tour is a private venture and not authorised by the Home Nations.
- The 1888–1889 New Zealand Native football team are the first overseas rugby tourists from the Southern Hemisphere. The team plays matches under Rugby football, Victorian Rules football and Association football codes.
- Bristol Football Club is formed when the Carlton club merges with rival club Redland Park to create a united Bristol team.

== Tennis ==
England

- Wimbledon Men's Singles Championship – Ernest Renshaw (GB) defeats Herbert Lawford (GB) 6–3 7–5 6–0
- Wimbledon Women's Singles Championship – Lottie Dod (GB) defeats Blanche Bingley Hillyard (GB) 6–3 6–3

USA

- American Men's Singles Championship – Henry Slocum (USA) defeats Howard A. Taylor (USA) 6–4 6–1 6–0
- American Women's Singles Championship – Bertha Townsend (USA) defeats Ellen Hansell (USA) 6–3 6–5
