= 1874 in sports =

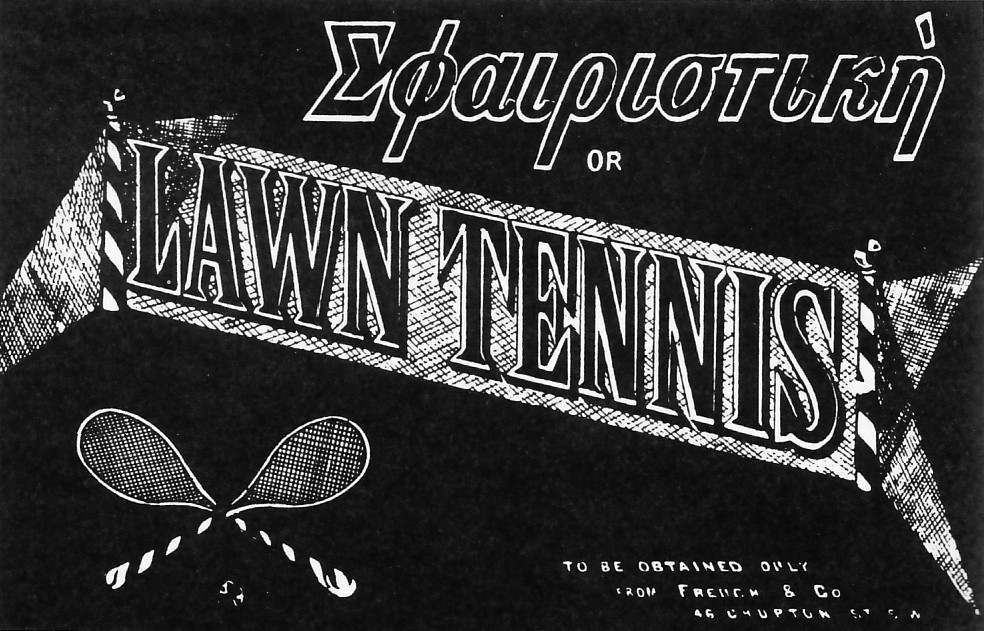
Cover of Lawn Tennis

The following events occurred in world sport in the year 1874.

== American football ==
College championship

- College football national championship – Yale Bulldogs

Events

- Harvard Crimson plays McGill Redmen under rules taken from both association football and rugby football: it is hence arguably the first game of American football as a distinctive code

== Association football ==
England

- FA Cup final – Oxford University 2–0 Royal Engineers at Kennington Oval, London. The Oval becomes the regular venue for the FA Cup Final with this game, after Lillie Bridge was used in 1873. All finals until 1892 are played at The Oval.
- March — Aston Villa founded by the Wesleyan Chapel at Villa Cross near Aston Park in Birmingham.
- Bolton Wanderers founded as a Sunday School team at Christ Church, Blackburn Street, Bolton.
- The Football Association makes a rule change so that teams change ends at half time.
- The first shin pads are introduced.

Scotland

- 21 March — inaugural Scottish Cup final is won 2–0 by Queen's Park against Clydesdale at Hampden Park, Glasgow.
- Hearts, Greenock Morton and Hamilton Academical all founded.

== Baseball ==
National championship

- National Association of Professional Base Ball Players champion – Boston Red Stockings (third consecutive season)

== Boxing ==
Events

- No major bouts take place in 1874. Tom Allen retains the American Championship.

== Cricket ==
Events

- W. G. Grace becomes the first player to perform the double in an English season. In 21 first-class matches, he scores 1664 runs and takes 140 wickets.

England

- Champion County – Gloucestershire
- Most runs – W. G. Grace 1664 @ 52.00 (HS 179)
- Most wickets – W. G. Grace 140 @ 12.70 (BB 7–18)

== Golf ==
Major tournaments

- British Open – Mungo Park

== Horse racing ==
England

- Grand National – Reugny
- 1,000 Guineas Stakes – Apology
- 2,000 Guineas Stakes – Atlantic
- The Derby – George Frederick
- The Oaks – Apology
- St. Leger Stakes – Apology

Australia

- Melbourne Cup – Haricot

Canada

- Queen's Plate – The Swallow

Ireland

- Irish Grand National – Sailor
- Irish Derby Stakes – Ben Battle

USA

- Preakness Stakes – Culpepper
- Belmont Stakes – Saxon

== Ice hockey ==
Events

- The Montreal Victorias hockey club, members of the Victoria Skating Club, begin play of ice hockey at the Victoria Skating Rink, leading to the first organized indoor game in 1875. The club does not formally exist until several years later, in 1877 or 1881.

== Rowing ==
The Boat Race

- 28 March — Cambridge wins the 31st Oxford and Cambridge Boat Race

== Rugby football ==
Events

- Coventry RFC, Newport RFC and Swansea RFC are all established in 1874
