= 1865 Grand National =

English steeplechase horse race

- Grand National
- Location: Aintree
- Date: 8 March 1865
- Winning horse: (France) Alcibiade
- Starting price: 100/7
- Jockey: Capt. Henry Coventry
- Trainer: Cornell
- Owner: Ben 'Cherry' Angell
- Conditions: Soft

The 1865 Grand National was the 27th renewal of the Grand National horse race that took place at Aintree near Liverpool, England, on 8 March 1865.

== The Course ==
First circuit: Fence 1 {15} Double post and rails replaced with a ditch Fence 2 {16} Ditch and Bank, Fence 3 {17} Double Rails, Fence 4 {18} Rails and Ditch, Fence 5 {19} Becher's Brook, widened by 2 feet this year Fence 6 {20} Post and Rails, Fence 7 {21} Post and Rails Fence 8 {22} Extreme Turn, often referred to as the Canal Turn in previous years, Fence 9 {23} Valentine's Brook, Fence 10 {24} Ditch and Quickset, Fence 11 {25} Post and Rails, Fence 12 {26} Stump Hedge and Ditch.

The runners then crossed the lane at the canal bridge to re-enter the racecourse proper, turning at the first opportunity towards the fences in front of the stands. Fence 13 Gorse Hurdle, Fence 14 Artificial Brook.

Second circuit: The runners then turned away from the Grandstands again and crossed what had been known in the 1850s as Proceed's Lane, following the same circuit until reaching the racecourse again. This time the runners continued to the wider extreme of the course before turning to run up the straight in front of the stands where Fence 27 Hurdle had to be jumped.

The runners then bypassed the Gorsed Hurdle and Artificial brook inside before reaching the winning post in front of the Main Stand.

== Leading Contenders ==
Emblematic was made 5/1 favourite to repeat her victory of last year after being declared over her sister by owner, Lord Coventry. George Stevens also opted to partner her.

Joe Maley scored 100/12 as a newcomer and rode alongside twenty-year-old debutant Johnny Page.

Stanton was third in the market at 9/1, providing George Waddington with a third ride in the race, having previously steered Old Ben Roe around to finish third in 1861.

Arbury was sent off at 100/8 with a now proven track record around Aintree, having been runner up in each of the last two years. Charlie Boyce was the most experienced rider in the race and was leaving the weighing room for his thirteenth National, having won on Emigrant in 1857.

Emblem also at 100/8 had beaten Arbury two years ago and was a full sister to Emblematic who was preferred by both Lord Coventry and George Stevens. A lesser known rider named William Walters got the mount as his debut in the race.

Princess Dagmar was also 100/8 and yet another mare fancied in an era where they regularly outperformed the males. George Holman was having his third ride in the race, having previously finished fourth two years earlier.

Among the dark horses were Tony Lumpkin at 100/7, and Alcibiade at 100/6 who was providing a first ride in the race for his owner, Captain Henry 'Bee' Coventry.

== The Race ==
Acrobat caused a delay at the start with his eagerness to get underway, only to then dig his heels in when they did start, eventually having to be walked back to the stables. Meanwood took the early lead going to the first, chased by Joe Maley, Arbury, Merrimac, Market Gardener, Flyfisher, The Czar and Stanton. Market Gardener and Tumbler both refused at the first while the rest of the field was stretched to nearly a quarter of a mile by the time Meanwood jumped Becher's Brook, clear of Merrimac, Arbury, Joe Maley, Flyfisher and The Czar. Mistake lost a lot of ground when almost refusing here while the rest of the field closed up crossing the plough of the Canal Side before reaching the top of the racecourse.

Arbury took up the running heading towards the Gorsed hurdle, adopting a line separate from the rest of the field with Joe Maley heading the main field. These two took the water in front, followed by Merrimac, Emblem, Flyfisher, Meanwood, The Czar, Hall Court, Alcibiade, Tony Lumpkin, Stanton, Princess Dagmar, Ballycasey, Philosopher, Lightheart, Mistake, having got back into the pack after his earlier refusal, ahead of Emblematic. The Dwarf, Tumbler and Express were all tailed off, pulling up at this stage.

Arbury and Joe Maley led the field out onto the second circuit before the latter fell at the sixteenth fence where Meanwood also pulled up while Tony Lumpkin and Princess Dagmar followed suit soon after. Ballycasey joined the casualties, falling at the fence before Becher's, where Stanton refused, the loose horse continuing to trouble the near tailed off Emblematic who was by this time out of contention.

Arbury had been increasing his lead at every fence and was starting to look the likely winner when Becher's caught him out and ended his race. Merrimac was now left twenty lengths clear of the chasing pack of Hall Court, The Czar, Flyfisher, Alcibiade, Emblem, Mistake, Philosopher and Lightheart.

The Czar came to grief at Valentines to leave Hall Court to hunt down Merrimac while Alcibiade began to close on the leading pair. Crossing the lane back on to the course the leader was swallowed up as the two captains now made for home. Hall Court turned for the final hurdle in front with Alcibiade the only realistic challenger. In a terrific struggle, Alcibiade drew level and gradually got the upper hand to win by the slenderest of margins. Emblematic came through tired horses to finish a distant third, Mistake fourth, Merrimac fifth while Flyfisher and Emblem pulled up before the finish

== Finishing Order ==
| Position | Name | Jockey | Handicap (st-lb) | SP | Distance | Colours |
|---|---|---|---|---|---|---|
| Winner | Alcibiade | Captain Henry 'Bee' Coventry | 11-4 | 100-7 | 11 mins, 16 secs | Cherry, yellow spots and cap |
| Second | Hall Court | Captain Arthur Tempest | 11-0 | 50-1 | A head | Scarlet, white sash and cap |
| Third | Emblematic | George Stevens | 11-10 | 5-1 | A distance | Brown, light blue cap |
| Fourth | Mistake | Bill Jarvis | 10-8 | 100-1 | | Lilac and white stripes, white cap |
| Fifth | Merrimac | Ben Land | 11-4 | 33-1 | | Black, white sleeves, black cap |
| Fence 27 {Final Hurdle} | Flyfisher | J. Riddell | 11-12 | 100-1 | Pulled Up, walked in 6th | Orange, black cap |
| Fence 27 {Final Hurdle} | Emblem | William Walters | 12-4 | 100-8 | Pulled Up | Brown, yellow cap |
| Fence 27 {Final Hurdle} | Lightheart | J. Monahan | 10-12 | 20-1 | Pulled Up | Pink, white sash and cap |
| Fence 27 {Final Hurdle} | Philosopher | E. Jones | 10-8 | 100-1 | Pulled Up | Red and black hoops, white cap |
| Fence 23 {Valentines Brook} | The Czar | Alec Goodman | 10-0 | 20-1 | Fell | Red, white sash and cap |
| Fence 19 {Becher's Brook} | Arbury | Charles Boyce | 11-8 | 100-8 | Fell | Red, yellow and blue striped sleeves, black cap |
| Fence 19 {Bechers Brook} | Stanton | George Waddington | 10-8 | 9-1 | Refused | Green, white braid and cap |
| Fence 18 {Rails & Ditch} | Ballycasey | Barton | 11-0 | 100-1 | Fell | Orange, blue cap |
| Fence 17 {Double Rails} | Princess Dagmar | George Holman | 10-12 | 100-8 | Pulled Up | Buff, blue sleeves, black cap |
| Fence 17 {Double Rails} | Tony Lumpkin | Tommy Pickernell | 10-4 | 100-7 | Pulled Up | Light blue, white cap |
| Fence 16 {Ditch & Bank} | Joe Maley | Johnny Page | 11-10 | 100-12 | Fell | Blue, white sleeves, blue cap |
| Fence 16 {Ditch & Bank} | Meanwood | James Knott | 11-9 | 50-1 | Pulled Up | Lime, black cap |
| Fence 15 {Ditch} | The Dwarf | Pat Igoe | 10-0 | 25-1 | Pulled Up | Pink, white sash and cap |
| Fence 15 {Ditch} | Express | Digby Collins | 11-6 | 100-1 | Pulled Up | black and white stripes, blue cap |
| Fence 15 {Ditch} | Freshman | Dan Meaney | 10-10 | 40-1 | Pulled Up | |
| Fence 1 {Ditch} | Acrobat | George Ede | 11-9 | 50-1 | Refused to start | White, blue cap |
| Fence 1 {Ditch} | Market Gardner | Tom Spence | 10-0 | 100-1 | Refused | Black, yellow and red stripes and hooped cap |
| Fence 1 {Ditch} | Tumbler | Drake | 10-6 | 100-1 | Refused, continued tailed off, pulled up Fence 14 | Pink, black sleeves and cap |
