= 1886 Grand National =

English steeplechase horse race

- Grand National
- Location: Aintree
- Date: 26 March 1886
- Winning horse: Old Joe
- Starting price: 25/1
- Jockey: Tommy Skelton
- Trainer: George Mulcaster
- Owner: Capt. Arthur Johnstone-Douglas (Scotland)
- Conditions: Good to soft

The 1886 Grand National was the 48th renewal of the Grand National horse race that took place at Aintree Racecourse near Liverpool, England, on 26 March 1886.

== Finishing Order ==
Position	Name	Jockey	Handicap (st-lb)	SP	Distance
01	Old Joe	Tom Skelton	10-9	25-1	6 Lengths
02	Too Good	Harry Beasley	11-12	7-1	
03	Gamecock	Bill Stephens	10-12	50-1	
04	Magpie	William Woodland	10-5	200-1	
05	The Badger	Arthur Nightingall	10-3	25-1	
06	Coronet	John Lee-Barber	10-7	3-1	
07	Cortolvin	Bill Dollery	11-2	50-1	
08	Lady Tempest	Willie Beasley	10-5	22-1	Last to Complete

== Non-finishers ==
Fence	Name	Jockey	Handicap (st-lb)	SP	Fate
21	Roquefort	Ted Wilson	12-3	5-1	Fell
01	Frigate	John Jones	11-13	9-1	Fell
?	Redpath	George Lambton	11-7	100-6	?
25	Jolly Sir John	Chris Waller	11-6	40-1	Fell
?	Black Prince	William Nightingall	10-12	50-1	?
23	Billet Doux	J Behan	10-11	100-1	Pulled Up
26	The Liberator	S. Woodland jr.	10-10	100-1	Fell
18	Belmont	J. Westlake	10-10	33-1	Fell
?	Harristown	J Purcell	10-7	66-1	?
07	Fotenoy	Johnny Page	10-4	200-1	Refused
03	Sinbad	Arthur Hall	10-3	25-1	Fell
30	Savoyard	G Kirby	10-3	22-1	Fell
22	Limekiln	William? Brockwell	10-2	?	Fell
?	Amicia	Frank Cotton	10-0	25-1	?
03	Conscript	Henry Escott	10-0	100-1	Fell
