= Bill Cammeyer =

William Henry Cammeyer (March 20, 1821 – September 4, 1898) was a businessman who was a pioneer in the early days of Major League Baseball. He was the owner of the New York Mutuals franchise and managed the team during the 1876 season. He also built the Union Grounds ballpark for the Mutuals.

Cammeyer was born in New York City, but he moved to Williamsburg, Brooklyn in 1849. His father was a leather merchant, and upon his father's death, Cammeyer inherited his father's business. It was the profits from this enterprise which enabled him to finance the construction of the Union Grounds, which opened in 1862.. He had a wife, and they had seven children; four daughters, and three sons. Cammeyer died in his home, located at 44 Macon Street in Brooklyn.
