= 1896 in sports =

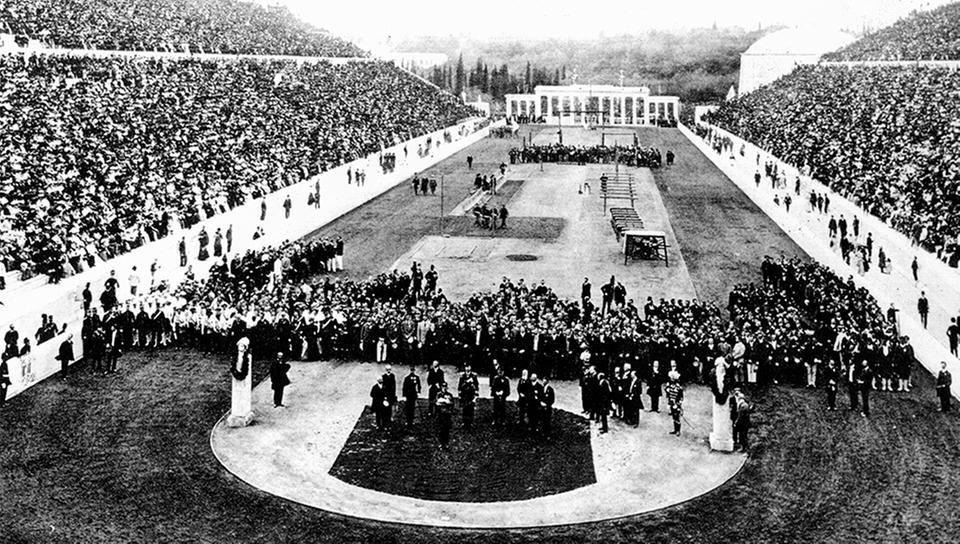
1896 Olympics opening ceremony

1896 in sports describes the year's events in world sport.

== Athletics ==
- USA Outdoor Track and Field Championships
- March 22 - Greek runner Charilaos Vasilakos wins the first modern marathon (3:18)

== American football ==
College championship

- College football national championship – Princeton Tigers

Professional championships

- Western Pennsylvania champions – Allegheny Athletic Association

== Association football ==
Canada

- March 15 - The Newfoundland Football League is founded.
- March 19 - The Manitoba Football Association is founded.

England

- The Football League – Aston Villa 45 points, Derby County 41, Everton 39, Bolton Wanderers 37, Sunderland 37, Stoke FC 30
- FA Cup final – The Wednesday 2–1 Wolverhampton Wanderers at Crystal Palace, London.

Scotland

- Scottish Football League – Celtic
- Scottish Cup final – Hearts 3–1 Hibernian at Logie Green

== Australian Rules Football ==
- Victorian Football Association premiers - Collingwood
- SANFL premiers - South Adelaide
- WAFL premiers - Fremantle

== Baseball ==
National championship

- Baltimore Orioles win the third of three successive National League championships

Events

- Temple Cup – Baltimore Orioles 4–0 Cleveland Spiders

== Boxing ==
- 10 March - After Bob Fitzsimmons KOs much larger Jim Corbett to win world HW championship he says, The bigger they are, the harder they fall

Lineal world champions

- World Heavyweight Championship – James J. Corbett
- World Middleweight Championship – title vacant
- World Welterweight Championship – Tommy Ryan
- World Lightweight Championship – vacant → George "Kid" Lavigne
- World Featherweight Championship – George Dixon
- World Bantamweight Championship – Jimmy Barry

== Canadian Football ==
- Ontario Rugby Football Union - University of Toronto
- Quebec Rugby Football Union - Ottawa College
- Manitoba Rugby Football Union - St John's
- Northwest Championship - Winnipeg
- Dominion Championship - Ottawa College defeats the University of Toronto 12-8

== Cricket ==
Events

- England retain The Ashes, defeating Australia 2–1 in a three-match series. In a low-scoring decider at The Oval, England win by 66 runs.

England

- County Championship – Yorkshire
- Minor Counties Championship – Worcestershire
- Most runs – K S Ranjitsinhji 2780 @ 57.91 (HS 171*)
- Most wickets – J T Hearne 257 @ 14.28 (BB 9–73)
- Wisden Five Cricketers of the Season – Syd Gregory, Dick Lilley, K S Ranjitsinhji, Tom Richardson, Hugh Trumble

Australia

- Sheffield Shield – New South Wales
- Most runs – Harry Donnan 626 @ 69.55 (HS 160)
- Most wickets – Tom McKibbin 46 @ 23.86 (BB 8–93)

India

- Bombay Presidency – Europeans shared with Parsees

South Africa

- Currie Cup – not contested

West Indies

- Inter-Colonial Tournament – not contested

== Figure skating ==
Events

- Inaugural World Figure Skating Championships (open to men only) is held in Saint Petersburg

World Figure Skating Championships

- World Men's Champion – Gilbert Fuchs (Germany)

== Golf ==
Major tournaments

- British Open – Harry Vardon (the first of Vardon's six British Open titles)
- U.S. Open – James Foulis

Other tournaments

- British Amateur – Freddie Tait
- US Amateur – H. J. Whigham

== Horse racing ==
England

- Grand National – The Soarer
- 1,000 Guineas Stakes – Thais
- 2,000 Guineas Stakes – St. Frusquin
- The Derby – Persimmon
- The Oaks – Canterbury Pilgrim
- St. Leger Stakes – Persimmon

Australia

- Melbourne Cup – Newhaven

Canada

- Queen's Plate – Millbrook

Ireland

- Irish Grand National – Royston Crow
- Irish Derby Stakes – Gulsalberk

USA

- Kentucky Derby – Lieut. Gibson
- Preakness Stakes – Margrave
- Belmont Stakes – Hastings

== Ice hockey ==
- 14 February — the Winnipeg Victorias defeat the Montreal Victorias 2–0 in a challenge match to win the 1896 Stanley Cup championship
- 7 March — the Montreal Victorias are the 1896 AHAC season champions.
- March — Queen's University defeats Stratford, Ontario 12–3 to win the Ontario Hockey Association (OHA) title. The club does not challenge Winnipeg.
- 17 November — the Western Pennsylvania Hockey League, which later became the first ice hockey league to openly trade and hire players, began play at Pittsburgh's Schenley Park Casino.
- 17 December — the Schenley Park Casino, which was the first multi-purpose arena with the technology to create an artificial ice surface in North America as well as the home to the Western Pennsylvania Hockey League, was destroyed in a fire.
- 30 December — the Montreal Victorias defeat the Winnipeg Victorias 6–5 in a challenge match to regain the Stanley Cup

== Motor racing ==
Paris-Marseille-Paris Trail

- The 1896 Paris–Marseille–Paris Trail is held over 1710 km from 24 September to 3 October and won by Émile Mayade driving a Panhard-Levassor 8 hp model in a time of 67:42:58. The race is in retrospect sometimes referred to as the II Grand Prix de l'ACF.

== Olympic Games ==
1896 Summer Olympics

- The 1896 Summer Olympics, the first modern Games, takes place in Athens with 13 nations competing, the most competitors coming from Greece, Germany and France.
- 16 April — American James Connolly wins the triple jump to become the first Olympic champion in over 1,500 years.
- Winners receive a silver medal and a crown of olive branches; Greece wins the most medals (46) and the United States wins the most gold medals (11).

== Rowing ==
The Boat Race

- 28 March — Oxford wins the 53rd Oxford and Cambridge Boat Race
- There is no Harvard–Yale Regatta during "a breakdown in relations between the two schools". From the third Race in 1859, the only exceptions outside major wars are 1871 and 1896.

== Rugby league ==
Events

- In the 1895–96 Northern Rugby Football Union season's final match, Manningham defeats Halifax to claim the inaugural Rugby Football League Championship.
- The inaugural Rugby League Challenge Cup competition begins in the 1896–97 season.

England

- Championship – Manningham
- Lancashire League Championship – Runcorn
- Yorkshire League Championship – Manningham

== Rugby union ==
Home Nations Championship

- 14th Home Nations Championship series is won by Ireland

== Skiing ==
- The foundation of the Ski-Club of Grenoble by Henry Duhamel.

== Speed skating ==
Speed Skating World Championships

- Men's All-round Champion – Jaap Eden (Netherlands)

== Tennis ==
England

- Wimbledon Men's Singles Championship – Harold Mahony (Ireland) defeats Wilfred Baddeley (GB) 6–2 6–8 5–7 8–6 6–3
- Wimbledon Women's Singles Championship – Charlotte Cooper Sterry (GB) defeats Alice Simpson-Pickering (GB) 6–2 6–3

France

- French Men's Singles Championship – André Vacherot (France) defeats Gérard Brosselin (France) 6–1 7–5

USA

- American Men's Singles Championship – Robert Wrenn (USA) defeats Fred Hovey (USA) 7–5 3–6 6–0 1–6 6–1
- American Women's Singles Championship – Elisabeth Moore (USA) defeats Juliette Atkinson (USA) 6–4 4–6 6–2 6–2
