= 1873 in sports =

1873 in sports describes the year's events in world sport.

== American football ==
College championship

- College football national championship – Princeton Tigers

Events

- 19 October — representatives of Yale Bulldogs, Columbia Lions, Princeton Tigers and Rutgers Scarlet Knights meet at the Fifth Avenue Hotel in New York City to codify the first set of intercollegiate football rules.

== Association football ==
England

- FA Cup final – The Wanderers 2–0 Oxford University at Lillie Bridge in London

Scotland

- 13 March — formation of the Scottish Football Association (SFA). Queen's Park and Third Lanark are among the original members.
- The Scottish Football Association Challenge Cup, commonly known as the Scottish Cup, is launched by the Scottish Football Association as a knockout cup competition ahead of the 1873–74 season.

== Australian rules football ==
Events

- St Kilda Football Club established.

== Baseball ==
National championship

- National Association of Professional Base Ball Players champion – Boston Red Stockings (second consecutive season)

== Boxing ==
Events

- 23 September — Tom Allen becomes the undisputed Heavyweight Champion of America when he defeats Mike McCoole in the 7th round at "Chateau Island" near St. Louis, Missouri.
- 29 October — McCoole is arrested and later convicted for shooting another pugilist called Patsy Mavery at St. Louis. This ends his career.
- 18 November — Allen defends his title against Ben Hogan at Pacific City, Iowa. In the 3rd round, Hogan claims a foul but is refused by the referee. A riot erupts and the bout is forced to end, being declared a draw. Allen retains the American Championship but does not fight again until 1876.

== Canadian football ==
Events

- Toronto Argonauts founded by the Argonaut Rowing Club

== Cricket ==
Events

- Player qualification rules are introduced with players having to decide at the start of a season whether they will play for their county of birth or their county of residence. Until now, it has been quite common for a player to play for two counties during the course of a single season. Increasing media interest in county cricket enables a semi-official championship to be inaugurated, based on media consensus.

England

- Champion County – Gloucestershire shares the title with Nottinghamshire
- Most runs – W. G. Grace 1805 @ 72.20 (HS 192*)
- Most wickets – James Southerton 148 @ 13.96 (BB 8–113)

== Golf ==
Major tournaments

- British Open – Tom Kidd

== Horse racing ==
Events

- Inaugural running of the Preakness Stakes is won by Survivor

England

- Grand National – Disturbance
- 1,000 Guineas Stakes – Cecilia
- 2,000 Guineas Stakes – Gang Forward
- The Derby – Doncaster
- The Oaks – Marie Stuart
- St. Leger Stakes – Marie Stuart

Australia

- Melbourne Cup – Don Juan

Canada

- Queen's Plate – Mignonette

Ireland

- Irish Grand National – Torrent
- Irish Derby Stakes – Kyrle Daly

USA

- Preakness Stakes – Survivor
- Belmont Stakes – Springbok

== Rowing ==
The Boat Race

- 29 March — Cambridge wins the 30th Oxford and Cambridge Boat Race

== Rugby football ==
Events

- 3 March — formation of the Scottish Rugby Football Union in a meeting held at Glasgow Academy, Elmbank Street, Glasgow. Eight clubs are represented at the foundation: Glasgow Academicals; Edinburgh Academical Football Club; West of Scotland F.C.; University of St Andrews Rugby Football Club; Royal High School FP; Merchistonians; Edinburgh University and Glasgow University.
- Gloucester RFC, Halifax, Hawick RFC, Salford RLFC, St Helens R.F.C., Wakefield Trinity RLFC and Widnes RLFC all established in 1873.
