= 1883 in sports =

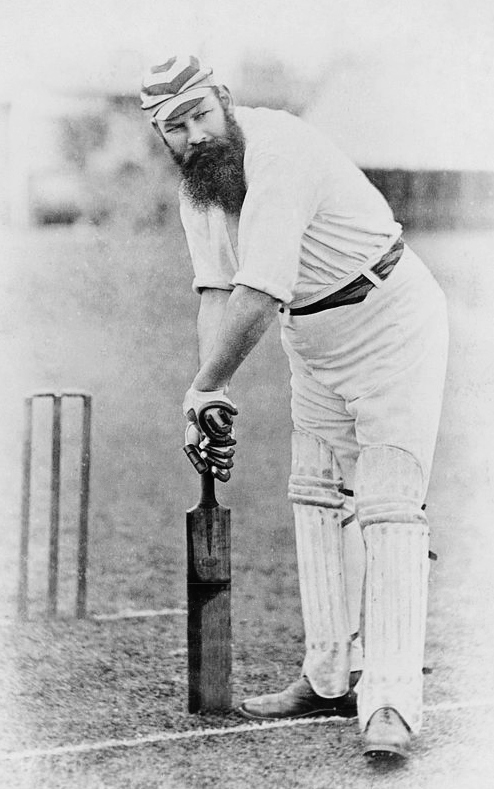
W G Grace taking guard in 1883

1883 in sports describes the year's events in world sport.

== Athletics ==
- USA Outdoor Track and Field Championships

== American football ==
College championship

- College football national championship – Yale Bulldogs

Events

- Modification of the scoring rules produces a system of four points for a touchdown, two points for kicks after touchdowns, two points for safeties, and five for field goals.

== Association football ==
England

- FA Cup final – Blackburn Olympic 2–1 Old Etonians (aet). This is the first time that the FA Cup is won by a professional team and by a team from the north of England.
- Burnley FC moves to its present ground at Turf Moor and plays its first game there in February against Rawtenstall, but loses 6–3.
- Bristol Rovers founded as Black Arabs FC.

Scotland

- Scottish Cup final – Dumbarton 2–1 Vale of Leven (replay following 2–2 draw)

Australia

- Balgownie Rangers, the oldest existing Australian soccer club, is founded.
- An inter-colonial game is played between Victoria and New South Wales at East Melbourne Cricket Ground

== Baseball ==
National championship

- National League v. American Association – Boston Beaneaters (NL) v. Philadelphia Athletics (AA) cancelled

Events

- The NL, AA, and Northwestern League limit competition in the Tripartite Agreement, the first National Agreement and the birth of so-called "Organised Baseball".
- 6 September — Chicago White Stockings set a still standing record for Major League Baseball by scoring 18 runs in a single inning (the 7th) in a game against the Detroit Wolverines.

== Boxing ==
Events

- American heavyweight champion John L. Sullivan has a scare when he is knocked down in the first round of his fight against Charley Mitchell in New York City. He recovers to secure a technical knockout when police intervene after the third round and stop the fight. Sullivan goes on tour across America, fighting mainly in exhibition bouts; none of his genuine challengers last more than three rounds.

== Canadian Football ==
- Canadian Football still closely resembles rugby union at this point in its history. A field goal is worth 6 points, a try 4, a safety 2 points and a kick to the deadline and a rouge are both worth 1.
- Both the Ontario and Quebec Rugby Football Unions are founded. Montreal wins the inaugural season of the Quebec competition, while Toronto wins its Ontario counterpart.

== Cricket ==
Events

- England tours Australia to play a Test series of three matches, England winning 2–1 and so regaining The Ashes for the first time.

England

- Champion County – Nottinghamshire
- Most runs – Walter Read 1,573 @ 47.66 (HS 168)
- Most wickets – Ted Barratt 148 @ 15.90 (BB 8–28)

Australia

- Most runs – Alec Bannerman 434 @ 54.25 (HS 101*)
- Most wickets – Eugene Palmer 51 @ 11.52 (BB 7–65)

== Golf ==
Major tournaments

- British Open – Willie Fernie

== Horse racing ==
England

- Grand National – Zoedone
- 1,000 Guineas Stakes – Hauteur
- 2,000 Guineas Stakes – Galliard
- The Derby – St. Blaise
- The Oaks – Bonny Jean
- St. Leger Stakes – Ossian

Australia

- Melbourne Cup – Martini-Henry

Canada

- Queen's Plate – Roddy Pringle

Ireland

- Irish Grand National – The Gift
- Irish Derby Stakes – Sylph

USA

- Kentucky Derby – Leonatus
- Preakness Stakes – Jacobus
- Belmont Stakes – George Kinney

== Ice hockey ==
- The first Montreal Winter Carnival ice hockey tournament is held as part of the Montreal Winter Carnival in Montreal, Quebec, Canada in late January and early February. It is the first championship ice hockey tournament and is won by the Montreal McGill University team.
- 5 March – The Ottawa Hockey Club is founded.

== Luge ==
Events

- First organised competition takes place in Davos, Switzerland

== Rowing ==
The Boat Race

- 15 March — Oxford wins the 40th Oxford and Cambridge Boat Race

== Rugby football ==
Home Nations Championship

- The inaugural series is won by England

Other events

- Foundation of Hull Kingston Rovers and Hunslet

== Tennis ==
England

- Wimbledon Men's Singles Championship – William Renshaw (GB) defeats Ernest Renshaw (GB) 2–6 6–3 6–3 4–6 6–3

USA

- American Men's Singles Championship – Richard D. Sears (USA) defeats James Dwight (USA) 6–2 6–0 9–7

World

- The 7th pre-open era 1883 Men's Tennis tour gets underway 30 tournaments are staged this year from 24 April to 12 November.
