= Jimmy Elliott =

Irish boxer

Personal information
- Nickname: none
- Nationality: Irish
- Born: Jimmy Elliott; 1838 Athlone, Ireland
- Died: March 1, 1883 (aged 44–45) Chicago, Illinois
- Weight: Heavyweight

Boxing career

Jimmy Elliott (1838, Athlone, Ireland – March 1, 1883) was an Irish-American boxer who was Heavyweight Champion of the World from 1865 to 1868. On December 12, 1870 Elliott was arrested and convicted of highway robbery and assault with intent to kill. He was sentenced to sixteen years and ten months at the Eastern State Penitentiary in Philadelphia. He was released early in the spring of 1879 due to an eye disease. On March 1, 1883, a gambler by the name of Jere Dunn shot Elliott in a Chicago saloon. He died shortly after.
