= 1880 men's tennis season =

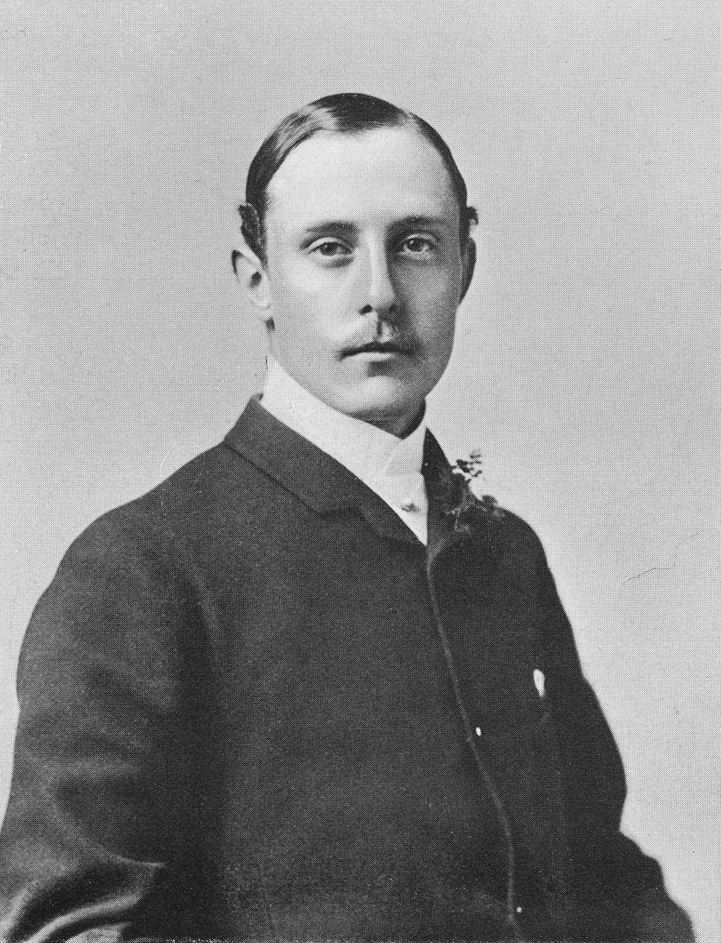
- William Renshaw shared the most titles this year.

Details
- Duration: 12 April – 28 November
- Tournaments: 44 (Amateur)
- Categories: Important (4); National (2); Provincial/Regional/State (2); County (4); Local (32)

Achievements (singles)
- Most titles: (United Kingdom) Dale Womersley (2) (United Kingdom) Edward Brackenbury (2) (United Kingdom) William Renshaw (2)
- Most finals: (United Kingdom) Otway E. Woodhouse (2) (United Kingdom) William Renshaw (2)

The 1880 men's tennis season incorporated 44 tournaments staged in Australia, Great Britain and Ireland and the United States. The 1880 Wimbledon Championships was won by John Hartley against Herbert Lawford, in the Challenge Round.

The season began in April Cheltenham, England and ended in October in Boston, Massachusetts, United States.

== Calendar ==
Notes 1: Challenge Round: the final round of a tournament, in which the winner of a single-elimination phase faces the previous year's champion, who plays only that one match. The challenge round was used in the early history of tennis (from 1877 through 1921), in some tournaments not all.

* Indicates challenger

Notes 2:Tournaments in italics were events that were staged only once that season

Key

Important.
National
Provincial/State/Regional
County
Local

=== January to March ===
No events

=== April ===
Date	Tournament	Winner	Finalist	Semifinalist	Quarter finalist
12–18 April	East Gloucestershire Championships Cheltenham, Great Britain; Hard; Singles	(United Kingdom of Great Britain and Ireland) Ernest Renshaw; 6-2 3-6 6-1 8-6	(Ireland) Ernest Browne		

=== May ===
Date	Tournament	Winner	Finalist	Semifinalist	Quarterfinalist
10–16 May	Northern Championships; Manchester, Great Britain; Grass; Singles - Doubles	(United Kingdom) Richard Taswell Richardson; 6-0 6-3 6-0	(United Kingdom) Walter Edwin Fairlie	(United Kingdom) Cecil Francis Parr (United Kingdom) John Ravenscroft	(United Kingdom) J Bayly (United Kingdom) J Clarke (United Kingdom) John Comber (United Kingdom) W L Agnew
24 May-28 May	Irish Lawn Tennis Championships; Dublin, Ireland; Grass; Singles - Doubles	(England) William Renshaw; 6-1 6-4 6-3	(Ireland) Ernest Browne	(Ireland) Michael G. McNamara	(United Kingdom) S. D. Maul (United Kingdom) A. J. Mullholland
24 May-28 May	Irish Lawn Tennis Championships; Dublin, Ireland; Grass; Singles - Doubles	Challenge round (Ireland) Vere St. Leger Goold		(Ireland) Michael G. McNamara	(United Kingdom) S. D. Maul (United Kingdom) A. J. Mullholland

=== June ===
Date	Tournament	Winner	Finalist	Semifinalist	Quarter finalist
4-6 Jun.	Devon and Cornwall Archery Society Lawn Tennis Tournament; Manadon, Plymouth, England; Grass; Singles - Doubles	(United Kingdom of Great Britain and Ireland) William Bertie Roberts; 6-0, 6-1	(United Kingdom of Great Britain and Ireland) Mr. Montagu	(United Kingdom of Great Britain and Ireland) Mr. Keate	(United Kingdom of Great Britain and Ireland) Mr. O'Brien (United Kingdom of Great Britain and Ireland) Mr. Luxmore
26 June.	Essex County Cricket Club Tournament; County Cricket Ground; Brentwood, Essex, England; Grass; Singles	(United Kingdom of Great Britain and Ireland) Dale Womersley; 2 sets to 0	(United Kingdom of Great Britain and Ireland) R.C. Ball	(United Kingdom of Great Britain and Ireland) Nalton Womersley	(United Kingdom of Great Britain and Ireland) Barrington Henry Syer Barnes (United Kingdom of Great Britain and Ireland) J.G. Fowler (United Kingdom of Great Britain and Ireland) J. Read
14–26 June	Kemptown Tournament; Kemptown, Brighton, Great Britain ? Singles	(United Kingdom of Great Britain and Ireland) Arthur Oldham Jennings; 6-3 6-3 4-6 6-4	(United Kingdom of Great Britain and Ireland) Thomas Jenner Verrall		
24–25 June. (Note: The Leicester Lawn Tennis Club Tournament was founded in 1878 until 1879 In 1880 it was called the Leicester Open Lawn Tennis Tournament. In 1881 it became an open tournament the Leicester Open Tennis Tournament. In 1900 it became the Leicestershire County Lawn Tennis Championships. The club also shared the staging of the Leicestershire County Championships with other venues.)	Leicester Lawn Tennis Club Tournament; Aylestone Park; Leicester, Great Britain ? Singles	(United Kingdom of Great Britain and Ireland) Stuart Macrae; 6-5 4-6 6-4	(United Kingdom of Great Britain and Ireland) Champion Branfill Russell	(United Kingdom of Great Britain and Ireland) Harold Baird Carlyon (United Kingdom of Great Britain and Ireland) E.C. Keele	(United Kingdom of Great Britain and Ireland) H.F. Johnson (United Kingdom of Great Britain and Ireland) Arthur Thomas Toller (England) Dr John Thomas Jacques (United Kingdom of Great Britain and Ireland) George de Horne Vaizey
21 June-4 July	Princes Club Championships Prince's Club, London, Great Britain; Grass; Singles	(United Kingdom of Great Britain and Ireland) Herbert Lawford; 5-7 5-7 6-3 6-0 8-6	(United Kingdom) Edgar Lubbock	(United Kingdom of Great Britain and Ireland) Otway E, Woodhouse (United Kingdom of Great Britain and Ireland) Herbert Lawford	(United Kingdom) Captain Blane (United Kingdom) David Charles Heatley (United Kingdom) O E Woodhouse

=== July ===
Date	Tournament	Winner	All comers' finalist	Semifinalist	Quarterfinalist
5 June–3 July.	Worcester Park Challenge Cup; Worcester, England ?	(United Kingdom) F. Durant; 6-0, 8–6, 9-7	(United Kingdom) E. Johnson	(United Kingdom) Frederick Chetwynd-Stapylton (United Kingdom) A.C. Waddilove	(United Kingdom) H.W. Horne (United Kingdom) W.R. Price (United Kingdom) Edward Chetwynd-Stapylton
12 July.	Championship of the Esher LTC. Esher Lawn Tennis Club; Esher, Surrey, England ?	(United Kingdom) Clement Edward Cottrell ?	(United Kingdom) ?		
16 July.	Woodford Parish Championship; County Cricket Ground; Woodford Parish, England; Grass; Singles	(United Kingdom) Edward North Buxton; 2 sets to 0	(United Kingdom); R.C. Ball		
7–16 July	Wimbledon Championship; London, Great Britain; Grass; Singles	(United Kingdom) John Hartley walkover	(United Kingdom) Otway E. Woodhouse	(United Kingdom) George Butterworth (United Kingdom) G. M. Montgomeries	(United Kingdom) Richard Ridley Farrer (United Kingdom) William Henry Darby D'Esterre (United Kingdom) H.C. Jenkins (United Kingdom of Great Britain and Ireland) Ernest Renshaw
7–16 July	Wimbledon Championship; London, Great Britain; Grass; Singles	Challenge round (United Kingdom of Great Britain and Ireland) Herbert Lawford		(United Kingdom) George Butterworth (United Kingdom) G. M. Montgomeries	(United Kingdom) Richard Ridley Farrer (United Kingdom) William Henry Darby D'Esterre (United Kingdom) H.C. Jenkins (United Kingdom of Great Britain and Ireland) Ernest Renshaw
15 - 17 July. (Note: The St. Leonards-On-Sea tournament was staged from 1880 to 1891 on grass courts, it featured players such as Joshua Pim and Herbert Wilberforce.)	St Leonards-on-Sea Tournament; Archery Gardens; St Leonards-on-Sea, England; Grass; Singles - Doubles	(United Kingdom) R. Stuart Wilson; 7-5, 6-2	(United Kingdom) Arthur Wellesley Soames	(United Kingdom) F.A. Coles	
15 - 18 July.	County Galway LTC Tournament; Lisbeg, County Galway, Ireland; Grass	(Ireland) Ernest Browne ?	(Ireland) John Eyre	(Ireland) W. Aldridge	(United Kingdom of Great Britain and Ireland) Edmond Bennet Brackenbury (England) James Parsons Dove
20 July.	North Northamptonshire LTC Tournament; Drayton Park; Lowick, Northamptonshire; Grass; Singles; Doubles	(United Kingdom of Great Britain and Ireland) W.H. Collins ?	(United Kingdom) G.H. Evans	(United Kingdom of Great Britain and Ireland) H.O. Hall	(United Kingdom of Great Britain and Ireland) A. Ashby (United Kingdom of Great Britain and Ireland) F.M. Eden (United Kingdom of Great Britain and Ireland) B. Clarke-Thornhill
21-26 July.	Staffordshire County Cricket Club Lawn Tennis Tournament. Lichfield, Great Britain; Grass; Singles	(United Kingdom) Jonas Henry William Gardner; 6-4 6-3	(United Kingdom) J. H. Forster	(United Kingdom) C.W.A. Law	(United Kingdom) William Arthur Briscoe (United Kingdom) L.G. Knight
28-31 July	County Kildare Tournament; Naas, Ireland; Singles - Doubles	(Ireland) Joseph R. Rainsford; 6-1 6-4 6-3	(Ireland) Jacob R. Sherrard	(Ireland) Joseph R. Rainsford (Ireland) Algernon Ambrose Michael Aylmer	(Ireland) Horrace Kennedy (Ireland) Ivor Kirkpatrick (Ireland) Thomas Browning Reeves (Ireland) R. D. Vincent

=== August ===
Date	Tournament	Winner	Finalist	Semifinalist	Quarter finalist
August.	Blackmoor Vale LTC Tournament; Sherborne School Cricket Ground; Sherborne, Blackmoor Vale, Dorset, England; Grass	(United Kingdom) Sir Hubert James Medlycott ?	(United Kingdom) B. Portman	(England) Rev. Montague Hankey	(United Kingdom) G. Dendy (United Kingdom) A.C. Cole (United Kingdom) J.C. Fox
? August	Scottish Championships; St Andrews, Great Britain; Wood (i); Singles	(United Kingdom) James Patten McDougall def	(Scotland) Leslie Balfour-Melville		
2 – 3 August.	Ripon Club Tournament; Ripon, LTC, Cricket Field; Ripon, North Yorkshire, England; Grass	(United Kingdom) A.R. Springett ?	(United Kingdom) Northing Pinckney Snowden	(United Kingdom) J. Walker (United Kingdom) T.F. Wilson	(United Kingdom) C. Bickerstelle (United Kingdom) R. Paley (United Kingdom) W. Paley (United Kingdom) A.J. Wise
19 August.	Mersey Bowmen Archery Club Tournament; The Mersey Bowmen Archery Club; Sefton Park, Liverpool, England; Grass	(United Kingdom) H.F. Rooke ?	(United Kingdom) H. Duranty	(United Kingdom) L.J. Kilgour	(United Kingdom) J.R. Holme (United Kingdom) Mr. Isaacson (United Kingdom) Mr. Stewart
16–19 August	Waterford Tournament; Waterford, Ireland; Grass; Singles	(Ireland) Vere St. Leger Goold; 6-1 6-2	(Ireland) Frederick William Knox; Def	(Ireland) Robert Hassard	(Ireland) Arthur Bourke (Ireland) G. Butler
16–24 August	Devonshire Park Championships; Eastbourne, Great Britain; Grass	(United Kingdom) Dale Womersley	(United Kingdom of Great Britain and Ireland) Frederick Brunning Maddison def.	(United Kingdom) C.H.P. Carter William C. Taylor	(United Kingdom) G. Palmer (United Kingdom) Herbert Henley Playford (United Kingdom) Nalton Womersley
17–21 August	South of Ireland Championships Limerick, Ireland; Grass; Singles	(England) Edward Brackenbury; 6-4 6-4 6-2	(Ireland) Edward Montiford Longfield	(Ireland) William Dawson (Ireland) Samuel Martin Gully	(Ireland) G Burton (Ireland) James F J Heffernan Considine (Ireland) Major Henry H Goodeve (Ireland) William Dawson
17–21 August	Limerick CC Lawn Tennis Tournament; Limerick, Ireland; Grass	(England) Edward Brackenbury; 6-4 6-4 6-2	(Ireland) Edward Lysaght	(Ireland) Samuel Martin Gully	(Ireland) Heffernan Considine (Scotland) Charles A Mc Donald (Ireland) Major Henry H Goodeve
21 - 28 August.	Langley Marish Tournament; Langley Marish LTC; Langley Marish, Berkshire, England; Grass	(United Kingdom) C. O. Phipps; 6-5, 3–6, 6-3	(United Kingdom) Zachary Hubert Nash	(United Kingdom) Rev. J. Swire	(United Kingdom) J.N. Hardcastle | (United Kingdom) Thomas Arthur Nash
23–24 August. (Note: The Torquay Tennis Tournament was staged from 1880 to 1974 on grass courts.)	Torquay Lawn Tennis Tournament; Torquay Cricket Ground; Torquay, Great Britain; Grass; Singles	(England) Ernest Maconchy; 6-0 6-0	(United Kingdom) C. Hughes	(United Kingdom) C. Hughes (United Kingdom) T. B. Hughes	(Ireland) Thomas Arembery Tombe (United Kingdom of Great Britain and Ireland) Owen Gould
30 August.	Bedfordshire LTC Tournament; Beds LTC; Fairfield, Bedfordshire, England; Grass	(United Kingdom) Robert James Lindsell ?	(United Kingdom) Frederick Willis	(United Kingdom) Augustus Scobell Orlebar	(United Kingdom) J. Hughes (United Kingdom) S. Mellor

=== September ===
Date	Tournament	Winner	Finalist	Semifinalist	Quarterfinalist
September.	Brighton Lawn Tennis Club Tournament; Brighton Lawn Tennis Club; Queen's Park, Brighton, East Sussex, England; Grass	(United Kingdom) H. Stanley; 6-4, 6–3, 6-5	(United Kingdom) Francis Henry Izard	(United Kingdom) Sir Arthur Oldham Jennings	(United Kingdom) A.W. Bailey (United Kingdom) F.O. Bax-Ironside
September.	Ealing Cricket Club Lawn Tennis Tournament; Ealing Cricket Club; Ealing, Middlesex, England; Grass	(United Kingdom) F.W. Rawson; 3 sets to 0	(United Kingdom) Alfred Penn Gaskell	(United Kingdom) Mr. Baker (United Kingdom) C.J. Wilkinson	(United Kingdom) A.R. Atkinson (United Kingdom) Mr. St. Clair (United Kingdom) W. Hervey (United Kingdom) M. Sharpe
1 - 2 Sept.	Armagh Lawn Tennis Tournament; Archery Lawn Tennis Club; Armagh, Ireland; Asphalt; Singles - Doubles	(Ireland) Robert Baron Templer ?	(Ireland) Robert Shaw Templer	(Ireland) J.C. Hibbert	(Ireland) E. Obré (Ireland) E.J. Wolfe
1 - 3 September. (Note: The Teignmouth and Shaldon tournament was staged from 1880 to 1937. From 1880 to 1884 was held on Asphalt courts then changed to grass courts.)	Teignmouth and Shaldon Open; Teignmouth Tennis Club; Teignmouth, England; Grass; Singles - Doubles	(England) Ernest William Stuart King Maconchy ?	(United Kingdom) W.B. Young	(United Kingdom) H. Hayes	(United Kingdom) Sir Stephen Montagu Burrows (England) George Campbell Maconchy (Ireland) Thomas Arembery Tombe
4 September. (Note: The Shanklin tournament was staged from 1880 to 1931)	Shanklin LTC Tournament; Shanklin, Isle of Wight, England; Grass; Singles - Doubles	(England) Algernon Hay Lushington ?	(United Kingdom) P. Hewitt	(United Kingdom) C.A. White	(United Kingdom) O. Borrodaile (United Kingdom) A. Spicer
1–5 September	Championship of America; Staten Island Cricket and Baseball Club; Staten Island, United States; Grass; Singles	(United Kingdom) Otway E. Woodhouse; 54-50 (games)	(Canada) Isidore F. Hellmuth	(United States) Edward H. Gray (United States) C.M. Harvey	(United States) C. W. Barnes (United States) Walter M Wood (United States) William Larned (United States) W H Davidge
24 - 25 September.	Truro LTC Open Tournament; Truro Cricket Grounds; Truro, Cornwall, England; Grass	(United Kingdom) Mr. Casey; 3 sets to 0	(United Kingdom) William Ewart Beamish Barter	(United Kingdom) Dr.F. Collins (United Kingdom) P.A. Derry	(Portugal) José Ricardo Grylls d'Almeida (United Kingdom) H.D. Foster (United Kingdom) L. Milne (England) George Tallack Petherick
28 September.	Bosmere Lawn Tennis Club Tournament; Bosmere, LTC; Creeting Rectory, Creeting St Mary, Suffolk, England; Grass	(United Kingdom) J.M. Wilkinson ?	(United Kingdom) George Algernon Draffen	(United Kingdom) A. Downes	(United Kingdom) E.R. Durnford (United Kingdom) H. Gaye (United Kingdom) Mr. Smythe

=== October ===
Date	Tournament	Winner	Finalist	Semifinalist	Quarterfinalist
30 September - 1 October.	Bournemouth CLTC Autumn Tournament; Bournemouth CLTC; Dean Park Cricket Ground; Bournemouth, England; Grass; Singles - Doubles	(United Kingdom) Francis Robert (Frank) Benson; 6-1, 6–1, 6-3	(United Kingdom) F.A. Campbell		
4–10 October	Sussex County Lawn Tennis Tournament; Brighton, Great Britain; Grass; Singles - Doubles	(United Kingdom of Great Britain and Ireland) William Renshaw; 6-3 6-3	(United Kingdom of Great Britain and Ireland) Ernest Renshaw	(United Kingdom) Robert Bradell (United Kingdom) William H Darby	(United Kingdom) Frederick Bunning (United Kingdom) H C Goddart (United Kingdom) H E Eaton (United Kingdom) William H Darby
4 October.	Dirleton Castle LTC Tournament; Dirleton Castle, LTC; Dirleton, East Lothian, Scotland ? Singles - Doubles	(Scotland) Rev. J. Kerr; 2 sets to 1	(United Kingdom) A.M. Bell		
6 - 11 October.	Henley Lawn Tennis Club Tournament; Henley Lawn & Tennis Club; Henley-on-Thames, Oxfordshire, England ?	(United Kingdom) E. Bayly; 1-6, 6–1, 12-10	(United Kingdom) W.H. Browning		
7 - 14 October.	Savernake Forest LTC Tournament; Savernake Forest, LTC, S.F.C.C. Ground; Savernake, Wiltshire England ?	(Ireland) George Rawdon Maurice Hewson ?	(United Kingdom) Mr. Dunning	(United Kingdom) Edward Beaumont Cotton Curtis (United Kingdom) Thomas Curtis	(United Kingdom) Rev. F. Carre (United Kingdom) Rev. M.R. Edmeades (United Kingdom) Mr. Hunter (United Kingdom) H. Tootell
11–17 October	Beacon Park Open; Boston, United States; Grass	(United States) Richard Sears; Def	(United States) Edward Gray		

=== November ===
Date	Tournament	Winner	Finalist	Semifinalist	Quarterfinalist
22–28 November	Victorian Championships (Autumn); Melbourne, Australia; Hard; Singles - Doubles	(Australia) Frank Highett walkover	(England) Edward Wallington	(Australia) R P Arnold (Australia) William McEvoy	(Australia) C W Butler (Australia) E Silvester (Australia) R Barton (Australia) William McEvoy

=== December ===
No events

== Tournament winners ==
Note:List is alphabetical by first name and Important tournaments in bold

- (United Kingdom) A.R. Springett—Ripon—(1)
- (England) Algernon Hay Lushington—Shanklin—(1)
- (United Kingdom) Arthur Oldham Jennings—Kemptown-(1)
- (United Kingdom) C. O. Phipps—Langley Marish—(1)
- (United Kingdom) Clement Edward Cottrell—Esher—(1)
- (United Kingdom) Dale Womersley—Brentwood, Eastbourne—(2)
- (United Kingdom) E. Bayly—Henley—(1)
- (England) Edward Brackenbury—Limerick, Limerick II—(2)
- (United Kingdom) Edward North Buxton—Woodford Parish—(1)
- (Ireland) Ernest Browne—Lisbeg—(1)
- (England) Ernest Maconchy—Teignmouth, Torquay—(2)
- (England) Ernest Renshaw—Cheltenham—(1)
- (United Kingdom) F. Durant—Worcester—(1)
- (United Kingdom) F.W. Rawson—Ealing—(1)
- (United Kingdom) Francis Benson—Bournemouth—(1)
- (Australia) Frank Highett-Melbourne—(1)
- (Ireland) George Rawdon Maurice Hewson—Savernake—(1)
- (United Kingdom) H. Stanley—Brighton (Queens Park)—(1)
- (United Kingdom) H.F. Rooke—Liverpool—(1)
- (Scotland) Herbert Lawford, **Princes Club Championships**—(1)
- (United Kingdom) Hubert James Medlycott–Sherbourne—(1)
- (United Kingdom) J.M. Wilkinson—Creeting St, Mary—(1)
- (Scotland) James Patten McDougall—St. Andrews—(1)
- (United Kingdom) John Hartley—**Wimbledon Championship**—(1)
- (United Kingdom) Jonas Henry William Gardner—Lichfield—(1)
- (Ireland) Joseph Rainsford—Naas—(1)
- (United Kingdom) Mr. Casey—Truro—(1)
- (United Kingdom) Otway E. Woodhouse—Staten Island—(1)
- (United Kingdom) R. Stuart Wilson–St Leonards-on-Sea—(1)
- (Scotland) Rev. J. Kerr—Dirleton—(1)
- (United States) Richard Sears—Boston—(1)
- (United Kingdom) Richard Taswell Richardson—**Northern Championships**—(1)
- (Ireland) Robert Baron Templer—Armagh—(1)
- (United Kingdom) Robert James Lindsell—Fairfield—(1)
- (United Kingdom) Stuart Macrae—Leicester—(1)
- (Ireland) Vere St. Leger Goold—Waterford—(1)
- (United Kingdom) W.H. Collins—Lowick—(1)
- (United Kingdom) William Bertie Roberts—Plymouth—(1)
- (England) William Renshaw—Brighton, **Irish Lawn Tennis Championships**—(2)

== See also ==
- 1880 in sports

== Sources ==
- A Social History of Tennis in Britain: Lake, Robert J. (2014), Volume 5 of Routledge Research in Sports History. Routledge, UK, ISBN 9781134445578.
- Ayre's Lawn Tennis Almanack And Tournament Guide, 1908 to 1938, A. Wallis Myers.
- British Lawn Tennis and Squash Magazine, 1948 to 1967, British Lawn Tennis Ltd, UK.
- Dunlop Lawn Tennis Almanack And Tournament Guide, G.P. Hughes, 1939 to 1958, Dunlop Sports Co. Ltd, UK
- Fein, Paul (2003). Tennis confidential : today's greatest players, matches, and controversies. Washington, D.C.: Potomac Books. ISBN 978-1574885262.
- Lawn tennis and Badminton Magazine, 1906 to 1973, UK.
- Lowe's Lawn Tennis Annuals and Compendia, Lowe, Sir F. Gordon, Eyre & Spottiswoode
- Spalding's Lawn Tennis Annuals from 1885 to 1922, American Sports Pub. Co, USA.
- Sports Around the World: History, Culture, and Practice, Nauright John and Parrish Charles, (2012), ABC-CLIO, Santa Barbara, Cal, USA, ISBN 1598843001.
- The Concise History of Tennis, Mazak Karoly, (2010), 6th Edition, 2015.
- Tennis; A Cultural History, Gillmeister Heiner, (1997), Leicester University Press, Leicester, UK.
- The Tennis Book, edited by Michael Bartlett and Bob Gillen, Arbor House, New York, 1981 ISBN 0-87795-344-9
- The World of Tennis Annuals, Barrett John, 1970 to 2001.
- Total Tennis:The Ultimate Tennis Encyclopedia, by Bud Collins, Sport Classic Books, Toronto, Canada, ISBN 0-9731443-4-3
- Wright & Ditson Officially Adopted Lawn Tennis Guide's 1890 to 1920 Wright & Ditsons Publishers, Boston, Mass, USA.
- http://www.tennisarchives.com/
- https://thetennisbase.com/
