= 1880 women's tennis season =

Details
- Duration: May 1880 – October 1880
- Edition: 5th
- Tournaments: 13
- Categories: National (1); Regional (1); County (1); Regular (10)

Achievements (singles)
- Most titles: 7 women won one title each
- Most finals: 7 women reached final each

1880 Women's Tennis season was mainly composed of national, regional, county, local regular amateur tournaments. This year, 13 tennis events for women were staged, one in India, three of them in Ireland and nine events in England between May and October 1880.

== Season summary ==
The women's amateur tennis seasons covers a period of thirty five years from 1876 to 1912. During this period there was no single international organization responsible for overseeing tennis. At the very start in tennis history lawn tennis clubs themselves organized events and some like the All England Lawn Tennis and Croquet Club in England (f.1877) and the Fitzwilliam Lawn Tennis Club, Ireland (f.1879) generally oversaw tennis in their respective countries.

This would later change when tennis players started (those that could) traveled the world to compete in events organized by individual national lawn tennis associations (NLTA)'s the oldest of which then was the United States Lawn Tennis Association (f. 1881). In certain countries that did not establish a national association until later, had provincial, regional or state lawn tennis associations overseeing tournaments in a province, region or state within a country, such as the Northern Lawn Tennis Association in Manchester, England (f.1880), had responsibility for coordinating tournaments staged by clubs in the North of England region. In Australia the Victorian Lawn Tennis Association (f.1904) organised tournaments in the state of Victoria, Australia.

In 1880 twelve tournaments for women were staged four of them in Ireland, and nine of them in England. In the spring in May the second Irish Championships are held this was the first major national championships in the world to feature not only a women's singles event won by a D. Meldon, but also a ladies doubles event, and a mixed doubles event. In August the Armagh Tennis Tournament is staged at the Archery Lawn Tennis Club, Armagh that features a mixed doubles event. In India at the close of May the Calcutta Cricket Club (f.1792), inaugurated an open lawn tennis tournament that featured 21 entries.

In June two tournaments are held featuring women's events. At the Devon and Cornwall Archery Society Tournament held at Manadon , Plymouth, Devon, England a mixed doubles event is won by Miss Keate and Mr. A. Radcliffe. From June 14 to 22 the Kemptown Tournament was staged at Kemptown, Brighton, East Sussex, England that featured a ladies doubles event, that was won by two sister Miss Adshead and Miss. Eva Adshead, this event was notable in that this match was played over five sets. On 16 August the fourth annual Waterford Lawn Tennis Tournament was begun. On July 1 the Mersey Bowmen Archery Club Tournament began at Sefton Park, Aigburth in Liverpool, England, however it was not concluded until August 19. On August 16 the Devonshire Park Lawn Tennis Club began the Devonshire Park Championships at Eastbourne, England. Between 16 and 17 August the Mount's Bay Archery and Lawn tennis Clubs staged a two-day Mount's Bay Lawn Tennis Tournament at Mount's Bay. Penzance, Cornwall, England, the ladies singles being won by Miss. Jackson and the gentleman's singles by Mr. H. H. Ley of Truro.

In September 1880 the fifth edition of South of Ireland Championships in Limerick the singles event was won by Annie Rice. The same month the Ealing Cricket Club staged its first Ealing Cricket Club Lawn Tennis Tournament, that was to feature a mixed pairs event won by Blanche Bingley. On 16 September the second Saint Leonards-on-Sea Tournament began at the Archery Gardens, St Leonards-on-Sea, Hastings, East Sussex, England that ended on 18 September. On 24 September the Truro LTC Tournament commenced at Truro, in Cornawall, England. On 1 October 1880 the Sussex County Lawn Tennis Tournament that began on 26 September concluded. At this time 'open' tournaments usually meant men's and women's players can compete.

At the 1880 Wimbledon Championships the world's first major tennis tournament, it still remained an all men's event, no women's events were staged. By 1881 for women there was a tennis circuit of sorts starting to form.

In 1913 the International Lawn Tennis Federation was created, that consisted of national member associations. The ILTF through its associated members then became responsible for supervising women's tour events.

== Results ==
Notes 1: Challenge Round: the final round of a tournament, in which the winner of a single-elimination phase faces the previous year's champion, who plays only that one match. The challenge round was used in the early history of tennis (from 1877 through 1921), in some tournaments not all.

* Indicates doubles ** mixed doubles

Notes 2:Tournaments in italics were events that were staged only once that season

Key

Main events
National events
Provincial/Regional/State
County events
Regular events

=== January to April ===
No events

=== May ===
Ended	Tournament	Winner	Finalist	Semi Finalist	Quarter Finalist
28 May	Irish Championships; Fitzwilliam Lawn Tennis Club; Dublin, County Dublin, Ireland; Outdoor; Grass/Asphalt; Singles	(Ireland) D. Meldon; 6-1, 6-1	(Ireland) Connie Butler	(Ireland) May Langrishe (Ireland) Miss Lynch	
28 May	Irish Championships; Fitzwilliam Lawn Tennis Club; Dublin, County Dublin, Ireland; Outdoor; Grass/Asphalt; Singles	(Ireland) Connie Butler * (Ireland) May Langrishe default	(Ireland) Miss Anderson (Ireland) Miss Costello	(Ireland) May Langrishe (Ireland) Miss Lynch	
28 May	Irish Championships; Fitzwilliam Lawn Tennis Club; Dublin, County Dublin, Ireland; Outdoor; Grass/Asphalt; Singles	(Ireland) Miss Costello ** (Ireland) Spencer D. Maul; 6-4, 7-5	(Ireland) D. Meldon (Ireland) Robert Hassard	(Ireland) May Langrishe (Ireland) Miss Lynch	
31 May	Calcutta Cricket Club Open; Calcutta Cricket Club; Calcutta, West Bengal, India, England; Grass; Singles - Doubles	? ?			

=== June ===
Ended	Tournament	Winner	Finalist	Semifinalist	Quarter finalist
5 June	Devon and Cornwall Archery Society Lawn Tennis Tournament; Devon and Cornwall Archery Society Club; Manadon, Plymouth, Devon, England; Grass; Singles - Doubles	(United Kingdom) Miss Keate ** (United Kingdom) A. Radcliffe; 2 sets to 1	(United Kingdom) Miss F. Fitzroy (United Kingdom) Algernon Aylmer		
22 June	Kemptown Tournament; Kemptown, Brighton, East Sussex, England; Grass; Singles - Doubles	(United Kingdom) Miss Adshead (United Kingdom) Eva Adshead; 6-1, 4–6, 3–6, 6–2, 6-3			

=== July ===
No events

=== August ===
Ended	Tournament	Winner	Finalist	Semifinalist	Quarter finalist
16 August	Mount's Bay Lawn Tennis Tournament; Mount's Bay Archery & Lawn Tennis Club; Cricket Ground; Mount's Bay, Penzance, Cornwall, England; Grass; Singles - Doubles	(United Kingdom) Miss. Jackson def	(United Kingdom) Miss Chard		
19 August	Waterford Tournament; Waterford Cricket Club; Waterford, Munster, Ireland; Grass; Singles - Doubles	(Ireland) May Langrishe; 6–5, 6-0	(Ireland) D. Meldon		
21 August	South of Ireland Championships; Limerick, County Limerick, Ireland; Outdoor; Grass; Singles	(Ireland) Miss Smith >	(Ireland) ?		
19 August	Mersey Bowmen Archery Club Tournament; Mersey Bowmen Archery Club; Sefton Park, Aigburth, Liverpool, Lancashire, England; Grass; Singles - Doubles	(United Kingdom) Miss. Scott ** (United Kingdom) Mr. H.F. Rooke def	(United Kingdom) Miss Maitland (United Kingdom) Mr. H. Duranty		
24 August	Devonshire Park Championships; Devonshire Park Lawn Tennis Club; Eastbourne, East Sussex, England; Grass; Singles - Doubles	(United Kingdom) Miss. Spreckley ** (United Kingdom) Dale Womersley; 2 sets to 0	(United Kingdom) Miss Alexander (United Kingdom) Mr. Taylor		

=== September ===
Ended	Tournament	Winner	Finalist	Semi Finalist	Quarter Finalist
4 September	Ealing Cricket Club Lawn Tennis Tournament; Ealing, Middlesex, England; Outdoor; Grass; Singles	(United Kingdom) Blanche Bingley ** (United Kingdom) F.W. Rawson; 2 sets to 0	(United Kingdom) Miss Baker (United Kingdom) M. Sharpe		
18 September	Saint Leonards-on-Sea Tournament; Archery Gardens; St Leonards-on-Sea; Hastings, East Sussex, England; Outdoor; Grass; Singles	(England) Miss Augusta Langley; 6-4, 6-4	(England) Miss Flora Langley		
25 September	Truro LTC Open Tournament; St Leonards-on-Sea; Hastings, East Sussex, England; Outdoor; Grass; Singles	(England) Mrs Casey ** (England) Mr. Casey def	(England) Miss Paul (England) Dr. F. Collins		

=== October ===
Note: The Sussex County tournament was the autumn edition of the event that featured a women's competition.

Ended	Tournament	Winner	Finalist	Semi Finalist	Quarter Finalist
1 October	Sussex County Lawn Tennis Tournament (Autumn); Hove Rink Tennis Courts; Brighton, East Sussex, England; Outdoor; Grass; Singles	(England) Ellen Maltby; 6–3, 6-3	(England) Mary Ann Maltby		

=== November to December ===
No events

== Tournament winners ==
=== Singles ===
This is list of winners sorted by number of singles titles (# and main titles in bold)

- (Ireland) D. Meldon (**1**) Dublin
- (Ireland) May Langrishe (**1**) Waterford
- (United Kingdom) Miss Adshead (**1**) Kemptown
- (England) Miss Ellen Maltby (**1**) Brighton
- (Ireland) Miss Smith (**1**) Limerick
- (United Kingdom) Miss Jackson (**1**) Penzance
- (England) Miss Augusta Langley (**1**) St Leonards-on-Sea

=== Doubles ===
This is list of winners sorted by number of doubles titles (# and main titles in bold)

- (Ireland) Connie Butler & (Ireland) May Langrishe (**1**) Dublin
- (United Kingdom) Miss Adshead & (United Kingdom) Miss. Eva Adshead (**1**) Kemptown

=== Mix doubles ===
This is list of winners sorted by number of mixed doubles titles (# and main titles in bold)

- (Ireland) Miss Costello & (Ireland) Spencer D. Maul (**1**) Dublin
- (United Kingdom) Miss. Spreckley & (United Kingdom) Dale Womersley (**1**) Eastbourne
- (United Kingdom) Blanche Bingley & (United Kingdom) F.W. Rawson (1) Ealing
- (United Kingdom) Miss. Scott & (United Kingdom) Mr. H.F. Rooke (**1**) Liverpool
- (United Kingdom) Miss Keate & (United Kingdom) A. Radcliffe (**1**) Plymouth
- (England) Mrs. Casey & (England) Mr. Casey (**1**) Truro
