= Amateur boxing =

Type of boxing

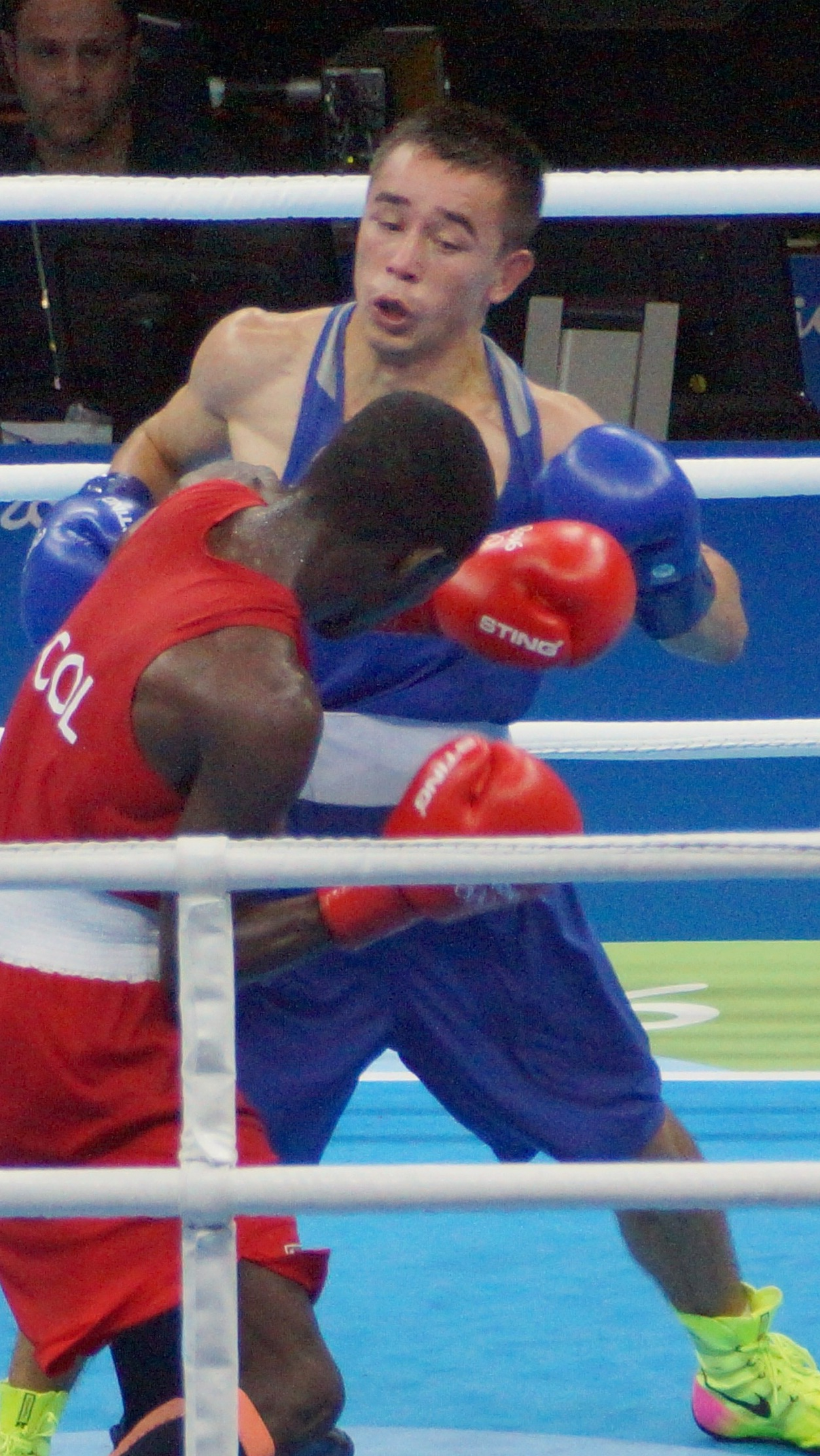
Boxers wear shorts and sleeveless singlets or jerseys; red outfit for the higher-ranked contender, blue for the lower-ranked.

Amateur boxing is the variant of boxing practiced in clubs and associations around the world, at the Olympic Games, Pan American Games and Commonwealth Games, as well as at the collegiate level.

Amateur boxing bouts comprise three rounds of three minutes, with a one-minute interval between rounds, for men and women. Men's senior bouts changed in format from four two-minute rounds to three three-minute rounds on January 1, 2009. Women's senior bouts changed in format from four two-minute rounds to three three-minute rounds on December 19, 2016. Amateur boxing rewards point-scoring blows, based on the number of clean punches landed, rather than physical power. Also, the amateur format allows tournaments to feature several bouts over several days, unlike professional boxing, where fighters typically rest several months between bouts.

A referee monitors the fight to ensure that competitors use only legal blows; a belt worn over the torso represents the lower limit of punches – any boxer repeatedly landing "low blows" is disqualified. Referees also ensure that the boxers do not use holding tactics to prevent the opponent from punching. (If this occurs, the referee separates the opponents and orders them to continue boxing. Repeated holding can result in a boxer being penalized, or ultimately, disqualified.) Referees have to stop the bout if a boxer is seriously injured, or if one boxer is significantly dominating the other.

Amateur boxing is sometimes called Olympic-style boxing (now an official term), although this is not to be confused with boxing at the Summer Olympics, where boxers compete under the amateur rules but can be both amateurs and professionals.

== History ==
=== Early beginnings ===
Amateur boxing emerged as a sport during the mid-to-late 19th century, partly as a result of the moral controversies surrounding professional prize-fighting. Originally lampooned as an effort by upper and middle-class gentlemen to co-opt a traditionally working class sport, the safer, "scientific" style of boxing found favour in schools, universities and in the armed forces, although the champions still usually came from among the urban poor.

=== Development ===
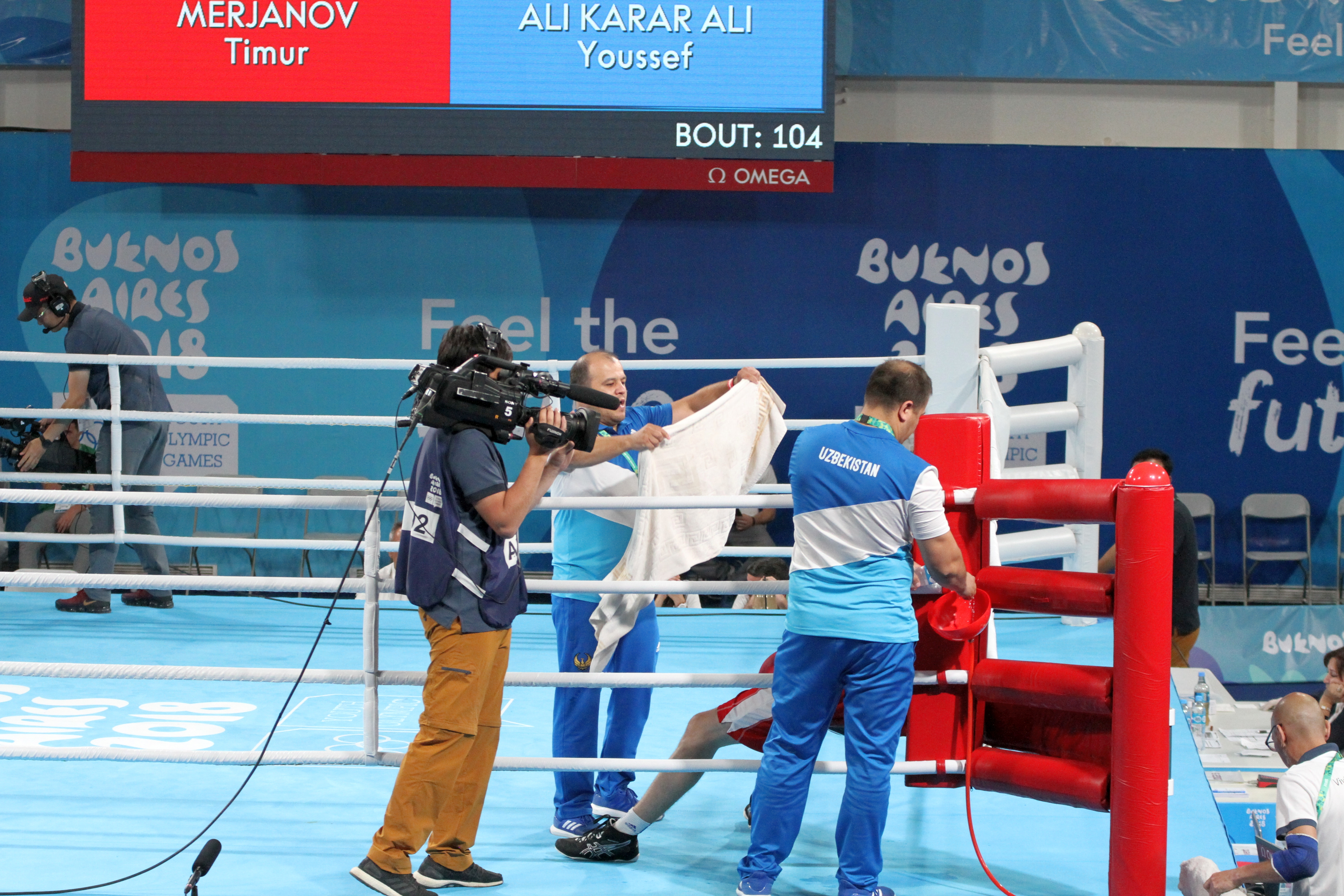
Contemporary amateur boxing events are often broadcast live.

The Queensberry Amateur Championships continued from 1867 to 1885, and so, unlike their professional counterparts, amateur boxers did not deviate from using gloves once the Queensberry Rules had been published. In England, the Amateur Boxing Association (A.B.A.) was formed in 1880 when twelve clubs affiliated. It held its first championships the following year. Four weight classes were contested: Featherweight (9 stone), Lightweight (10 stone), Middleweight (11 stone, 4 pounds) and Heavyweight (no limit). (A stone is equal to 14 pounds.) By 1902, American boxers were contesting the titles in the A.B.A. Championships, which, therefore, took on an international complexion. By 1924, the A.B.A. had 105 clubs in affiliation.

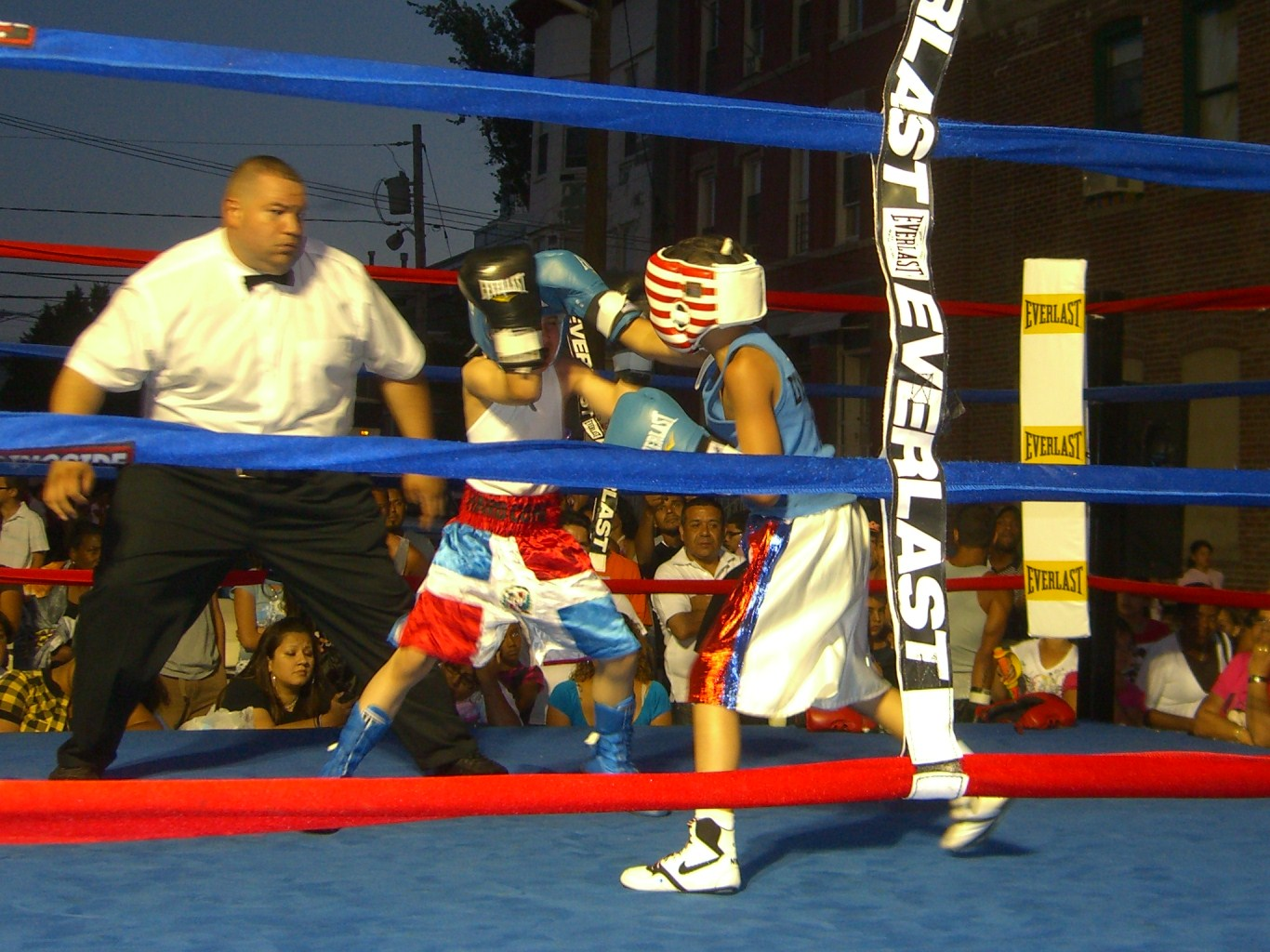
A child boxing exhibition in Union City, New Jersey

Boxing first appeared at the Olympic Games in 1904 and, apart from the Games of 1912, has always been part of them. From 1904 to 2020, the United States and Cuba won the most gold medals; 50 for the U.S. (117 overall) and 41 (78 overall) for Cuba.

Internationally, amateur boxing spread steadily throughout the first half of the 20th century, but when the first international body, the Fédération Internationale de Boxe Olympique (International Olympic Boxing Federation) was formed in Paris in 1920, there were five member nations. In 1946, when the International Amateur Boxing Association (A.I.B.A.) was formed in London, twenty-four nations from five continents were represented, and the A.I.B.A. continued to be the official world federation of amateur boxing the following decades. The first World Amateur Boxing Championships were staged in 1974, prior to that only regional championships took place, the only worldwide event apart from the Olympics were World Military Boxing Championships first conducted in 1947 and ever since by the CISM.

=== Results ===
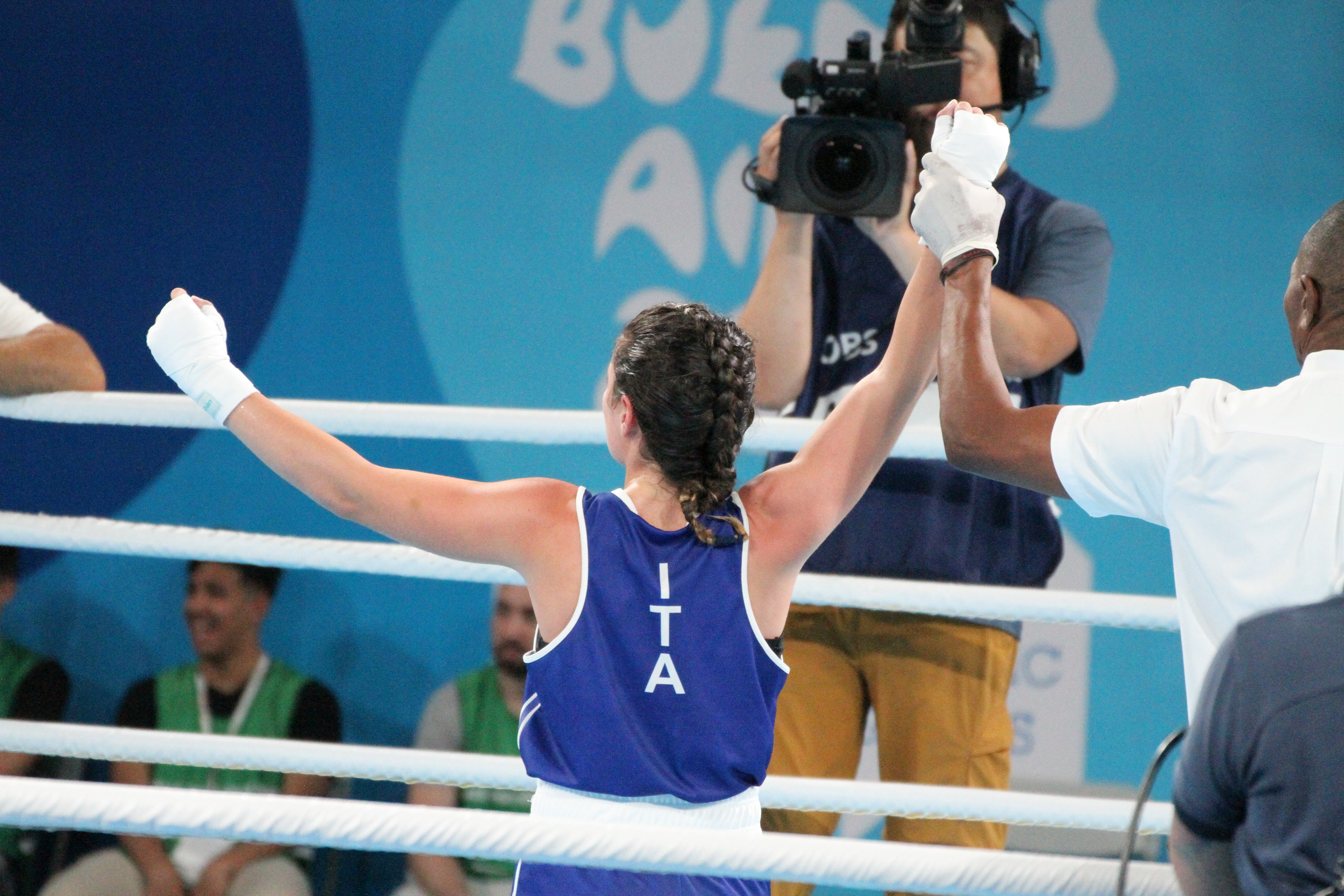
Amateur boxing matches typically ending with referee raising the winner's hand

Bouts which end this way may be noted in English or in French (which was the AIBA official language). Amateur boxing does not recognize terms "knockout", and "technical knockout", instead it use the following terms:

Abbreviation		Meaning	Professional boxing equivalent
English	French	Meaning	Professional boxing equivalent
RSC	kot	referee stops contest (unspecified)	technical knockout
RSCO		referee stops contest for an outclassed opponent	technical knockout
RSCOS		referee stops contest for an outscored opponent	technical knockout
RSCH		referee stops contest due to hard blows to the head	technical knockout
RSCM		referee stops contest for medical reasons	referee technical decision
RSCI		referee stops contest due to injury	referee technical decision
RET	AB	corner retirement or quitting	referee technical decision
KO	ko	boxer on the canvas for ten seconds	Knockout
PTS	pts	points decision	Points decision
DQ	disq	disqualification	Disqualification
WO	forfeit	walkover, a victory by default (due to an opponent's absence)	no contest
Bye		round bypass	no competition

All wins, losses, or mismatches except for those achieved by way of a clean knockout, or in absentia, are disputable, and could be contested legally through an appeal to the governing bodies.

=== Scoring ===
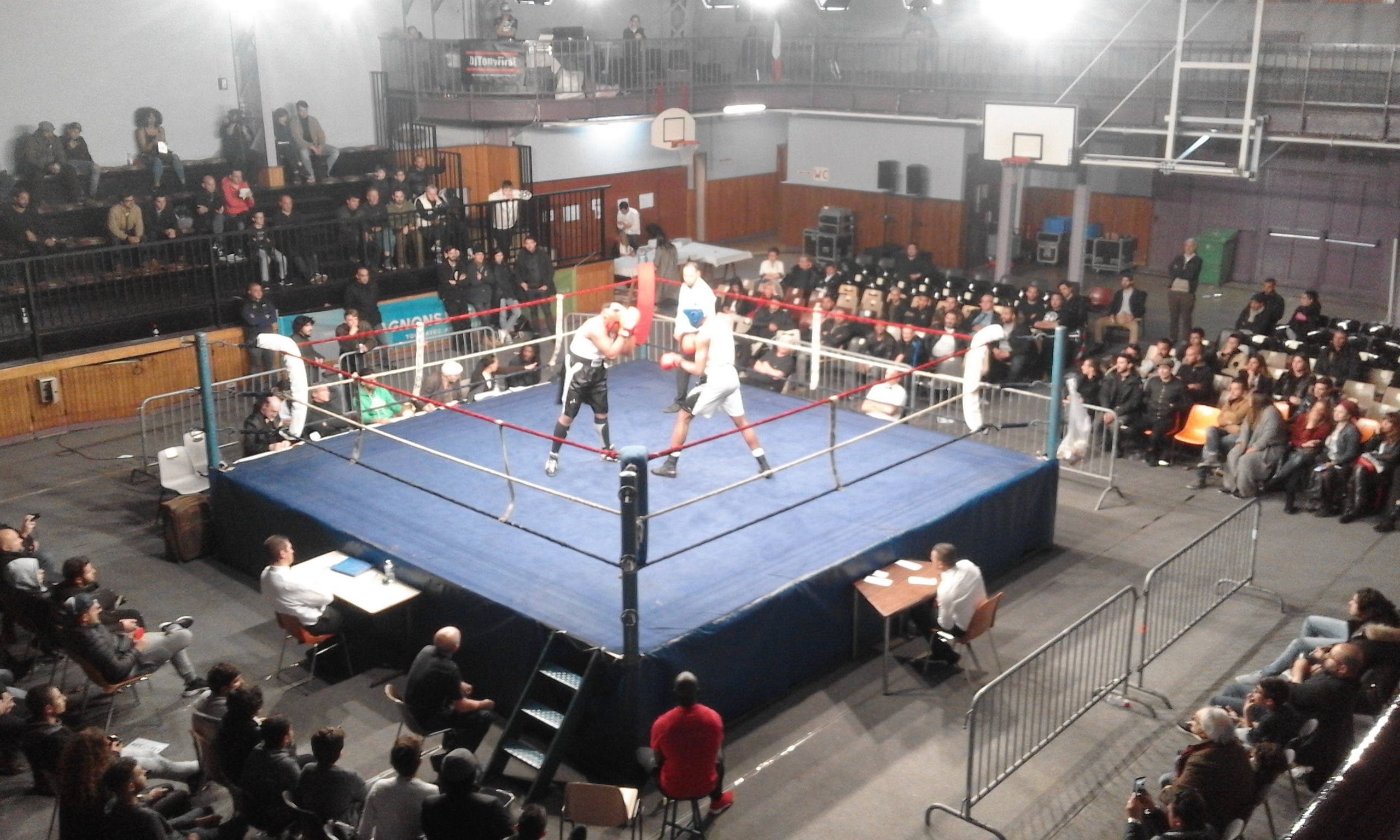
Traditional judging system, with four judges ringside, at each side of the ring, and one judge in the ring (also being a referee of the match)

Amateur boxing to this day have several scoring systems, depending on the tournament regulations and sanctioning authority. Several archaic score systems, that survived to the 1980s (and in some places to this day), the first of which is a 3-point system, which gave one point for each of three rounds (therefore 3–0 stands for a clean victory by points, 2–1 means that defeated opponent dominated one round, 1–1–1 stands for a draw or ex aequo, which was a very rare occurrence). It coexisted for a long time with 3-vote decision system, and 5-vote decision system, which resembled professional boxing decision-making system, it took five judges voting either for victory or a draw (in the 5-vote system, 5–0 stands for unanimous decision, 4–1 for majority decision, 3–2 for split decision, 3–1–1 for split decision and one judge ruled a draw. In the 3-vote system, 3–0 stands for unanimous decision, 2–1 for split decision, 0–0–3 for a draw, with no majority decision option). Depending on the tournament regulations an extra round or rounds could be appointed on the sudden death principle if there was no clear winner. All mentioned systems were practised in combination with each other (i.e. judges were supposed not only to pick up a winner, but also to fill-in scorecards), creating complexity with points, scorecards, etc. Tournaments and championships usually employed the 5-vote system. International duals usually employed the 3-vote system, with two judges represented the guest nation, and one judge represented the host nation. Both systems lead to a number of controversial and officially contested results, as punch statistics (thrown-to-landed) mostly wasn't accounted for by either one. At the 1960 Rome Olympics preliminaries, after Soviet Oleg Grigoryev was controversially ruled a winner over Great Britain's Francis Taylor, the IOC decided to relieve some 15 of the referees and judges of their duties before the quarterfinals. After the 1988 Seoul Olympics controversy, when the clearly dominant finalist Roy Jones Jr. of the U.S. (whom even the Soviet judges ruled to be a winner, let alone the commentators and his beaten opponent, who himself apologized for the injustice) was virtually robbed of the gold medal, a new system was created and implemented, where only clean punches score, although a controversy still exist as to what is a clean punch in one's personal opinion, leading to another dubious results. The semifinals of the 1996 Atlanta Olympics proved the new points system susceptible to controversy as well, when Kazakhstani Vassiliy Jirov was pronounced a 15–9 score winner over U.S. Antonio Tarver, with many observers were left confused, believing Tarver was dominant through the entire bout.

Scoring system	Decision options			
Scoring system	Unanimous decision	Majority decision	Split decision	Draw (in rarest cases)
5-vote decision	5–0	4–1	3–2	2–2–1, 2–1–2, or 1–1–3
3-vote decision	3–0	none	2–1	1–1–1 or 0–0–3
Points decision	none	none	none	in case of both score equal

Computer scoring was introduced to the Olympics in 1992. Each of the five judges had a keypad with a red and a blue button. The judges pressed a button for which ever corner they felt landed a scoring blow. Three out of the five judges had to press the button for the same boxer within a one-second window in order for the point to score. A legal scoring blow was that which is landed cleanly with the knuckle surface of the glove, within the scoring area from the middle of the head, down the sides and between the hips through the belly button. In case of a tied match, each judge would determine a winner.

The AIBA introduced a new scoring system in January 2011. Each judge gives an individual score for each boxer. The score given to each boxer would be taken from 3 out of 5 judges either by similar score or trimmed mean. Scores are no longer tracked in real time and are instead given at the end of each round.

On March 13, 2013, the computer scoring system was abandoned, with amateur boxing instead using the ten point must system, similar to professional boxing.

=== Awards ===
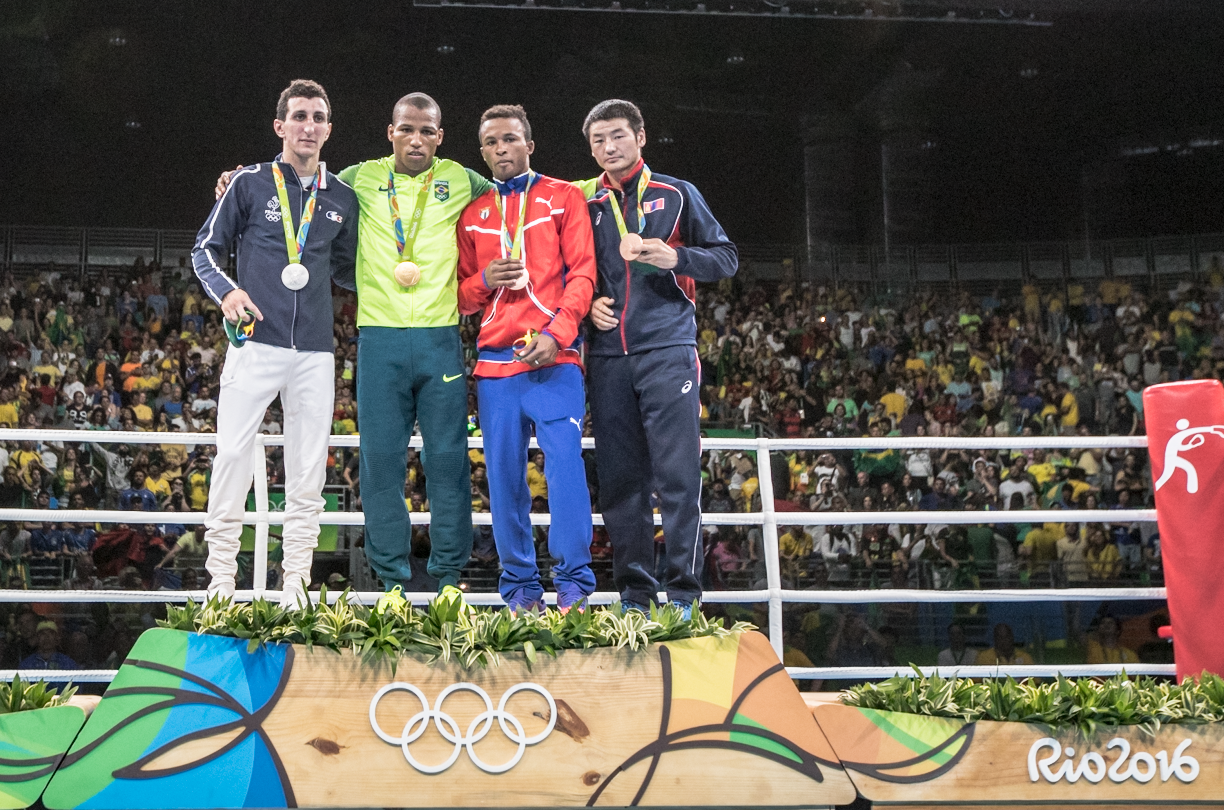
2nd and 3rd place at the amateur championships are also prized.

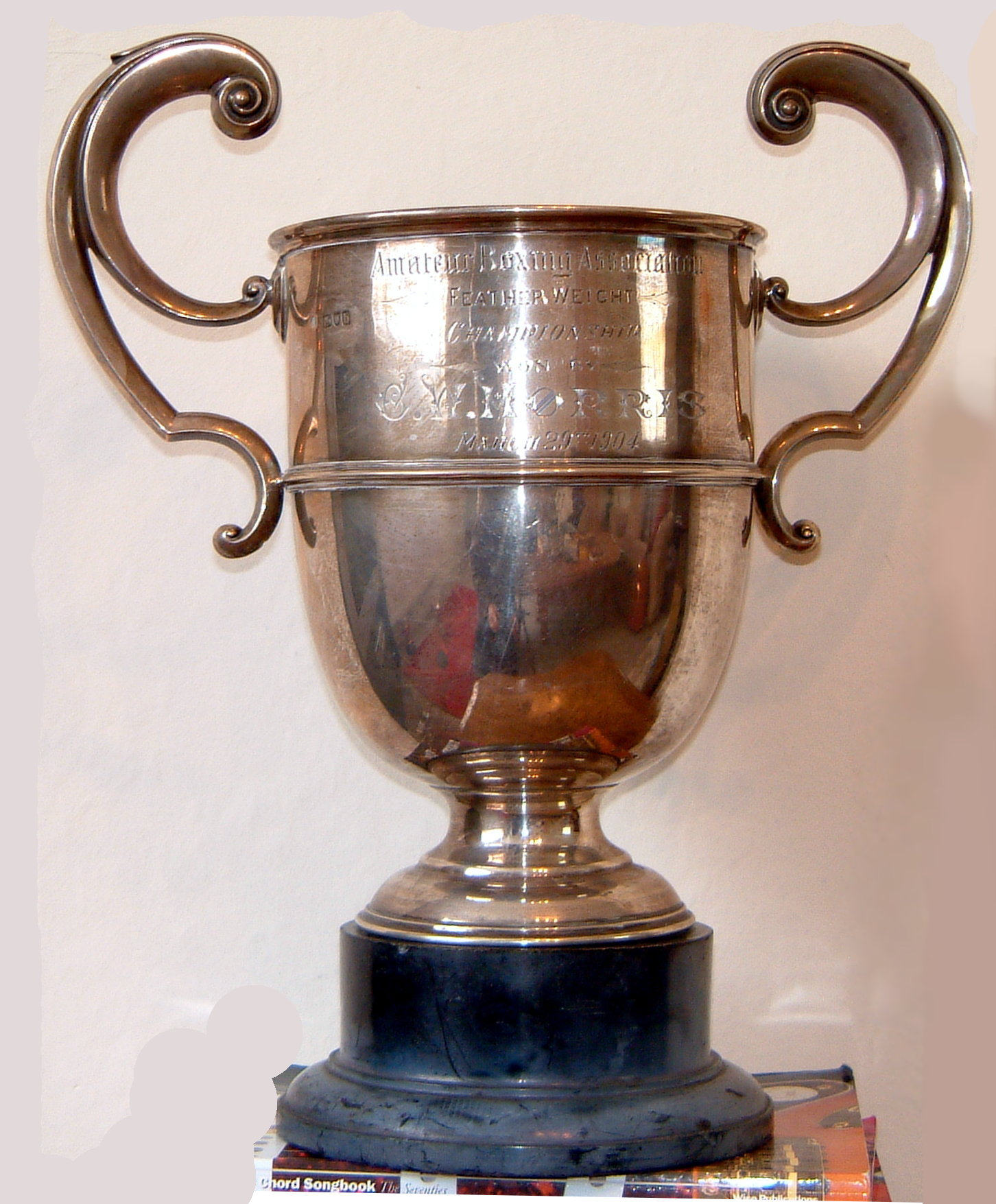
Winners are presented with various decorations, usually belts, medals, cups, and miniature gloves.

Amateur boxing awards system in essence duplicates the Olympic awards system with minor differences:

- (gold) Winner of the final round receives gold medal (1st place)
- (silver) Other finalist receives silver medal (2nd place)
- (bronze) Semifinalists, who didn't qualify for the finals, receive bronze medal (3rd place)

- Since most tournaments follow international regulations, including a 30-day suspension for knockout losses, both losers are awarded bronze medals. Some tournaments where only one third place available (instead of usual two), or where semifinals produce more than two bronze claimants, 3rd place bouts constitute a separate round. However, the third-place match is not held in most jurisdictions because of the automatic suspension making such a match improbable.

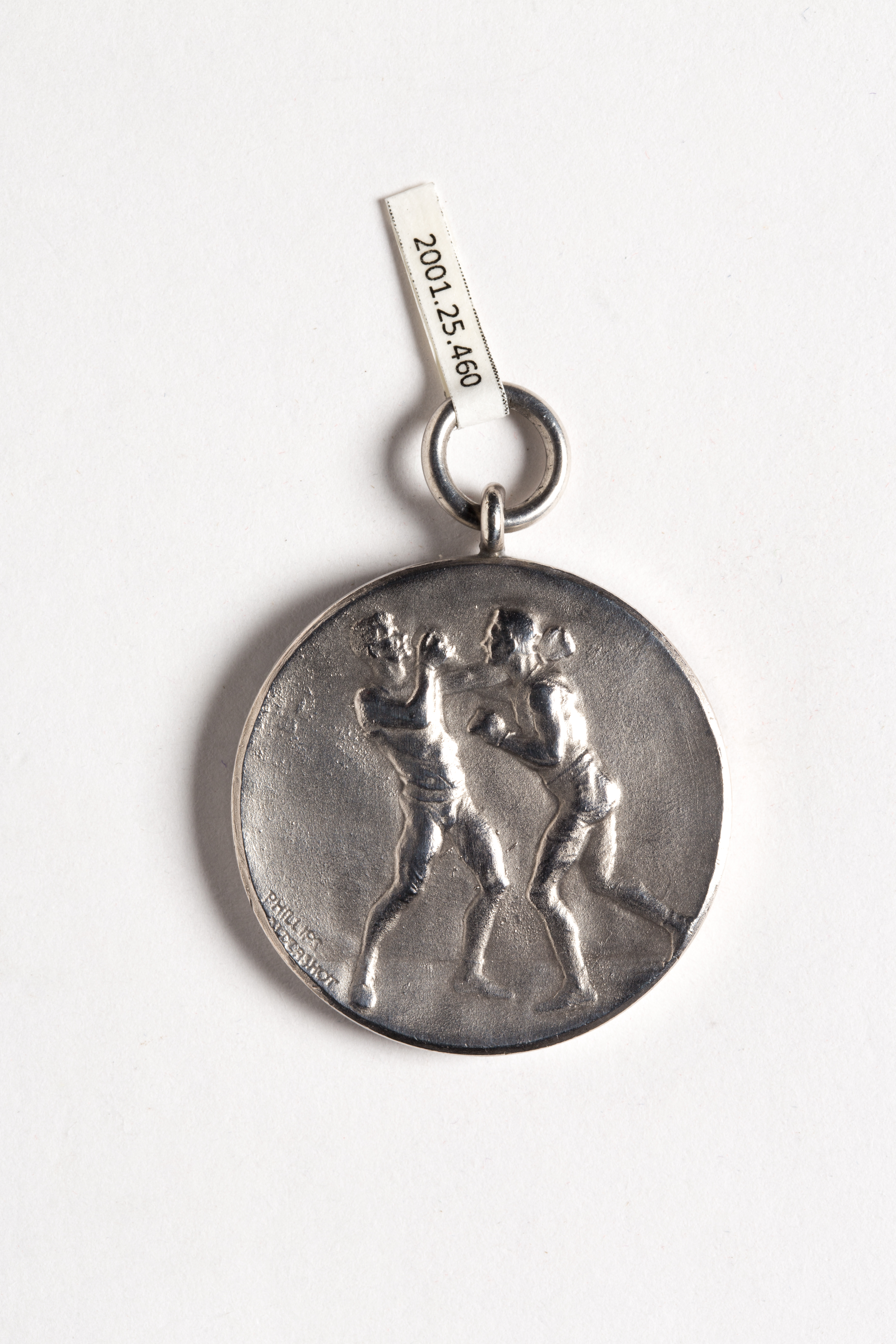

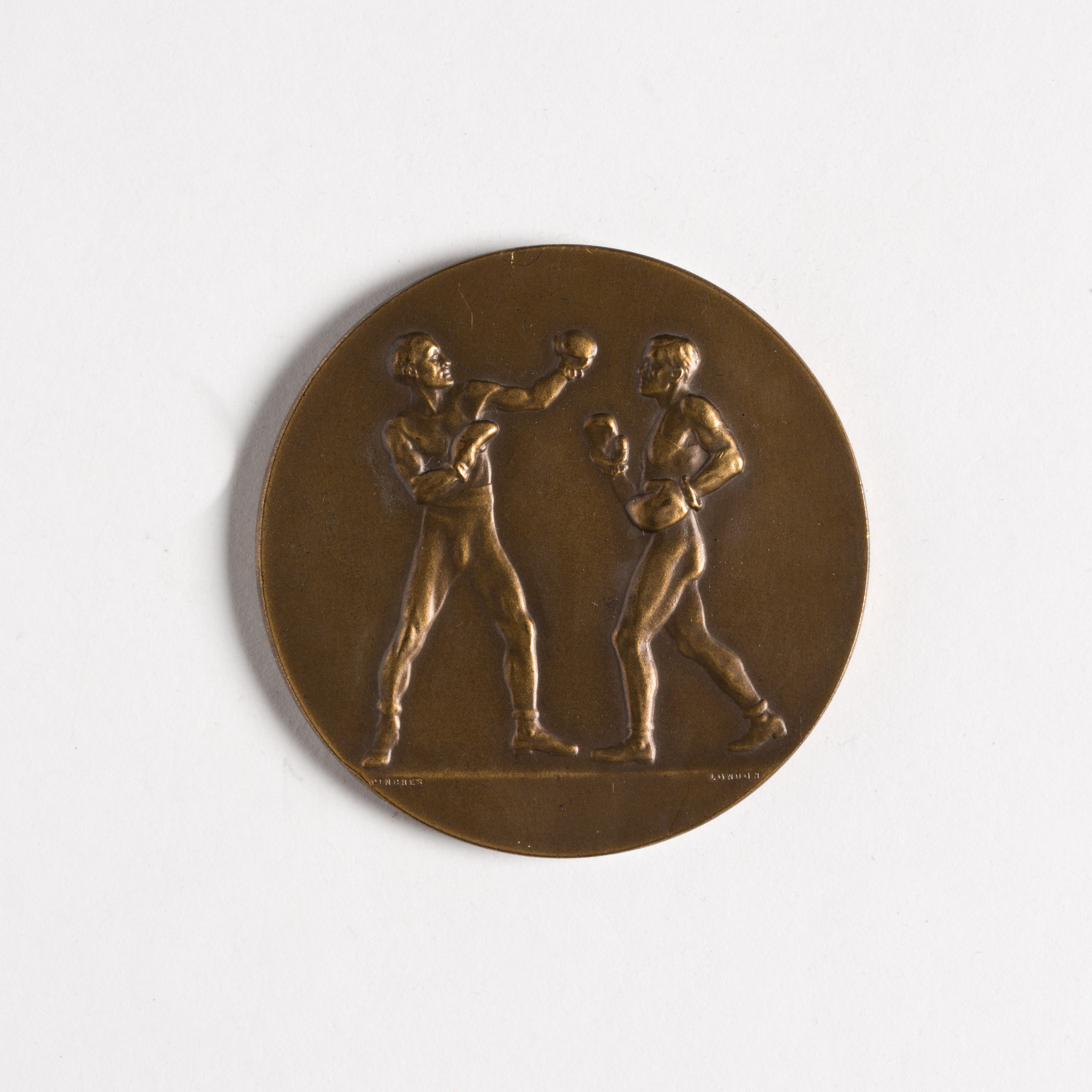

Second and third place finalists are usually presented with silver and bronze medals.

The United States tournaments and championships (except for those affiliated with World Boxing), contrary to European equivalent, usually do not award silver medals and bronze medals for 2nd and 3rd place respectively, as they acknowledge only the winners. Hence its colloquial name "Golden Gloves" (implying the winner takes all principle, which they are based upon). This is a parallel to professional boxing, which also does not use such terms as "second place" or "third place", it accepts only "champion" and "challenger".

=== Protective equipment ===
In March 2016, protective headgear that had been in use since 1982 was removed from men's competition due to higher concussion rates occurring in fights using headgear than in fights without the headgear. Women's competition was unaffected, as the AIBA announced that there wasn't enough data on its effects on women. This ruling was in place at the 2016 Summer Olympics.

=== Professional admittance ===
On several occasions in the 1990s, professional boxers, mostly from the post-Soviet states, resumed their amateur careers, namely: Nikolay Kulpin and Oleg Maskaev in 1993, Nikolai Valuev in 1994, Ruslan Chagaev in 1998.

In June 2016, professional boxers were admitted in the Olympic Games and other tournaments sanctioned by the AIBA. This was done in part to level the playing field and provide all of the athletes with the same opportunities as government-sponsored boxers from socialist countries and post-Soviet republics. However, professional organizations strongly opposed that decision.

Prior to this decision, amateur boxers from Western countries did not tend to compete at successive Olympic Games, as they typically turned professional after participating in the Games or other major international events. Meanwhile, boxers from Cuba and certain post-Soviet states, where professional sports are currently or were previously banned, were often state-sponsored. Though arguably professionals de facto, these athletes remained officially amateur.

== Competitions ==
Contrary to professional boxing, which utilizes lineal system, amateur boxing events are different in principle (although professional and amateur cards could appear much similar to each other).

=== Types of competition ===
Level of competition is determined by the representation range (the more nations participate, the more important the event is), as well as by quantity and quality of competitors.
Games	Quadrennial boxing events at the Olympic, regional, and sub-regional multi-sport games, are the highest-profile events in amateur boxing.	Governing bodies usually send their local representatives to attend the events, oversee and ensure the results.
There are also some differences between the Olympic boxing and amateur championship boxing, as boxing was introduced to the Olympics in 1904, and the world championships were first held seven decades later, in 1974 (the Val Barker Trophy resulted from those differences).		Governing bodies usually send their local representatives to attend the events, oversee and ensure the results.
Championships	Championships are second in importance to the games. Both require prior qualification to participate in.	Governing bodies usually send their local representatives to attend the events, oversee and ensure the results.
Cups	Cups are events of intermediate importance between championships and regular tournaments.	Governing bodies usually send their local representatives to attend the events, oversee and ensure the results.
Challenge	Challenge is a type of contest, which allows reigning Olympic and world champions, cup winners, regional games medalists, to compete versus each other and against top-ranked amateurs in-between the games and championships, matching them directly and thus negating the jiggering effects of complicated elimination systems.	Governing bodies usually send their local representatives to attend the events, oversee and ensure the results.
Tournaments	Tournaments could be either A-class (Olympic and World Championship qualifiers), or B-class (other). They are also sub-divided at national, invitational (i.e. open to competitors from other countries), grand prix, memorial, etc. Tournaments are the stepping stones for cups and championships.	Governing bodies usually send their local representatives to attend the events, oversee and ensure the results.
Duals	Duals are two-team match-ups. Competitors are teamed-up either locally, nationally, regionally, or by the club, or branch of service. Total team score counts for winning the dual. Winning team usually hosts the next dual. 1969 saw the first United States vs. Soviet Union boxing series, which became a frequent event since.	Duals and local match-ups are refereed and judged by the arranging authority usually on 50/50 basis.
Local match-ups	Locally arranged low-profile events, which usually do not affect any ratings or rankings.	Duals and local match-ups are refereed and judged by the arranging authority usually on 50/50 basis.
Exhibitions	Exhibitions allow amateur boxers to compete versus professional boxers on a non-profit basis.	Exhibitions are supervised by the arranging authority.

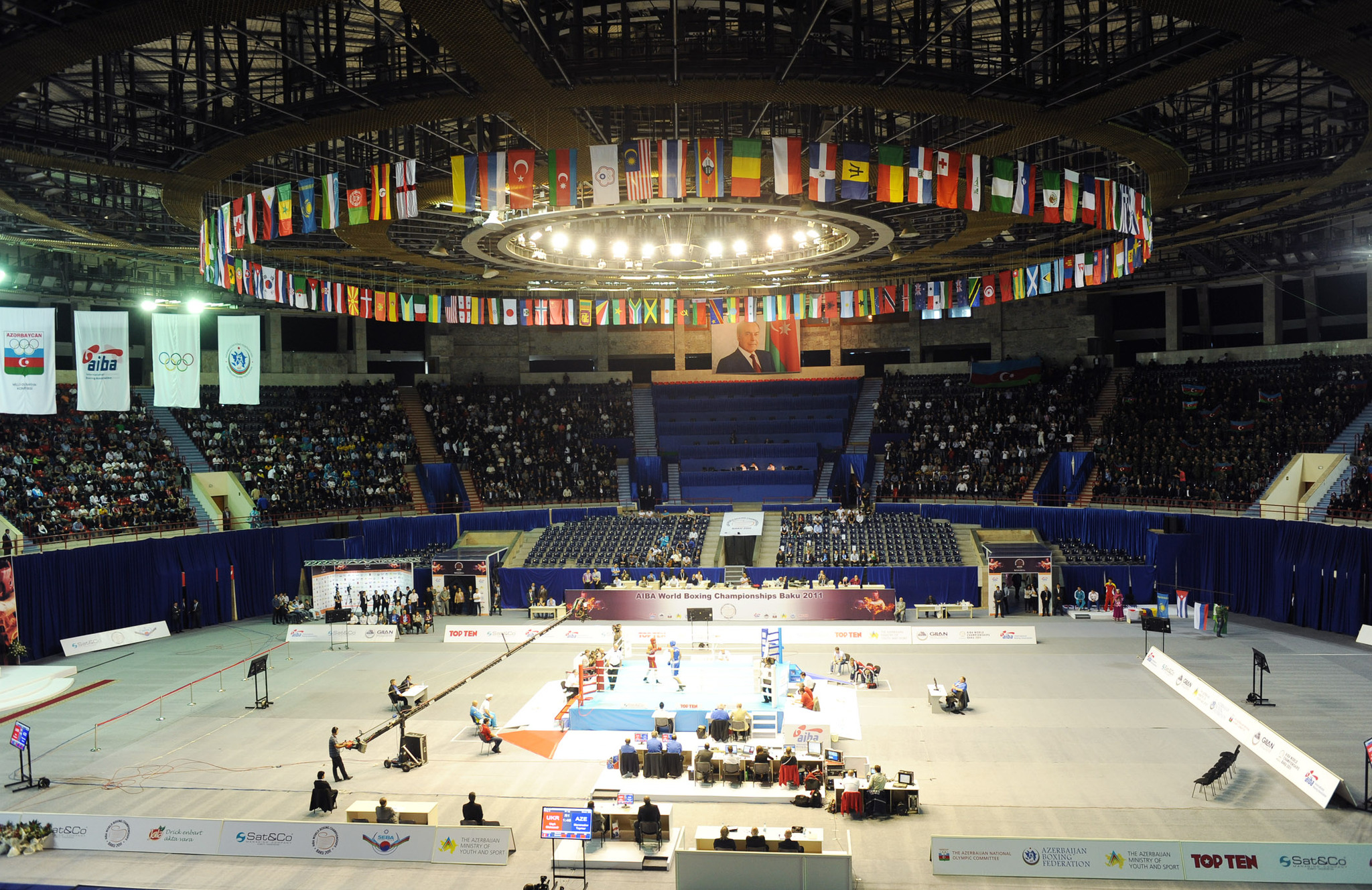
World championships are high-profile events, second in importance only to the Olympics.

Championships are usually divided into the following age-limited subcategories:

Senior	Youth	Junior	Cadet

The following ring-experience-oriented divisions are usually represented at tournaments:

Open	Novice	Sub-novice

There are also specific types of contest for servicemen and jailed people:

Military	Police	Penitentiary

In terms of weight classes contests could be either:

Absolute	Weight-limited

Absolute championships without weight limits completely or in two weight classes (over/under 91 kilogram) took place in socialist countries in the absence of professional boxing, allowing to determine country's undisputed champion regardless of weight (over 91: usually contested by light heavyweights and heavyweights; under 91: contested by middleweights with significant other advantages to compensate the weight disparity). Competitions other than absolute, always had strict weight regulations, weigh-in procedures, etc.

== Governing bodies ==
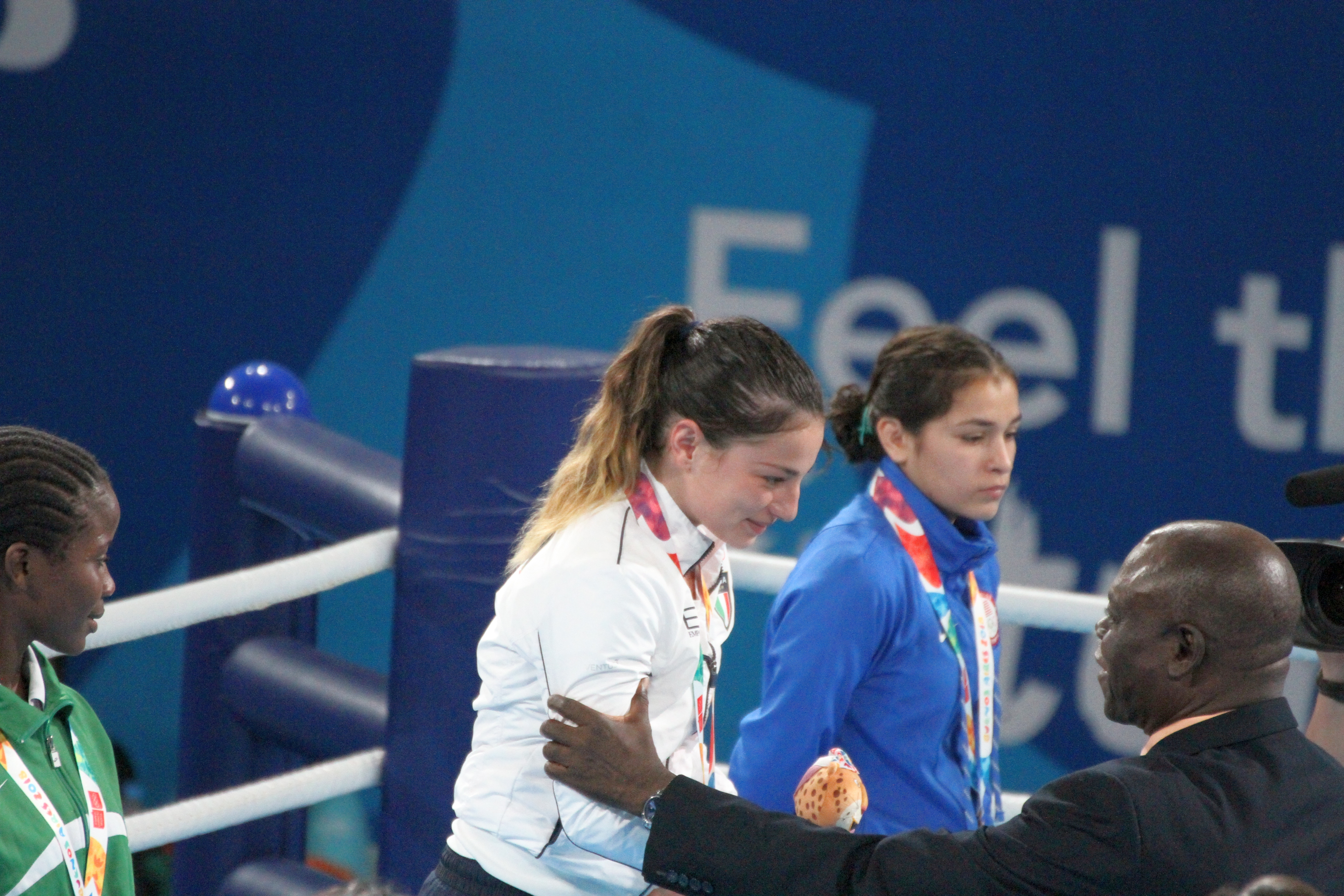
Governing body representatives attend the events to ensure compliance with the rules and congratulate the finalists.

There are several major international governing bodies in amateur boxing:

- International Boxing Association (IBA, formerly AIBA), established 1946. It is the oldest of the active governing bodies, and its rules (including a format of three 3-minute rounds, protective equipment, standing eight count, three knockdown rule, etc.) have been a de facto standard in international competition. It organizes the IBA World Boxing Championships. The IBA formerly sanctioned the boxing competitions at the Summer Olympics; in 2019, the organisation was suspended by the International Olympic Committee (IOC) due to governance issues and allegations of corruption, and is thus no longer involved in Olympic boxing. In 2023, the IOC voted to end its recognition of the IBA, citing that the issues raised upon the suspension had yet to be resolved.
- World Boxing, established 2023; it was formed as a split from the IBA in response to a history of governance issues that have impacted the group, and supports the continued inclusion of boxing in the Olympics. In February 2025, the IOC granted provisional recognition to World Boxing.
- Task forces overseen by the IOC have sanctioned boxing at the Olympics since 2020 due to the suspension of the IBA. The IOC boxing regulations have incorporated the IBA rules.
- International Military Sports Council (CISM), established 1948, responsible for boxing events at the Military World Games, and World Military Boxing Championships. In 2021, it signed a collaboration agreement with the IBA.

=== Disbanded governing bodies ===
- International Amateur Boxing Federation (FIBA), established 1920, the IBA predecessor, disbanded shortly after the World War II.
- International Association for Sports and Physical Culture (SASI), established 1920, the IOC Communist-twin, which was responsible for boxing events at the International Workers' Olympiads (socialist equivalent to the Olympics at the times when the socialist countries ignored the Western-hosted Olympiads). Disbanded in 1946 after the USSR decided to join IOC and AIBA.
- International University Sports Federation (FISU,) was responsible for boxing events at the Universiades (discontinued).
- Goodwill Games Organizing Committee (consisting partly of the U.S. and Soviet Sports Committee) was responsible for boxing events at the Goodwill Games.
- The National Collegiate Athletic Association sanctioned collegiate boxing championships of the U.S. from 1948 to 1960

Collegiate-level boxing competitions in the United States are usually regulated by one of two organizations: the National Collegiate Boxing Association (created in 1978) or the United States Intercollegiate Boxing Association (formed in 2012).

== National competitions ==
=== United States ===
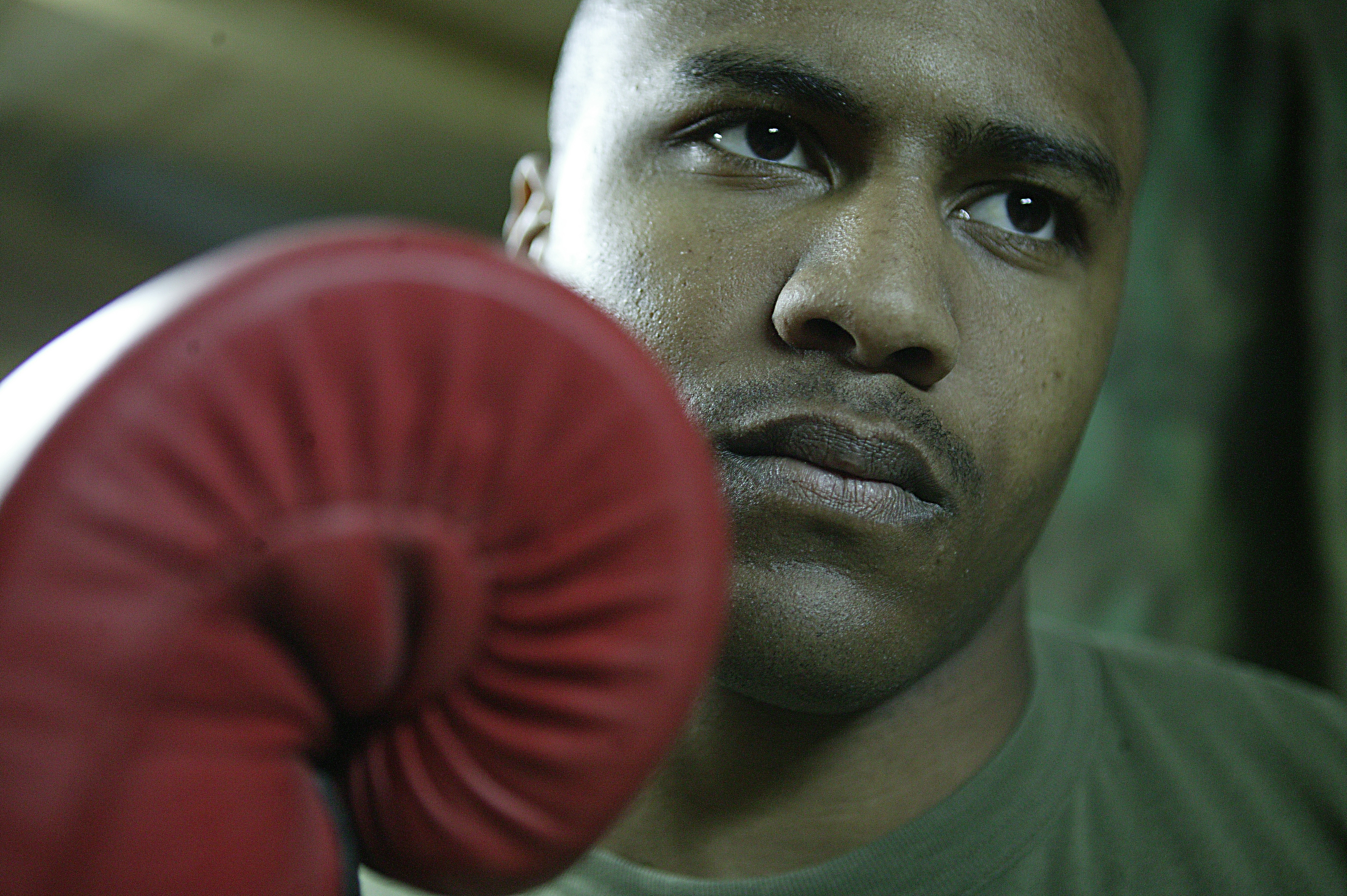
A Marine corporal active in USA Boxing (2005)

There are several different amateur sanctioning bodies in the United States, including the National AAU Boxing Committee, Golden Gloves Association of America and United States Amateur Boxing Federation (presently known as USA Boxing).

The Golden Gloves is an amateur boxing tournament that is fought at both the national level and the regional level. Although the Golden Gloves typically refers to the National Golden Gloves, it can also refer to the Intercity Golden Gloves, the Chicago Golden Gloves, the New York Golden Gloves, and other regional Golden Gloves tournaments. The winners of the regional tournaments fight in a national competition annually.

USA Boxing also sanctions a national tournament to determine who will compete on the United States national boxing team at the Olympic Games (either directly qualifying for the Olympics or through worldwide or regional qualifying tournaments).

=== Canada ===
Since 1969, amateur boxing in Canada has been regulated by the Canadian Amateur Boxing Association (Boxing Canada) and the various member provincial associations.

Some of the main tournaments include Provincial Championships, Golden Gloves, Silver Gloves, Emerald Gloves and Buckskin Gloves.

== Current world and Olympic champions ==
=== Men's Youth Division ===
Hebert Conceição	BRA	Middleweight 75 kg	Olympic Champion	-
Ja'Van Nurse	USA	Welterweight 69 kg	Olympic Champion	-
Julio César La Cruz	CUB	Heavyweight 91 kg	Olympic Champion	World Champion
Arlen López	CUB	Light Heavyweight 81 kg	Olympic Champion	-
Robby Gonzales	USA	Light Heavyweight 81 kg	-	World Champion
Jahmal Harvey	USA	Featherweight 57 kg	-	World Champion
Bakhodir Jalolov	UZB	Super Heavyweight +91 kg	Olympic Champion	-
Mark Petrovskii	RUS	Super Heavyweight +91 kg	-	World Champion
Yoenlis Hernández	CUB	Middleweight 75 kg	-	World Champion
Albert Batyrgaziev	RUS	Featherweight 57 kg	Olympic Champion	-
Galal Yafai	GBR	Flyweight 52 kg	Olympic Champion	-
Sewon Okazawa	JAP	Welterweight 69 kg	-	World Champion
Saken Bibossinov	KAZ	Flyweight 52 kg	-	World Champion
Temirtas Zhussupov	KAZ	Minimumweight 48 kg	-	World Champion
Tomoya Tsuboi	JAP	Bantamweight 54 kg	-	World Champion
Sofiane Oumiha	FRA	Lightweight 60 kg	-	World Champion
Yurii Zakharieiev	UKR	Light middleweight 71 kg	-	World Champion
Loren Alfonso	AZE	Cruiserweight 86 kg	-	World Champion

== See also ==
- Professional boxing
