= Constance Smith (tennis) =

English tennis player

- Full name: Constance Laura Mary Smith
- Country (sports): GBR
- Born: 1860 London, England
- Died: 27 October 1934 (age 74) London, England
- Turned pro: 1881 (amateur tour)
- Retired: 1891

Singles
- Career titles: 4

Doubles
- Career record: 6–2
- Career titles: 2

Constance Laura Mary Smith (1860 – 27 October 1934), also known as Constance Langley Smith, was an English tennis player active in the very early years of women's tennis in the 19th century. She was a finalist at the prestigious Northern Championships in 1882 where she lost to Ireland's May Langrishe. She was active from 1881 to 1891 and won 4 singles titles.

== Career ==
She was born Constance Langley in London, England in 1860. She played her first tournament in September 1881 at the St Leonards-on-Sea Tournament where she reached the final before losing to her sister Marion Langley in three sets. In June 1882 she took part in the first Northern Championships event for women, the tournament then was considered by players and historians as the four most important tennis tournaments to win. where she reached the singles final where she lost to Ireland's May Langrishe in straight sets.

In August 1882 she took part in the Darlington Open event and went to win her first title against Anthea Turner. In September she traveled to Edgbaston to take part in the Midland Counties Championships then one of the big regional tournaments in the English Midlands, where she progressed to the final and won the championship against Eva Adshead to claim her second title. Later that month she also took part in another big event for women the East Gloucestershire Championships where she reached the final before losing to Maud Watson in three sets.

She then decided to settle down and have a family and did not play any tournaments for the next five years. In 1887 she returned to the court and to take part in the South of England Championships probably the most important tournament in England at that time, after the Wimbledon, where she reached the final before going down in straight sets to Blanche Bingley Hillyard. Smith played predominantly on grass however in 1891 she travelled to France to take part in what would be her final tournament at the Boulogne International Championship in Boulogne-sur-Mer, it was played on clay courts where she advanced to the final before she was beaten by May Arbuthnot in four sets.

== Family ==
Constance had four sisters they were Augusta (b 1858), Florence (Flora, b. 1860) Grace, and Marion (b 1866) who also played lawn tennis. She married Charles John Chichester Smith in 1880. In later years Chalrles and Constance had three children, two boys and a girl, also called Constance.

== Career finals ==
=== Singles (7), titles (2), runners up (5) ===
(*) Denotes All-Comers final (w.o.) denotes walkover.

Category + (Titles)
Grand Slam/World Championship (0)
Important (1)
National ()
International (0)
Provincial/Regional/State (1)
County (1)
Regular (0)

Titles by Surface
Clay – Outdoor (0)
Grass – Outdoor (2)
Hard – Outdoor (0)
Unknown – Outdoor (0)
Carpet – Indoor (0)
Wood – Indoor (0)

No	Result	Date	Tournament	Surface	Opponent	Score
1.	Loss	17‑Sep‑1881	St Leonards-on-Sea Tournament	Grass	(England) Marion Langley	6–4, 2–6, 3–6
2.	Loss	17‑June‑1882	Northern Championships	Grass	(Ireland) May Langrishe	3–6, 6–8
1.	Win	7-Aug-1882	Darlington Open	Grass	(United Kingdom) Anthea Turner	6–3, 6–0
2.	Win	9-Sep-1882	Midland Counties Championships	Grass	(United Kingdom) Eva Adshead	6–1, 6–3, 6–0
3.	Loss	23-Sep-1882	East Gloucestershire Championships	Grass	(England) Maud Watson	2–6, 6–3, 5–7
4.	Loss	6-Sep-1887	South of England Championships *	Grass	(England) Blanche Bingley Hillyard	2–6, 1–6
5.	Loss	19-Sep-1891	Boulogne International Championship	Clay	(United Kingdom) May Arbuthnot	4–6, 2–6, 6–2, 1–6
