= Hastings and St. Leonard's Open =

Defunct tennis tournament
- Tour: LTA Circuit (1908-1911); ILTF World Circuit (1920-1959)
- Founded: 1908
- Abolished: 1958
- Location: Hastings, East Sussex, England.
- Venue: Central Recreation Ground
- Surface: Grass

The Hastings and St. Leonards Open was combined men's and women's tennis tournament founded in 1908. The first edition was played on grass courts at the Central Recreation Ground, Hastings, East Sussex, England. It eventually replaced the earlier South Saxons Open that ended in 1914, This event then ran annually till 1958.

== History ==
The event was established briefly before World War One in 1908 before stopping. In 1914 the earlier tournament the South Saxons Open was discontinued.

This event resumed in 1920 as the Hastings and St. Leonard's Open Lawn Tennis Tournament and was staged again at the Hastings Central Recreation Ground, a cricket venue that was utilised for other sporting events including archery, football and rugby, and also used as a general purposes recreation ground.

In 1925 the events name was changed again to the Hastings and St. Leonard's Open. Following World War Two the event was not resumed to the early to mid 1950s it lasted a few more editions until it was discontinued in 1958.

== Finals ==
=== Men's Singles ===
(incomplete roll).

| Year | Champion | Runner-up | Score |
|---|---|---|---|
| 1908 | (United Kingdom) Henry Brutton | (United Kingdom) W.H. Beale | 6–0, 6–3, 6–1 |
| 1909 | (United Kingdom) Henry Brutton (2) | (United Kingdom) Bertram Hopson | 2–6, 6–3, 6–3, 6–4 |
| 1920 | (United Kingdom) George Golding | (United Kingdom) F.J. Cutler | 7–5, 2–6, 6–1, 6–4 |
| 1921 | (Ireland) Cecil Campbell | (United Kingdom) Richard Powell | 6–0, 6–4, 6–2 |
| 1922 | (South Africa) Brian Norton | (United Kingdom) Leslie Godfree | 6–4, 6–2 |
| 1923 | (United Kingdom) Monty Temple | (United Kingdom) George Stoddart | 4–6, 6–2, 6–0 |
| 1924 | (India) Mohammed Sleem | (United Kingdom) Royden Dash | 4–6, 6–3, 6–1 |
| 1925 | (United Kingdom) Royden Dash | (United Kingdom) Roger George | 4–6, 1–6, 6–4, 6–0, 6–4 |
| 1926 | (United Kingdom) Royden Dash (2) | (United Kingdom) J.G. Hogan | 2–6, 6–2, 6–3, 6–1 |
| 1927 | (United Kingdom) J.G. Hogan | (United Kingdom) G. More | 6–8, 7–5, 6–3 |
| 1931 | (Japan) Jiro Satoh | (United Kingdom) Ralph Wackett | 6–1, 8–6 |
| 1932 | (Republic of Ireland) George Lyttleton-Rogers | (India) Atri Madan Mohan | 6–1, 4–6, 9–7 |
| 1933 | (South Africa) Bob Kirby | (Republic of Ireland) George Lyttleton-Rogers | 7–5, 6–1 |
| 1934 | (United Kingdom) Douglas Freshwater | (United Kingdom) Dickie Ritchie | 10–8, 4–6, 6–2 |
| 1935 | (United Kingdom) Colin Ritchie | (United Kingdom) Malcolm A. Young | 6–2, 6–4 |
| 1936 | (New Zealand) Alan Stedman | (United Kingdom) Murray Deloford | 6–0, 6–3 |
| 1937 | (New Zealand) Alan Stedman (2) | (Republic of Ireland) Henry Purcell | 6–4, 6–1 |
| 1938 | (India) Ghaus Mohammed Khan | (New Zealand) Dennis Coombe | 6–1, 6–1 |
| 1939 | (China) Kho Sin-Khie | (Poland) Ernest Wittmann | 7–5, 3–6, 6–4 |
| 1953 | (United Kingdom) Dennis Hales | (United Kingdom) P.V. Willford | 6–1, 6–1 |
| 1954 | (New Zealand) John M. Cope | (United Kingdom) J.F.B. Hunter | 6–3, 6–2 |
| 1955 | (United States) Hugh Sweeney | (United Kingdom) Norman Dale | 6–1, 6–1 |
| 1956 | (Pakistan) Khwaja Saeed-Hai | (United Kingdom) Geoff Cass | 6–0, 6–3 |
| 1957 | (United Kingdom) Bob Levine | (New Zealand) John Cope | 6–3, 6–1 |

=== Women's Singles ===
(incomplete roll)

| Year | Champion | Runner-up | Score |
|---|---|---|---|
| 1908 | (United Kingdom) Agnes Morton | (United Kingdom) Miss Tootell | 8–6, 6–1 |
| 1909 | (United Kingdom) Agnes Morton (2) | (United Kingdom) Jessie Tripp | 7–5, 6–0 |
| 1910 | (United Kingdom) Mildred Coles | (United Kingdom) E.E. Sargeant | 6–1, 6–0 |
| 1911 | (United Kingdom) Mildred Coles (2) | (United Kingdom) Doris Bullock | 6–3, 6-3 |
| 1912 | (United Kingdom) Madeline O'Neill | (United Kingdom) Christine Tyrrell | 6–2, 6–0 |
| 1913 | (United Kingdom) Aurea Edgington | (United Kingdom) Constance Luard | walkover |
| 1920 | (United Kingdom) Madeline O'Neill | (United Kingdom) Christine Tyrrell | 6–1, 6–4 |
| 1921 | (United Kingdom) Geraldine Beamish | (United Kingdom) Dorothy Kemmis-Betty | 6–2, 6–4 |
| 1922 | (United Kingdom) Geraldine Beamish (2) | (United Kingdom) Christine Tyrrell | 6–0, 6–1 |
| 1923 | (United Kingdom) Phoebe Holcroft | (United Kingdom) Joan Hextall | 6–1, 6–2 |
| 1924 | (United Kingdom) Phoebe Holcroft (2) | (United Kingdom) Geraldine Beamish | 4–6, 8–6, 6–2 |
| 1925 | (United Kingdom) Phoebe Watson (3) | (United Kingdom) Phyllis Howkins Covell | 6–4, 6–1 |
| 1926 | (United Kingdom) Phoebe Watson (4) | (United Kingdom) Joan Fry | 6–1, 3–6, 6–3 |
| 1927 | (United Kingdom) Phoebe Watson (5) | (United Kingdom) Christine Tyrrell | 6–4, 6–1 |
| 1928 | (United Kingdom) Christine Tyrrell | (United Kingdom) Vera Montgomery | 6–2, 6–4 |
| 1929 | (United Kingdom) Beatrice Feltham | (United Kingdom) Madge Slaney | 6–3, 6–3 |
| 1930 | (United Kingdom) Margaret Walsh Mellows | (United Kingdom) Madge Slaney | 6–4, 3–6, 6–1 |
| 1931 | (United Kingdom) Beatrice Feltham (2) | (United Kingdom) Madge Slaney | 6–3, 6–3 |
| 1932 | (United Kingdom) Beatrice Feltham (3) | (United Kingdom) Rita Jarvis | 6–2, 6–1 |
| 1933 | (United Kingdom) Effie Peters | (United Kingdom) Katherine Keith-Steele | 6–1, 7–5 |
| 1934 | (United Kingdom) Peggy Brazier | (United Kingdom) Joy Mowbray-Green | 4–6, 6–3, 6–4 |
| 1935 | (India) Leila Row | (United Kingdom) Peggy Brazier | 6–2, 9–7 |
| 1936 | (Chile) Anita Lizana | (United Kingdom) Gladys Southwell | 6–1, 6–3 |
| 1937 | (United Kingdom) Jean Saunders | (United Kingdom) Katherine Keith-Steele | 6–2, 6–4 |
| 1938 | (United Kingdom) Patience Thomson | (South Africa) Dulcie Kitson | 6–2, 6–1 |
| 1939 | (United Kingdom) Thelma Jarvis | (United Kingdom) Patience Thomson | 6–2, 6–1 |
| 1954 | (New Zealand) Evelyn Attwood | (United Kingdom) Gem Gilbert | 6–1, 6–2 |
