= Boxing in Cuba =

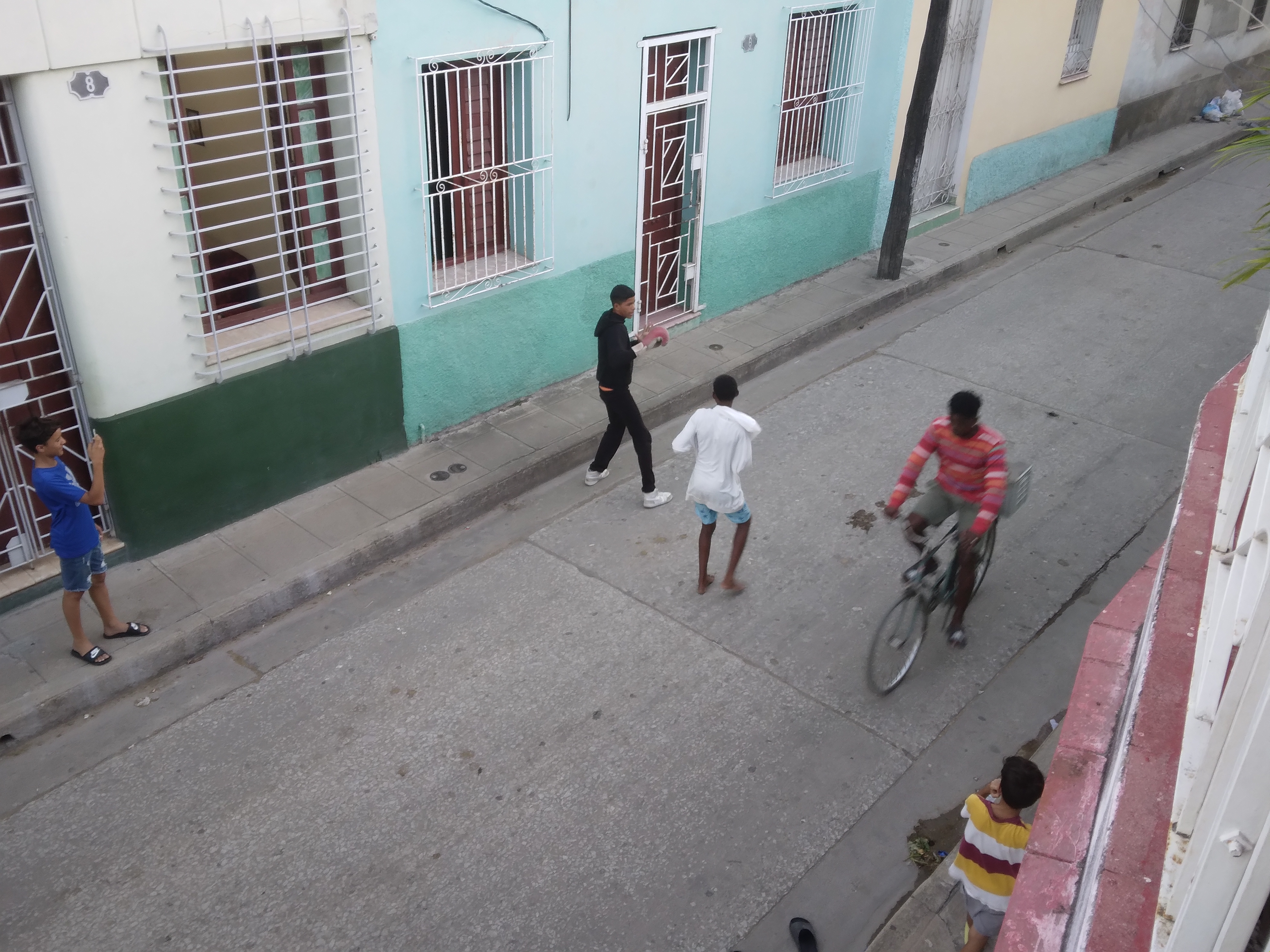
Amateur boxers practicing on the street in Camagüey, Cuba

Boxing is a popular sport in Cuba. As of 1992, there were over 16,000 boxers on the island. Across Cuba today there are 494 boxing coaches and 185 facilities. Of the 99,000 athletes in Cuba currently, 19,000 are boxers, including 81 of Olympic competence, even though only 12 make the Olympic team. Professional boxing was banned from 1962 until April 2022.

== History of boxing in Cuba ==
Boxing originally arrived in Cuba as a tourist attraction mainly as championship bouts between North American Boxers during the high tourist season. In 1909 Havana had its first professional fight. In 1910 a Chilean named John Budinich established the first boxing academy in Havana. Two years later government banned boxing due to the violence on the streets between blacks and whites. Boxing matches had to go behind closed doors as it grew popular throughout the island. Despite the banishment of the sport at the time, for the lower classes, boxing constituted a possible ticket out of poverty as well as steady and reliable entertainment.

A very famous and controversial contest took place in Cuba on April 5, 1915, when Jack Johnson, the world heavyweight champion, defended his title against Jess Willard. Willard won the title by a 26th. round knockout. The fight between the two Americans was controversial because it has been rumored several times that Johnson let Willard win the contest.

Recognizing boxing's potential to take families out of poverty and to entertain crowds, on December 13, 1921, Cuba decided to give boxing another chance and legitimized boxing with the establishment of the National commission on boxing and Wrestling. The lift on the ban brought tourist dollars with the bouts. Years later a national boxing academy was established to train talented athletes. The next decade Golden Gloves amateur competition had also arrived.

By 1959, Cuba had six professional world champions who were considered to be the founding fathers of boxing as well national heroes of Cuba. These fighters included Gerardo “Kid Gavilán” González, Benny Paret, and Eligio “Kid Chocolate” Sardinas. In spite of the sport's promise of prosperity, the Cuban boxers who earned a lot of money in the ring almost commonly died impecunious. Some boxers also had ties with the Mafia and other sources of corruption.

Cuba's boxing reputation also drew foreign boxers as well, such as Jack Johnson, Jack Dempsey, Jess Willard, Joe Louis, Joe Brown, and Sugar Ray Robinson. Although Cuba had traditionally done well in professional boxing, it did not win an Olympic medal in boxing until after 1959 due to considerable resources being devoted to the development of athletes as a result of the Cuban revolution.

In 1960, the professional boxer Benny Paret won the world welterweight title, and headed a strong contingent of professional Cuban boxers who followed up their fifth place at the 1954 games (two medals) with a first place, a position they have held in all subsequent Central American Games. In the Pan American games, where the competition was stronger, Cuban boxers also performed well, particularly from the late 1960s onward. The high international standard of Cuba's boxers was evident in the Olympic arena.

In 1961, along with other sports, the Revolutionary government banned professional boxing. However, thanks to a huge government financial investment, Cuba has built a reputation in Olympic boxing. At the 1968 Summer Olympics, Cuba won two silver medals. At the 1980 Moscow Olympics, Cuban boxers swept the field, winning ten medals, six of them gold. At the 1992 Summer Olympics in Barcelona, the Cubans outdid themselves, with seven gold and two silver medals.

By the 1980s, Cuban boxers were dominant in all major international amateur competitions, including the Olympics. Throughout its Olympic history, Cuba won 37 gold medals (73 overall) in boxing, second place in the all-time medal table. Cuba is the only country that has two three-time Olympic Champions: Teofilo Stevenson and Félix Savón.

The ban on professional boxing was lifted in April 2022.

== Cuban amateur boxing system ==
Foreign influence contributed to the development of Cuban amateur boxing. Before the Cuban Revolution in 1959, Cuba's achievements in amateur boxing were diminutive. Components of their boxing style were derived from American Professional Boxing. After the Revolution, Eastern European methodology replaced the American influences. Andrei Chervonenko of the Soviet Union has trained Teofilo Stevenson and his compatriot Vasili Romanov has trained boxers as well.

The Cuban government used sport as a means of exhibiting the success of the new socialist government, and winning medals in international competitions became a high-profile means of promoting the ideals of new Cuba. The Soviet Union sent experienced boxing coach Andrei Chervonenko to help develop Cuban fighters in order to assist its socialist brethren in their goals. Along with Cuba's own Alcides Sagarra, Chervonenko helped develop a comprehensive national recruiting and training program based on the Soviet model. Alcides Sagarra became Cuba's boxing head coach in 1960 and then later passed on his position to Sarbelio Fuentes in 2001.

The Cuban boxing system along with other sports programs start in grammar schools. Sports are considered a high priority in the Cuban education system and it's there a potential athlete can be recognized. From the age of 12, talented youths are sent to specialized schools where they can focus on enhancing their skills. From there the young boxers train throughout a very competitive youth program. The ones that graduate from the program are sent to the top school in Wajay, where they train advanced drills and exercises. The support that the state gives is crucial to the advancement of the highly technical boxing program.

Boxer Teofilo Stevenson who had won three Olympic gold medals in (1972, 1976, and 1980) has made many contributions to Cuba and Cuban boxing. He is equally known for his sportsmanship, receiving the UNESCO Pierre de Coubertin Fair Play prize in 1989. After retiring in boxing in 1986 he has served both in the Cuban parliament and as a vice president of the Cuban Boxing Federation.

After a career of fighting for their country most Cubans continue to stay in the sport, many as administrators or trainers. Through this way the knowledge and experience is passed down to the next generation of athletes.

== Bibliography ==
- Pettavino, Paula J. and Pye, Geralyn (1994) Sport In Cuba: The Diamond In The Rough. Pittsburgh: University of Pittsburgh. ISBN 0822937646
- Pettavino, Paula J. (2003) ”Boxing” in Encyclopedia Of Cuba. Eds. Luis Martinez-Fernandez, D.H. Figueredo, Louis Perez, and luis Gonzalez. Volume 2. Westport, Connecticut: Greenwood Press
