= Worcester Park Challenge Cup =

Defunct tennis tournament
- Tour: Mens Amateur Tour (1877–1912)
- Founded: 1879
- Abolished: 1882
- Editions: 4
- Location: Worcester, Worcestershire, England.
- Surface: outdoor (grass)

The Worcester Park Challenge Cup was an early Victorian era men's tennis tournament played at Worcester, Worcestershire, England. It was played on grass courts and ran for four editions from 1879 to 1882.

== History ==
The Worcester Park Challenge Cup was an early 19th century tennis event first staged end the first week July 1879 at Worcester, Worcestershire, England. The first winner of the men's singles was Britain's Mr F. Durant of the Cheam Club, he went onto win the title for three consecutive years.

A description of the event that concluded on 10 June 1882.

"The Challenge Cup, presented by Mr. A. Pollock in 1879, was on this occasion won by F. Durant, this being his third consecutive victory

— Lawn Tennis, Routledge's Sporting Annual (1883). p.113.

.

It was a featured regular series event on the Men's Amateur Tour (1877-1912).

== Sources ==
- Nieuwland, Alex (2011–2022). "Tournament – Worcester Park LTC". www.tennisarchives.com. Tennis Archives.
- Norham Gardens LTC. Oxford. Oxfordshire. England. www.norham.org.uk.
- Routledge's Sporting Annual (1883). George Routledge and Sons. London.
