= 1880 in sports =

1880 in sports describes the year's events in world sport.

== Athletics ==
- USA Outdoor Track and Field Championships

== American football ==
College championship

- College football national championship – Princeton Tigers and Yale Bulldogs (shared)

Events

- Walter Camp becomes an influential figure at the Massasoit House conventions where rules are debated and changed. His 1878 proposal to reduce the teams from fifteen players to eleven is passed in 1880, the effect being to open up the game and emphasise speed over strength. Camp's most famous rule proposal, the establishment of the line of scrimmage and the snap from center to quarterback, is also passed in 1880.

== Association football ==
England

- FA Cup final – Clapham Rovers 1–0 Oxford University at The Oval
- A dispute develops between Bolton Wanderers and the FA about professionalism, a heated topic in football through the 1880s which will directly or indirectly involve many other clubs besides Bolton. The FA espouses the so–called "Corinthian Spirit" and there are constant arguments about broken–time payments, out–of–pocket expenses and what amounts to actual wages. Despite its convictions, the FA has no objection to professional clubs playing in the FA Cup and this may be a tacit acknowledgement that the growth of professionalism is inevitable. There are close links at this time between football and cricket, which has employed professionals since the 17th century. Part of the problem is that many of the amateurs see football as "fun", but cricket is taken very seriously and the professional cricketer is considered necessary. Bolton Wanderers, formed in 1874 as a church team, has already become an ambitious club and is turning professional to attract talent from Scotland. Its neighbour Blackburn Rovers also turns professional in 1880.
- Manchester City founded as St Marks (West Gorton) by members of St Mark's Church Cricket team. First match was on 13 November.

Ireland

- Establishment of the Irish Football Association (IFA) in Belfast as the world's fourth oldest football association. Until the formation of the Football Association of Ireland (FAI) in 1921, the IFA administers football throughout Ireland although participation in the 19th century is mainly centred on the Belfast area. The IFA now governs football in Northern Ireland only and is not to be confused with the FAI which governs football in the Republic of Ireland.

Scotland

- Scottish Cup final – Queen's Park 3–0 Phonebank at Hampden Park

Australia

- The Wanderers, considered the first Australian soccer club, plays a match against members of the Kings School rugby team at Parramatta Common.

== Baseball ==
National championship

- National League champions – Chicago White Stockings

Events

- The latest National Association, a professional rival of the National League, goes out of business after its fourth season, contested by only three to four clubs.

== Boxing ==
Events

- 30 May — after four years of inactivity, Joe Goss finally defends his Heavyweight Championship of America title against Paddy Ryan at Collier's Station, West Virginia. Ryan wins after 87 rounds.
- John L. Sullivan is now the main contender for Ryan's title and announces that he will fight anyone in America, with or without gloves, for $500.

== Canadian Football ==
- The Canadian Rugby Football Union is formed, and consists of teams from Ontario and Quebec.

== Cricket ==
Events

- 6–8 September — the first ever Test match played in England sees England defeat Australia at The Oval by 5 wickets after W. G. Grace scores England's first Test century.

England

- Champion County – Nottinghamshire
- Most runs – Billy Barnes 1,220 @ 28.37 (HS 143)
- Most wickets – Alfred Shaw took 186 @ 8.54 (BB 8–31) and his Notts colleague Fred Morley took 184 @ 12.26 (BB 8–36)

Australia

- Most runs – Alec Bannerman 103 @ 25.75 (HS 52)
- Most wickets – William Cooper 12 @ 10.75 (BB 7–37)

== Golf ==
Major tournaments

- British Open – Bob Ferguson

== Horse racing ==
England

- Grand National – Empress
- 1,000 Guineas Stakes – Elizabeth
- 2,000 Guineas Stakes – Petronel
- The Derby – Bend Or
- The Oaks – Jenny Howlet
- St. Leger Stakes – Robert the Devil

Australia

- Melbourne Cup – Grand Flaneur

Canada

- Queen's Plate – Bonnie Bird

Ireland

- Irish Grand National – Controller
- Irish Derby Stakes – King of the Bees

USA

- Kentucky Derby – Fonso
- Preakness Stakes – Grenada
- Belmont Stakes – Grenada

== Rowing ==
The Boat Race

- 22 March — Oxford wins the 37th Oxford and Cambridge Boat Race

== Rugby football ==
Events

- Foundation of Batley RLFC, Leicester RUFC and Northampton RUFC

== Tennis ==
England

- Wimbledon Men's Singles Championship – John Hartley (GB) defeats Herbert Lawford (GB) 6–3, 6–2, 2–6, 6–3

World

- The 4th pre-open era 1880 Men's Tennis tour gets underway 13 tournaments are staged this year between 12 April – 28 November 1880.
