= John Budinich =

Chilean boxer (1881–1945)

Personal information
- Nicknames: John Budinich, Juan Budinich, John Budinich Taborga
- Nationality: (Chile) Chilean
- Born: Juan Budinich Taborga Coquimbo, Chile
- Died: June 29, 1945
- Occupation: Boxer
- Weight: Middleweight

Boxing career

Boxing record
- Total fights: 25
- Wins: 15
- Win by KO: 10
- Losses: 4

Juan "John" Budinich (1881 – 29 June 1945) was a Chilean boxer and boxing trainer who is recognized as the first Chilean professional boxer in boxing history.

== Early life ==
John Budinich was born in Coquimbo, Chile, in 1881 as Juan Budinich Taborga.

Juan Budinich, a fourteen-year-old cadet at the Chilean Naval Academy, knocked out an older officer who had been harassing him. In 1895, he stowed away on a ship where he was introduced to boxing. The ex-Naval cadet returned to Chile and opened the country's first boxing academy in Santiago.

In 1900, he helped organize what would become the first professional boxing match in Chile featuring Americans Frank Jones and Joe Daly in Valparaíso.

== Boxing career ==
Budinich's pro boxing debut took place in 1902 in Santiago de Chile.

By 1905, he stowed away to the United States and in 1907, he defeated Tim Carey in his American pro debut.

After a few fights, Budinich left the United States and went south to Panama. He fought multiple times in Colón before heading to Havana from 1910 to 1915. In 1910, Chilean John Budinich founded the first professional boxing academy in Cuba called Academia de Boxeo. He became Cuba's first boxing promoter and frequently staged boxing contests and headlined his own shows in Havana. In July 1910, he fought American Jack Ryan at the Payret Theatre. As it was reported in the United States media, the event was the first nationally publicized pro-fight in Cuba. Budinich's last fight in Cuba took place in 1915. He remained in Havana to oversee his academy until 1917, choosing to focus only on training and promotion. In 1917, he announced his departure and sold his gym.

The final professional bout for Budinich occurred in 1917 when he returned to Chile.

John Budinich died on July 29, 1945.

== Awards and honors ==
- Honored with street name in Coquimbo. (2014)
