= Henley Lawn Tennis Club Tournament =

Defunct tennis tournament
- Founded: 1880; 145 years ago
- Abolished: 1899; 126 years ago
- Location: Henley-on-Thames, Oxfordshire, England
- Venue: Henley Lawn Tennis Club
- Surface: Grass

The Henley Lawn Tennis Club Tournament was a late Victorian era men's and women's grass court tennis tournament established in October 1880. The tournament was organised by the Henley Lawn Tennis Club and held at Henley-on-Thames, Oxfordshire, England which ran until at least 1899.

== History ==
The Henley Lawn Tennis Club Tournament was a men's and women's grass court tennis tournament first staged in October 1880. This event ran through until at least 1899. It was organised by the Henley Lawn Tennis Club and usually staged at Henley-on-Thames, Oxfordshire, England.

== Venue ==
The Henley Lawn Tennis Club was founded in 1880. By 1896 the club consisted of four grass courts and a pavilion, and at this time was based at Marlow Road. Henley Tennis Club is still operating today.
