= Bosmere Lawn Tennis Club Tournament =

Defunct tennis tournament
- Founded: 1880; 146 years ago
- Abolished: 1885; 141 years ago
- Location: Creeting St Mary, Mid Suffolk, England; Coddenham, Mid Suffolk, England
- Venue: Creeting Rectory; Shrubland Hall
- Surface: Grass

The Bosmere Lawn Tennis Club Tournament was a Victorian era men's and women's grass court tennis tournament established in September 1880. The first edition was organised by the Bosmere Lawn Tennis Club and played at Creeting St Mary, Mid Suffolk, England and ran until at least 1885.

== History ==
The Bosmere Lawn Tennis Club Tournament was a men's and women's grass court tennis event first staged in September 1880. The first edition was played at the Creeting Rectory, Creeting St Mary, Ipswich, Suffolk, England. In July 1884 a lawn tennis tournament was played at Shrubland Hall, it is likely this could be by the same club. In late September 1885 the venue was the host location of the final known edition of this tournament that was also played at Shrubland Park on the Shrubland Hall estate Coddenham, Mid Suffolk, England.

== Venues ==
Early records of the Bosmere Lawn Tennis Club are scarce. They do not appear to have had their own dedicated grounds; instead, they relied upon friendly benefactors and patrons who allowed the club to stage events on the grounds of stately homes.
