= Blackmoor Vale LTC Tournament =

Blackmoore Vale LTC Tournament

Defunct tennis tournament
- Founded: 1880; 145 years ago
- Abolished: 1883; 142 years ago
- Location: Sherborne, nr Blackmore Vale, North Dorset, England
- Venue: Sherborne School Cricket Ground
- Surface: Grass

The Blackmoor Vale LTC Tournament was a late Victorian era men's tennis tournament founded in August 1880. It was first staged at Sherborne, nr Blackmore Vale, North Dorset, England and ran through until 1883 when it was abolished.

== History ==
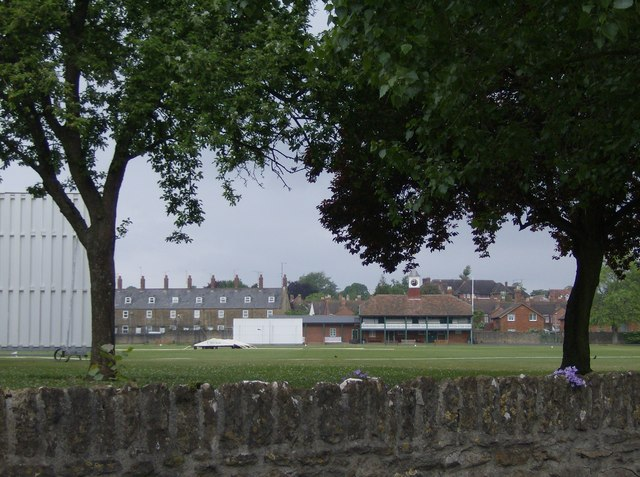

(Image left is of Sherborne School cricket ground, Sherborne, Dorset taken in 2007, was the location of this tournament)

The Blackmoor Vale LTC Tournament was organised by the Blackmoor Vale Archery and Lawn Tennis Club and first staged in August 1880 on the cricket ground of the Sherborne School (f. 1550) and was held for only three editions before it was abolished.
