= Savernake Forest LTC Tournament =

Defunct tennis tournament
- Founded: 1880; 146 years ago
- Abolished: 1880; 146 years ago
- Location: Savernake, Wiltshire, England
- Venue: S.F.C.C. Ground
- Surface: Grass

The Savernake Forest LTC Tournament was a late Victorian era grass court tennis tournament staged in mid-October 1880 at the Savernake Forest, LTC, Savernake, Wiltshire, England, which ran for just one known edition.

== History ==
The Savernake Forest LTC Tournament was a tennis event staged in mid-October 1880. It was organised by Savernake Forest Lawn Tennis Club, with the event being held on the Savernake Forest Cricket Club (SFCC) grounds, Savernake, Wiltshire, England. The first and final winner of the men's singles was Ireland's George R. M. Hewson.

== Location and venue ==
Savernake is a civil parish immediately south and southeast of Marlborough, Wiltshire, England. The Savernake Forest LTC, founded in 1878, held its first known tournament in 1880 on the SFCC grounds.

== Finals ==
=== Men's Singles ===
(Incomplete roll)

Year	Winner	Runner-up	Score
1880	(Ireland) George Rawdon Maurice Hewson	(United Kingdom) Mr. Dunning.	?
