= Dirleton Castle LTC Tournament =

Defunct tennis tournament
- Founded: 1880; 145 years ago
- Abolished: 1885; 140 years ago
- Location: Dirleton Castle, Dirleton, East Lothian Scotland
- Venue: Dirleton Castle Lawn Tennis Club
- Surface: Grass

The Dirleton Castle LTC Tournament was a late Victorian era men's and women's grass court tennis tournament established in October 1880. The first edition was organised by the Dirleton Castle Lawn Tennis Club and played on its grounds close to Dirleton Castle, in the village of Dirleton, East Lothian Scotland and ran until at least 1885.

== History ==
The Dirleton Castle LTC Tournament was a men's and women's grass court tennis event first staged in October 1880. The first edition was played at the Dirleton Castle Lawn Tennis Club grounds, Dirleton Castle, Dirleton, East Lothian Scotland. In 1884 the club held another lawn tennis tournament.

A description of the venue that appeared in Pastimes 27 February 1884:

Dirleton LTC boasted it's grounds 'as one of the most romantically situated in Scotland, being surrounded by yew trees, of great antiquity, and close to the old Norman castle of Dirleton.

— Pre-war lawn tennis clubs and tournaments, Lake, Robert. J. A Social History of Tennis in Britain (2014). p. 46.

In July 1885 the club held another tournament as part of a Grand Fancy Bazaar held in the Castle Gardens and Castle Park, Dirleton.
