= Langley Marish Tournament =

Defunct tennis tournament
- Founded: 1880; 145 years ago
- Abolished: 1885; 140 years ago
- Location: Langley Marish, Berkshire, England
- Venue: Eaton Recreation Ground
- Surface: Grass

The Langley Marish Tournament was a late Victorian era grass court tennis tournament established in 1880. It held in Langley Marish, Berkshire, England and ran through until 1885 when it was abolished.

== History ==
This tournament was first staged in August 1880. From 1882 until 1884 the tournament was staged at the Eaton Recreation Ground, Eaton, Berkshire. The inaugural men's singles was won by Mr. C.O. Phipps. The 1882 edition was won by Mr. E. Montresor. The final two editions was won by Mr. Felix H.G. Palmer.
