= Mersey Bowmen (Sefton Park) Tournament =

Defunct tennis tournament
- Event name: Mersey Bowmen Archery Club Tournament; Mersey Bowmen LTC Tournament
- Founded: 1880; 145 years ago
- Abolished: 1903; 122 years ago
- Location: Sefton Park, Aigburth, Liverpool, Lancashire, England
- Venue: Mersey Bowmen Lawn Tennis Club
- Surface: Grass

The Mersey Bowmen (Sefton Park) Tournament was a combined men's and women's grass court tennis event founded in 1880 as the Mersey Bowmen Archery Club Lawn Tennis Tournament. It was held at the Mersey Bowmen Archery Club, Sefton Park, Aigburth, Liverpool, Lancashire, England through until 1903.

== History ==
In July 1880 the Mersey Bowmen Archery Club (f. 1781) established its first lawn tennis tournament in July 1880 known as the Mersey Bowmen Archery Club Lawn Tennis Tournament. By 1884 the tournament was being promoted under the name the Mersey Bowmen LTC Tournament. By 1903 celebrating its 23rd annual event it was known then as the Mersey Bowmen (Sefton Park) Tournament.

In December 2011 The Mersey Bowmen Lawn Tennis Club nearly closed forever, but was saved when it received funding from a grant from Sport England as part of the Olympic legacy fund to keep it open.

== Venue ==
The Mersey Bowmen Lawn Tennis Club was founded as a Mersey Bowmen Archery Club in 1781, the Bowmen occupied sites around Liverpool, including Cazneau Street and Lodge Lane, before moving to the newly created Sefton Park in 1872.
