= Truro LTC Open Tournament =

Defunct tennis tournament
- Event name
- Founded: 1880; 146 years ago
- Abolished: 1888; 138 years ago
- Location: Truro, Cornwall, England
- Venue: Truro Lawn Tennis Club
- Surface: Grass

The Truro LTC Open Tournament was a late Victorian era grass court tennis tournament first staged on 24 September 1880. The tournament was organised by the Truro Lawn Tennis Club, and held on the cricket grounds, Truro, Cornwall, England. The tournament was held to at least 1888.

== History ==
On 24 September 1880 the Truro Lawn Tennis Club held an open lawn tennis tournament for men and women at the cricket grounds, Truro, Cornwall, England that concluded on 25 September 1880. In the men's singles Mr. G. Casey defeated Mr. William Ewart Beamish Barter. In the mixed soubles final Mr.G. Casey and Mrs Casey defeated. Dr. F. Collins and Miss Paul. The Truro LTC Open Tournament was held annually until 1888, when it was discontinued.

== Venues ==
The first Truro Lawn Tennis Club lasted to around 1890. In 1900 a new club the Kenwyn (Truro) Lawn Tennis Club was established. It staged its first open tournament in 1909. In 1957 Truro Lawn Tennis Club at Kenwyn closed. The modern day Truro Lawn Tennis Club is still active today.

== Sources ==
- Archives, The National; and Cornish Studies Service, Archives (1900–1957). "Truro Lawn Tennis Club". discovery.nationalarchives.gov.uk. The Discovery Service. AD474.
- Royal Cornwall Gazette. (1 October 1880) Truro, Cornwall, England: British Newspaper Archives.
- Royal Cornwall Gazette. (16 August 1888) Truro, Cornwall, England: British Newspaper Archives.
- Nieuwland, Alex. "Edition – Truro 1880. www.tennisarchives.com. Tennis Archives.
- Truro LTC. clubspark.lta.org.uk. LTA.
