= South Saxons Open =

Defunct tennis tournament
- Tour: LTA Circuit (1888-1914)
- Founded: 1880
- Abolished: 1914
- Location: St. Leonards on Sea, Hastings, East Sussex, England.
- Venue: Archery Gardens/South Saxon Ground
- Surface: Grass

The South Saxons Open was an late 19th century and early 20th century combined men's and women's tennis tournament founded in 1880 as the St. Leonards on Sea Lawn Tennis Tournament. The first edition was played on grass courts Archery Gardens, St. Leonards on Sea, Hastings, East Sussex, England. Following World War One it was replaced in the LTA calendar by the Hastings and St. Leonard's Open.

== History ==
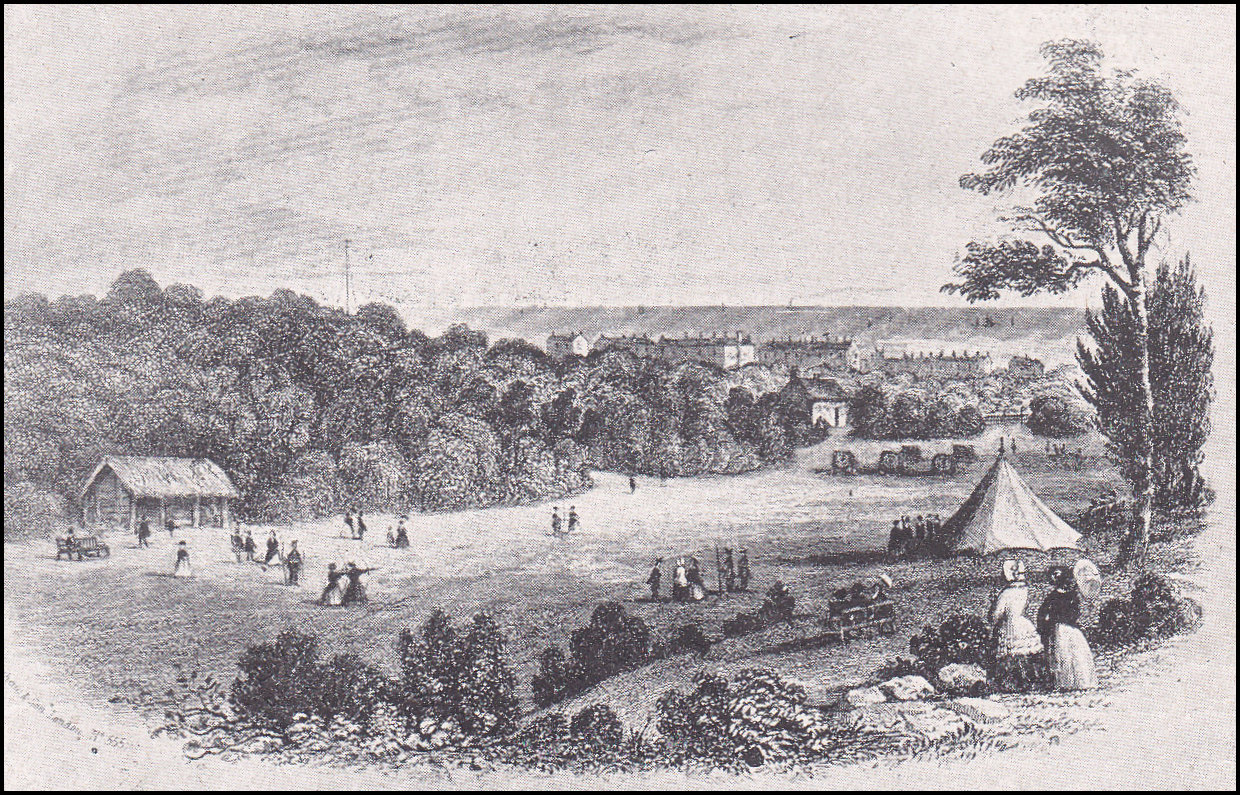

(Left is a drawing of The Archery Gardens, St.Leonards on sea, date unknown, it was the location of the first event.)

The South Saxons Open Tournament was an early Victorian period men's and women's tennis tournament founded in 1880 as the St. Leonards on Sea Lawn Tennis Tournament. The first edition was played on grass courts Archery Gardens, St. Leonards on Sea, Hastings, East Sussex, England.

In 1886 the South Saxons Cricket and Lawn Tennis Club was formed and opened their grounds. On 27 August 1886 the South Saxon Tennis Tournament was held at Glynde Park. The tournament continued under this name until around 1891. In 1892 it was then being called the South Saxons Open Tournament. The tournament was staged up to at least 1914 under this just before the start of World War I. The South Saxons Open Tournament operating under that name was not staged again.

In 1908 a new tournament emerged called the Hastings and St. Leonard's Open it was staged for the first time at the Central Recreation Ground, a cricket venue that was utilised for other sporting events including Tennis, Football and Archery and also as a general recreation ground. This event would replace it in the LTA calendar and it ran until 1959.

Former winners of the men's singles title include Joshua Pim, Ernest Wool Lewis and Herbert Wilberforce.

== Venues ==
This tournament at inception was originally held at the Archery Gardens, St. Leonard's. By 1886 the tournament was staged at the South Saxon Grounds, West St. Leonard's (today called the South Saxon Nature Reserve). In 1887 the event was staged for one edition at Glynde Park, Glynde Place, Glynde.

== Finals ==
=== Mens Singles ===
Year	Champion	Runner-up	Score
1880	(England) Robert Wilson	(England) Arthur Soames	?
1881	(England) Arthur Soames	(England) Robert Wilson	6–4, 6–5, 6–5
1882	(England) Robert Wilson (2)	(England) Arthur Soames	2–1 sets
1883	(England) Robert Wilson (4)	(England) Arthur Coles	2–0 sets
1884	(England) Robert Wilson (5)	(England) William Beasley	5–7, 6–1, 6–4, 6–1
1885	(England) Herbert Wilberforce	(England) S. Wilson	?
1888	(United Kingdom) Herbert Wilberforce (2)	(United Kingdom) J.E. Kingsley	6–1, 6–0, 6–2
1889	(United Kingdom) Ernest Wool Lewis	(Ireland) Charles P. Hayes	6–3, 6–2, 6–4
1890	(Ireland) Joshua Pim	(United Kingdom) Ernest Wool Lewis	6–4, 6–4, 1–6, 6–2
1891	(Ireland) Joshua Pim (2)	(Australia) Samuel H. Hughes	6–1, 6–1

=== Womens Singles ===
Year	Champion	Runner-up	Score
1880	(England) Augusta Langley	(England) Flora Langley	6–4, 6–4
1881	(England) Augusta Langley (2)	(England) Constance Smith	4–6, 6–2, 6–3
1885	(England) Constance Smith	(England) E. King	6–5, 6–2
1887	(England) Constance Smith (2)	(England) E. King	6–5, 6–2
1908	(United Kingdom) Christine Tyrell	(United Kingdom) Doris Bullock	7–4, 6–3
1909	(United Kingdom) Mrs Swan	(United Kingdom) Mrs Wood	walkover
1910	(United Kingdom) Mildred Coles	(United Kingdom) Edith Sargeant	6–1, 6–0
1910	(United Kingdom) Miss Harrison	(United Kingdom) Mrs Swan	6–2, 6–3
1911	(United Kingdom) Mildred Coles (2)	(United Kingdom) E. Firth	6–1, 6–2
1914	(United Kingdom) M. Towler	(United Kingdom) Ada Spencer Hollick	6–4, 6–3
