= Kemptown Tournament =

Defunct tennis tournament
- Founded: 1880; 145 years ago
- Abolished: 1880; 145 years ago
- Location: Kemptown, Brighton, East Sussex, England
- Surface: Grass

The Kemptown Tournament was a late Victorian period combined men's and women's grass court tennis tournament held only one time in June 1880, at Kemptown, Brighton, East Sussex, England.

== History ==
The Kemptown Tournament was a Victorian era grass court tennis tournament staged only one time from 14 to 21 June 1880. The tournament featured both a men's and women's singles events. The gentleman's singles was won by Sir Arthur Oldham Jennings who defeated Sir Thomas Jenner Verrall, and the ladie's singles was won by Miss Adshead who defeated Eva Adshead 6–1, 4–6, 3–6, 6–2, 6–3, this match was unusual in that it featured a five set match.
