= 1863 Open Championship =

Tournament information
- Dates: 18 September 1863
- Location: Prestwick, South Ayrshire, Scotland
- Course: Prestwick Golf Club

Statistics
- Field: 14 players
- Prize fund: £10
- Winner's share: Nil

Champion
- (Scotland) Willie Park, Sr.
- 168

Location in Scotland

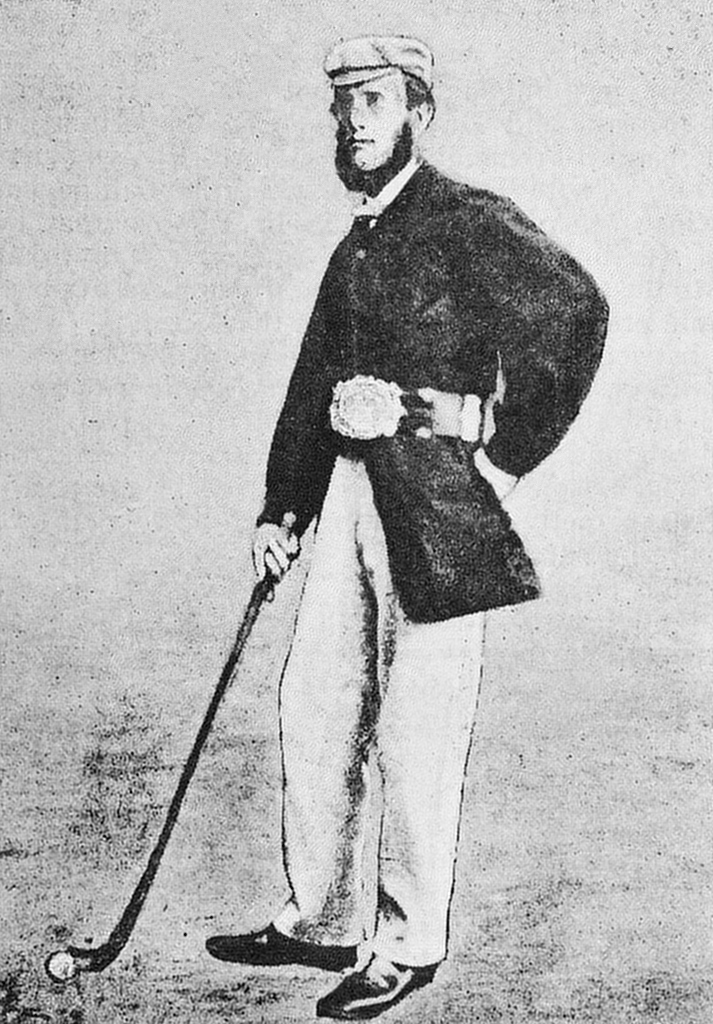
Willie Park, Sr. winner of the Challenge Belt in 1863

The 1863 Open Championship was the fourth Open Championship and was again held at Prestwick Golf Club. Eight professionals and six amateurs contested the event in wet and windy weather, with Willie Park, Sr. winning the championship for the second time, by two shots from Tom Morris, Sr.

As in previous years, the contest was held over three rounds of the twelve-hole links course. For the first time there was prize money for those finishing 2nd, 3rd and 4th, although the winner only received the Challenge Belt for the next year.

Davie Park, younger brother of Willie, led after the first round with a score of 55. An excellent second round 54 meant that Willie led by four strokes. Eventually Willie won by two strokes from Morris, spoiling Morris's attempt at a third consecutive win, which would have given him outright possession of the Challenge Belt, although Morris took the second prize of £5.

== Final leaderboard ==
Friday, 18 September 1863

Place	Player	Score	Money
1	(Scotland) Willie Park, Sr.	56-54-58=168	
2	(Scotland) Tom Morris, Sr.	56-58-56=170	£5
3	(Scotland) Davie Park	55-63-54=172	£3
4	(Scotland) Andrew Strath	61-55-58=174	£2
5	(England) George Daniel Brown	58-61-57=176	
6	(Scotland) Robert Andrew	62-57-59=178	
7	(Scotland) Charlie Hunter	61-61-62=184	
8	(Scotland) James Knight (a)	66-65-59=190	
9	(Scotland) James Miller (a)	63-63-66=192	
10	(Scotland) Peter Chalmers	65-67-65=197	
10	(Scotland) J. F. Johnston	65-66-65=197	
10	(Scotland) James Paxton	197	
