= Symington, South Ayrshire =

Coordinates: 55.549608°N 4.562544°W

Symington
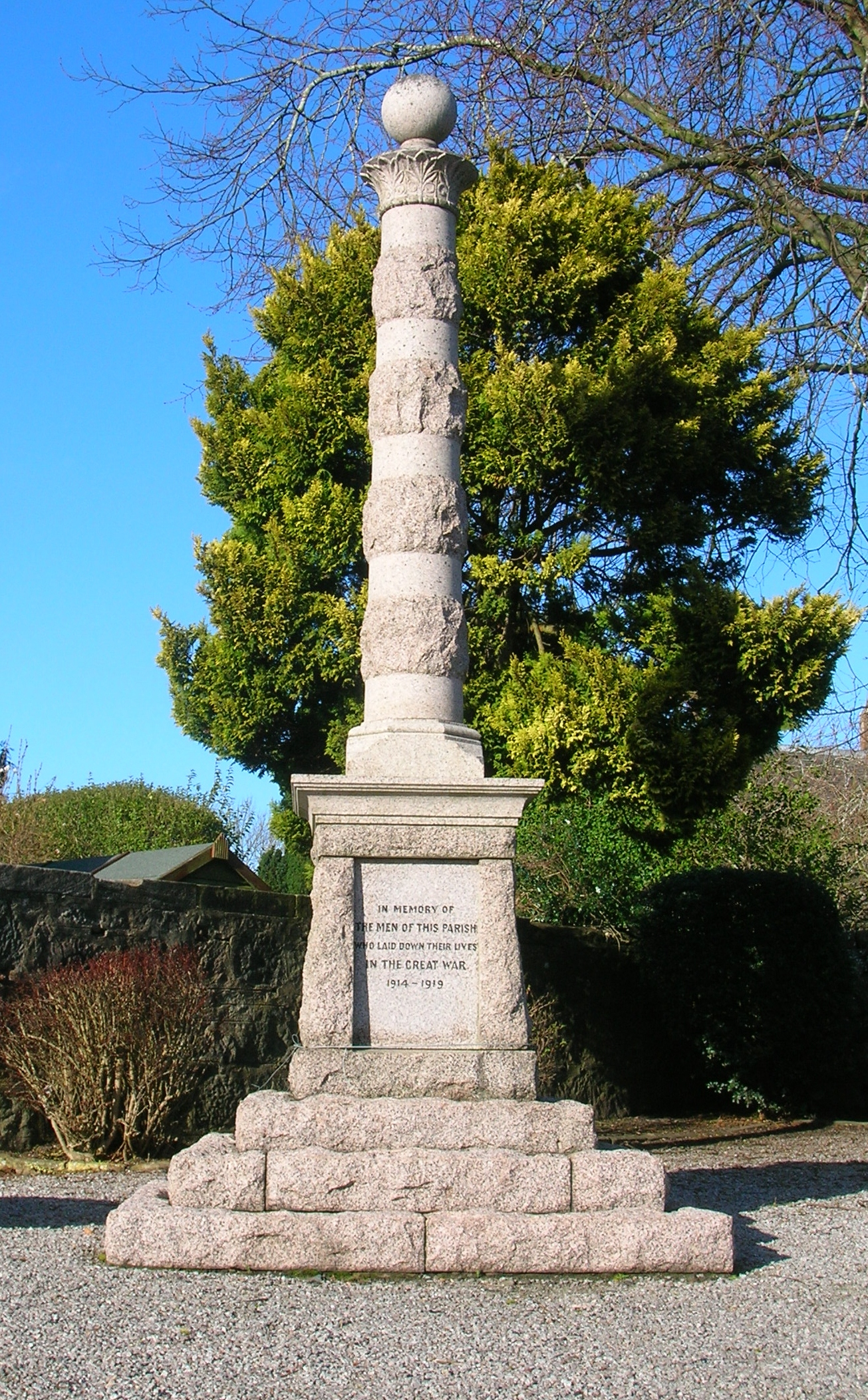
- The Symington War Memorial

- Location within South Ayrshire
- Population: 1,510 (2020)
- OS grid reference: NS384314
- Council area: South Ayrshire
- Lieutenancy area: Ayrshire and Arran
- Country: Scotland
- Sovereign state: United Kingdom
- Post town: KILMARNOCK
- Postcode district: KA1
- Dialling code: 01563
- Police: Scotland
- Fire: Scottish
- Ambulance: Scottish
- UK Parliament: Central Ayrshire
- Scottish Parliament: Carrick, Cumnock and Doon Valley; South Scotland

Symington is a conservation village in South Ayrshire, Scotland. It is located in Symington parish, covering 0.41 square kilometres (3/16 sq mi), and lies close to the A77 road from Ayr to Glasgow. Its church, built in 1160, remains one of the finest examples of a Norman church in Scotland.

== Meaning of place-name ==
The name of the village and parish of Symington is derived from the person of a Norman Knight, Symon Loccard or Lockhart, who held the barony of Symington lands under Walter fitz Alan, the first Steward in 1165. The barony title survives to this day as a Scottish Feudal Barony, held by the descendants of the Bennet Baronets of Grubet (later called Marlfield), a branch of which family also holds the Barony of Auchinleck. The Lockharts of Barr in Galston were a branch of this family. Two other villages in Scotland are named for Simon Lockhart: Symington, South Lanarkshire – located about 38 miles (61 km) from its Ayrshire counterpart and on almost the same latitude, though smaller in size – and Symington in the Scottish Borders. Stevenston in Ayrshire is named for Steven Loccard or Lockart.

== Facilities ==
Symington has a primary school, church, a restaurant, War Memorial, an abandoned water tower and a library. The parish covers 3,736 acres (1,512 hectares) and is mainly a farming community.

Public Transport

Symington is served by the Number 4 bus service, operated by Stagecoach West Scotland. This service runs every 30 minutes on weekdays, offering convenient connections to Ayr via Prestwick Airport and, in the opposite direction, to Glasgow city centre, passing through Kilmarnock via Shortlees/Caprington, Fenwick, Newton Mearns, and Giffnock. The Number 4 bus provides service to the village itself, as well as to the nearby Hansel Village and the Rosemount Riding School, located adjacent to the A77 bypass. The nearest railway station to Symington is Prestwick International Airport, approximately 4 miles (6.4 km) to the south-west.

== Buildings ==
The Wheatsheaf Inn

The Wheatsheaf Inn (NS 38417 31331) is an 18th-century vernacular building that has been a hostelry since its earliest days; in the days of stage coaches the inn was a posting stage on the route to Ayr.

Halfway House

Dating from 1937 this substantial mock-Tudor building was previously a hotel and replaced an inn that was burnt down in 1935.

Broadmeadows House

This Arts & Crafts style house was built in 1931-4 by Noad & Wallace. It is embellished with gargoyles, inscriptions, and other ornamental additions. Broadmeadows is the focus of the residential centre known as Hansel Village.

== Symington's churches ==
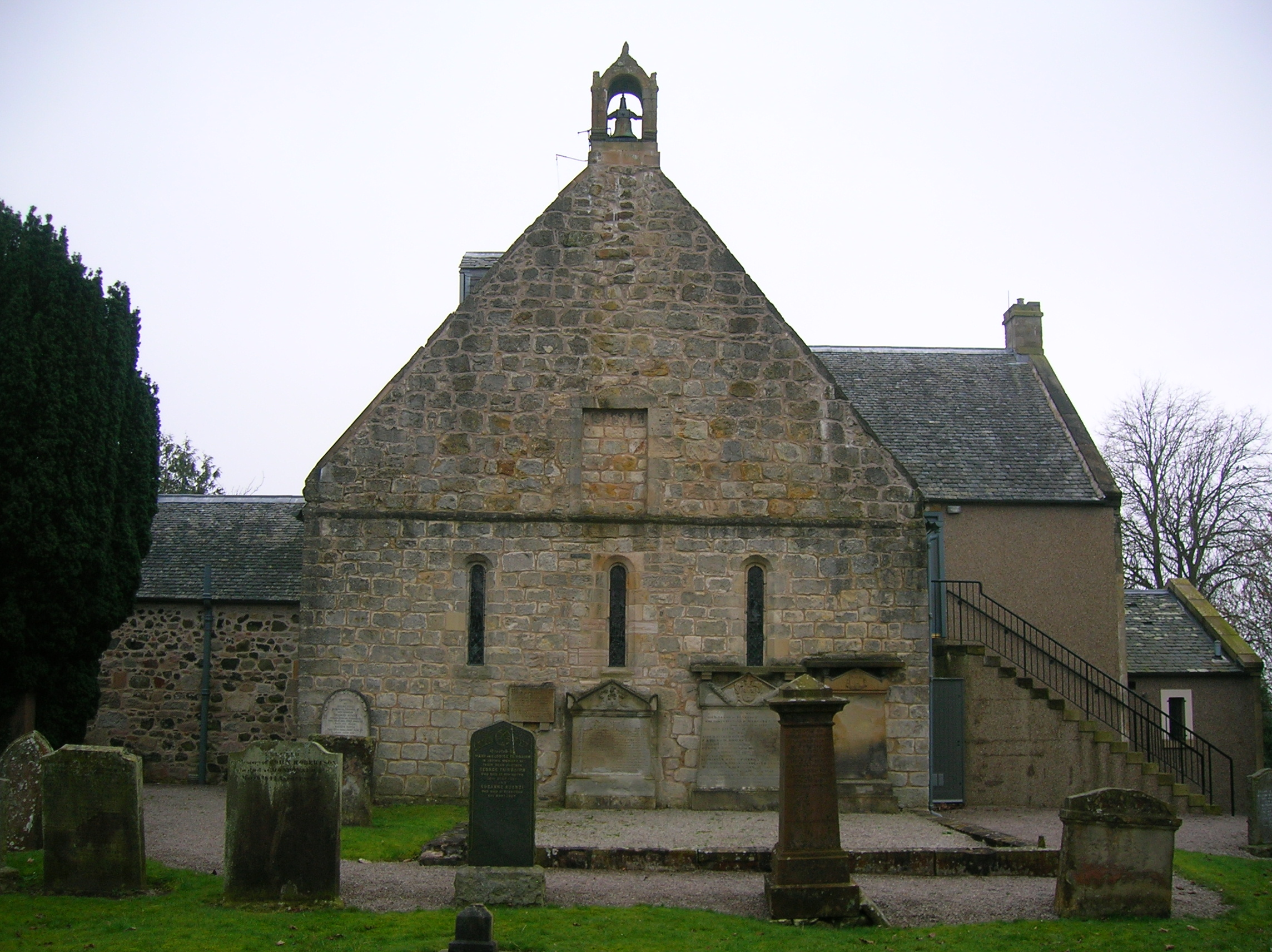
Symington Church showing the 13th century windows.

The parish church was founded in the 12th century by Simon Loccard and is the oldest functioning church in Ayrshire. It belonged to the Trinitarian Monastery at Fail (just outside Tarbolton). The Church was restored in the 18th century and again in 1919. This restoration by leading ecclesiastical architect P. MacGregor Chalmers revealed that the earlier alterations of 1797 had covered up some fine architectural features, including the 13th century windows and the open-work timber roof. Further extensive restoration was carried out by Peter Drummond and Rebecca Cadie of ARP Lorimer between 1996 and 2006. Three windows with semi-circular heads are located in the gable, with heavy hood moulds and dog-tooth ornamentation, the finest of their style in Scotland. The base slab of an aumbrey incorporating a piscina sits as the sill of a south-facing window.

The church received alterations in 1797 which increased the accommodation of the building, but detracted considerably from the unspoilt appearance. A belfry, possibly incorporating some medieval work, was erected on the east gable end in the 17th century. Notable stained glass windows are on display, by Gordon Webster, Douglas Strachan, and others. The patronage of the church passed through several hands and was at length acquired by the Earl of Eglinton. The old manse in Kerrix Road is now known as Symington House (NS 38350 31325).

=== The Free Church ===
The Disruption of 1843 resulted in the establishment of a second church, now demolished, at the junction of Main Street and Symington Road. The minister of the parish, George Orr, and his congregation "came out" and, for a time, worshipped in this vacant public house adapted for the purpose, whilst the minister lived in a rented room in a nearby farm house. The new Free Church and schoolhouse were built in February 1844.

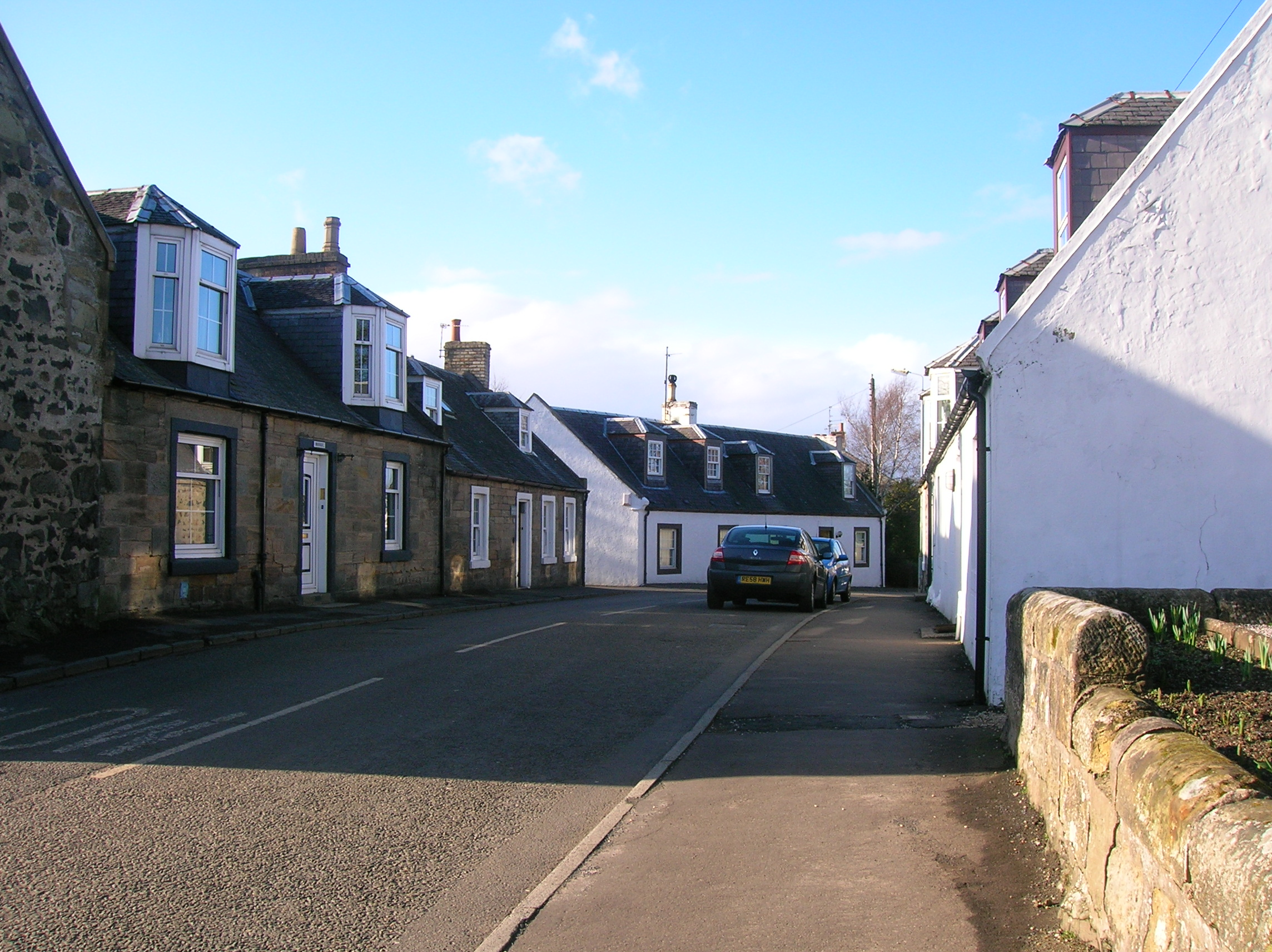
Main Street, Symington, South Ayrshire, Scotland. The old Post Office and Smithy were on the right.

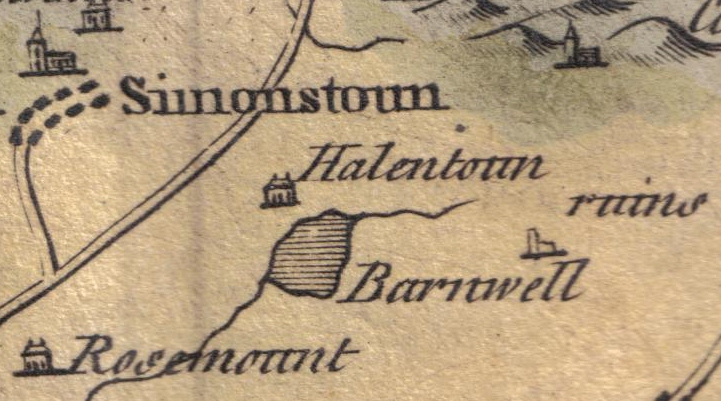
Symington and Helenton Loch

== Country houses ==
The country seats were Coodham, with its well wooded grounds, sizeable ornamental lake, and once splendid gardens, 1 mile (1.5 kilometres) northeast; Dankeith, 1 mile (1.5 kilometres) north; Townend, 1/2 mile (800 metres) west; and Rosemount, 1 1/2 miles (2.5 kilometres) southwest.

Coodham

In 1826 Margaret Fairlie, widow of William Fairlie of Calcutta built the mansion house and in total expended £20,000 on various improvements. She renamed the estate Williamfield in honour of her late husband. In the 1870s William Houldsworth owned the property and added a new wing, conservatory and a private chapel designed by Alfred Waterhouse. It was bought by a religious order after WWII was known as 'Fatima House, Coodham' and used as a retreat house with a new wing added. In the 1980s the house was put on the market. Various plans for its redevelopment failed and in the meantime the house deteriorated and was vandalised and burnt out. The house was eventually rebuilt as individual flats.

In 1850 James Ogilvie Fairlie of Coodham organised a meeting at the Red Lion in Prestwick of fifty-seven gentlemen from the West of Scotland, leading to the formation of the Prestwick Golf Club and as a direct result in 1860 the first Open Championship was held.

Dankeith

First recorded as Dalketh or Freris Dalkeithe this property was given to the Black Friars of Ayr and held by them until the Reformation. Alane of Lawdor had given the lands in memory of his wife. The Cunninghames obtained the lands in 1614 and they held the property until the 1690s, when William Kelso acquired it. In 1839 Lieutenant-Colonel William Kelso was the owner of Dankeith. The Factor's house of the Dankeith Estate was Craigowan House in Brewlands Road. Dankeith House itself was built in 1893, incorporating an earlier building. The estate had a fine range of hothouses. In May 1857 Dankeith was rented by Janet Story, wife of Dr Story. She published her Early Reminiscences in which she comments on her servants, in particular she refers to the daughter of a local gamekeeper in glowing terms she is perfectly lovely; just seventeen, tall with the figure of a nymph, quantities of golden hair, a skin like milk and eyes like the pearls of a forget-me-not. I never saw anyone more exquisite ..

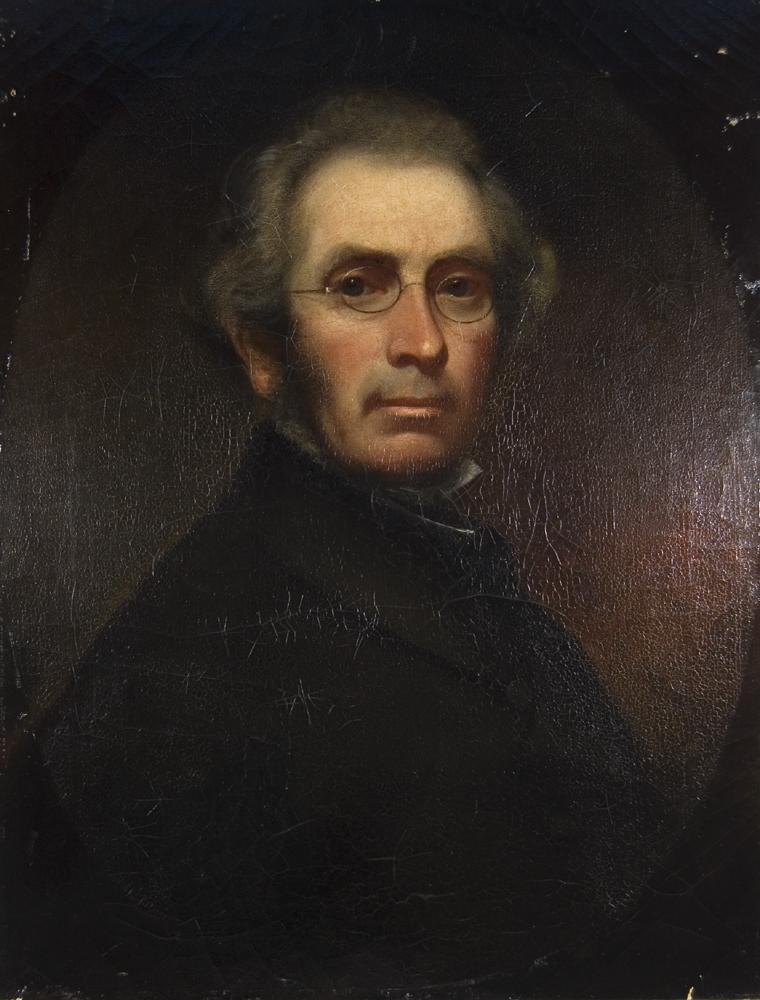
John Kelso Hunter

John Kelso Hunter (1802–1873) was born at Gillhead Cottage, close to Symington cemetery, on the Dankeith Estate and was at first employed here during his indenture as a herd boy, his father being a gardener. John moved to the village of Dundonald and became a respected artist, noted for portraiture. In 1847 he exhibited at the Royal Academy in London before becoming a regular exhibitor at the Royal Scottish Academy for the next 25 years. Hunter published two books: ‘Retrospective of an Artist’s Life’ (1868), and ‘Life Studies of Character’. He is buried in the Southern Necropolis in Glasgow.

In 1932 Dankeith was fire damaged, but restored. In WW2 it was used by the RAF and secret planning meetings for D-day and other allied operations took place here. In 1948 the Roman Catholic Passionist Fathers acquired the property as a retreat, however they sold the property circa 1968 and the site is now a leisure centre, with caravans surrounding the house.

Townend House and Cottage

Hugh Glover held the lands of Townend circa 1701-4 and in 1733 William Kelso of Dankeith sold the lands to George Boyd of East Overloan Farm. William Hay Boyd, Esq. of Her Majesty's 20th Regiment of Infantry in the Crimea and was the owner of Townend House (NS 37652 31552) and estate in 1839. Townend is an 18th-century building with a Victorian Italianate wing. A dated lintel in the walled garden may have come from an earlier building on the site; the old stables, were converted into a small dwelling in the 1960s. In recent times Townend Cottage has functioned as a nursing home, Townend Cottage, circa 1810, situated in the village was its former dower house. The Hay-Boyds gave land for the village hall, a school, and a garden next to the church.

Rosemount

Dr. Fullerton of Rosemount returned from India, circa 1770 and rebuilt the mansion-house at Rosemount, previously known as Goldring, improved the cultivation of the land, and ornamented the grounds with the belts of plantings that are apparent today (2011). The site at Rosemount today functions as an equestrian centre, comprising stables and a livery yard, and the house itself as a place of residence.

== Other notable residents ==
- John Rae Covenanting preacher - died in prison on the Bass Rock.
- Prof John Stirling Young FRSE (1894-1971) pathologist
- Vice-Admiral Sir Thomas Baird (born 1924).

== Ordnance Gazetteer entry ==
In 1882–4, Francis Groome's Ordnance Gazetteer of Scotland described Symington thus:

Symington, a village and a parish in the NW of Kyle district, Ayrshire. The village stands 3½ miles NNE of Monkton station, and 6 SSW of Kilmarnock, under which it has a post office.

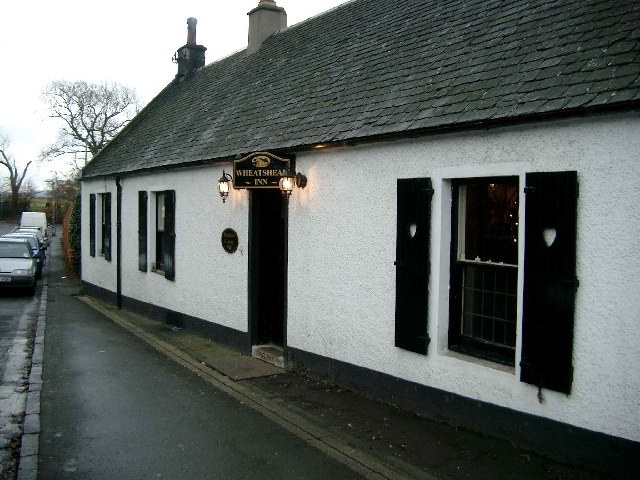
The Wheatsheaf Inn.

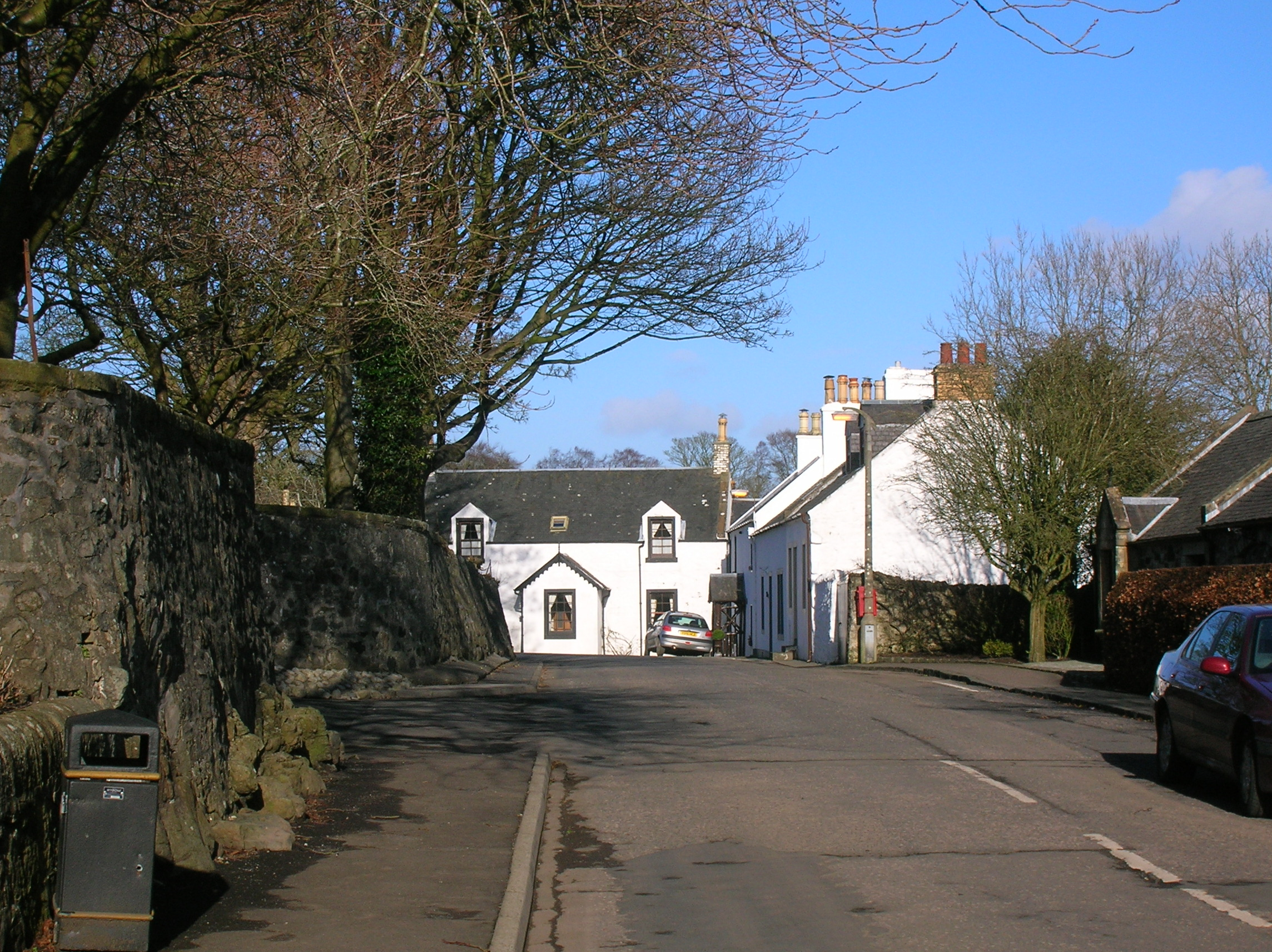
Brewlands Road.

The parish is bounded NE by Riccarton, E by Craigie, S and SW by Monkton, and W and NW by Dundonald. Its utmost length, from NNE to SSW, is 43/8 miles; its breadth varies between 1 and 2¼ miles; and its area is 3736½ acres, of which 11½ are water. In the extreme S the surface declines to close on 100 feet above sea-level; and thence it rises gently to a maximum altitude of 333 feet at a point 21/3 furlongs NNE of the church, from which it sinks again to 201 feet near the Riccarton border. It thus exhibits a pleasing diversity of swells and slopes, and contains many vantage-grounds commanding extensive views of great part of Ayrshire, the Firth of Clyde, and the Isle of Arran. Trap rock has been quarried for road metal, and sandstone for building; whilst limestone and coal exist, but not under profitable conditions. The soil, in general, is of a clayey character., on a hard subsoil. Nearly all the land, except about 300 acres under wood, is regularly or occasionally in tillage. The principal residences are Coodham, Dankeith, Rosemount, and Townend; and 5 proprietors hold each an annual value of £500 and upwards, 5 of between £100 and £500. Symington is in the presbytery of Ayr and the synod of Glasgow and Ayr; the living is worth £350. The parish church is an old building with Norman features, and, as entirely remodelled in 1880, contains 359 sittings. There is also a Free church; and the public school, with accommodation for 132 children, had (1884) an average attendance of 85, and a grant of £69, 16s. Valuation (1860) £6560, (1885) £7104, 5s. 3d. Pop. (1801) 668, (1841) 918, (1861) 855, (1871) 792, (1881) 697.—Ord. Sur., shs. 22, 14, 1865-63.

== Archaeology ==
A moot hill once stood at the foot of the village and upon its removal some iron arrow-heads and horn combs were found. Helenton Moot Hill may have been a fortified site at one time and the Helenton Loch with its associated mill were nearby.

== The Slough of Despond ==
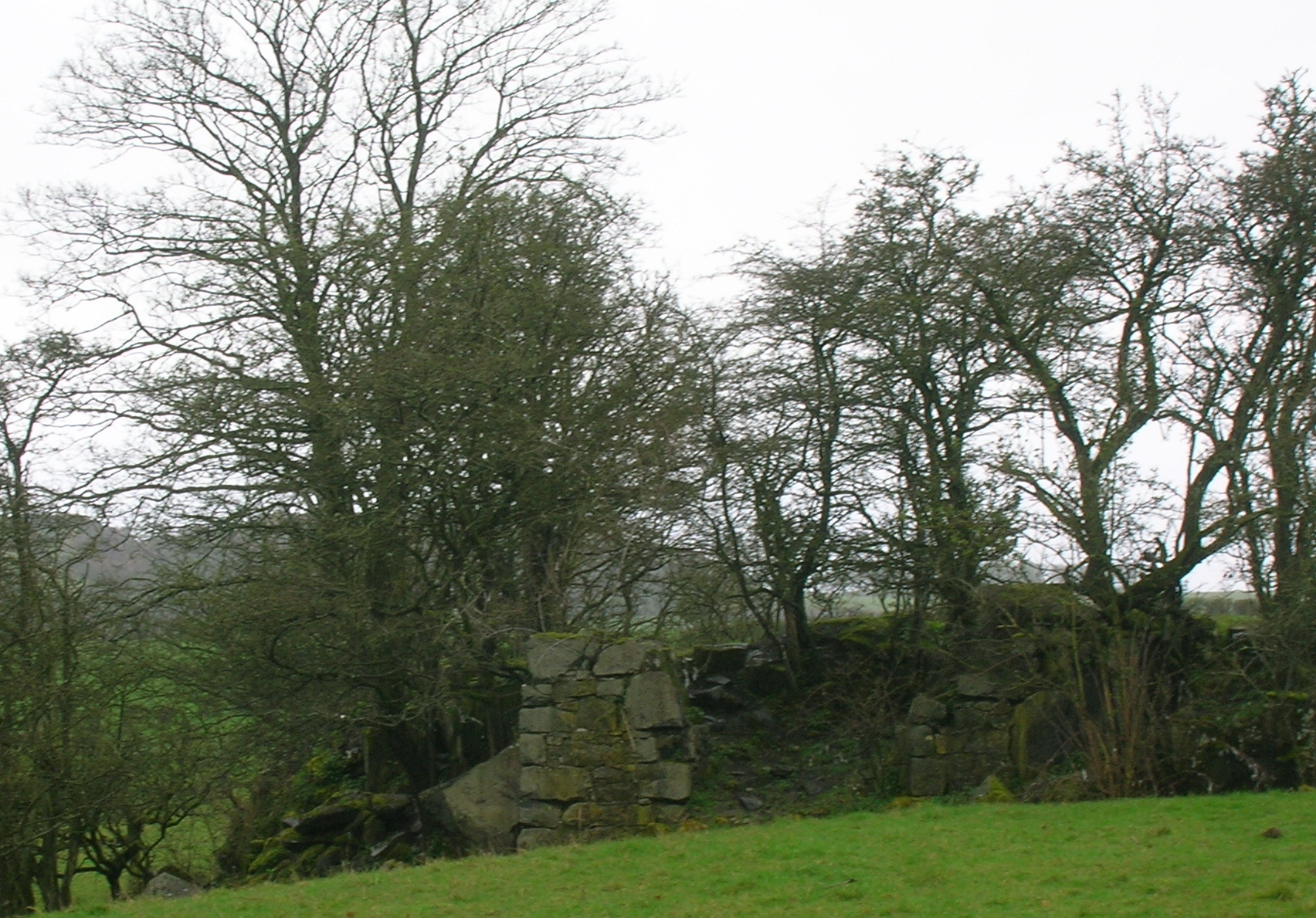
The old limekiln

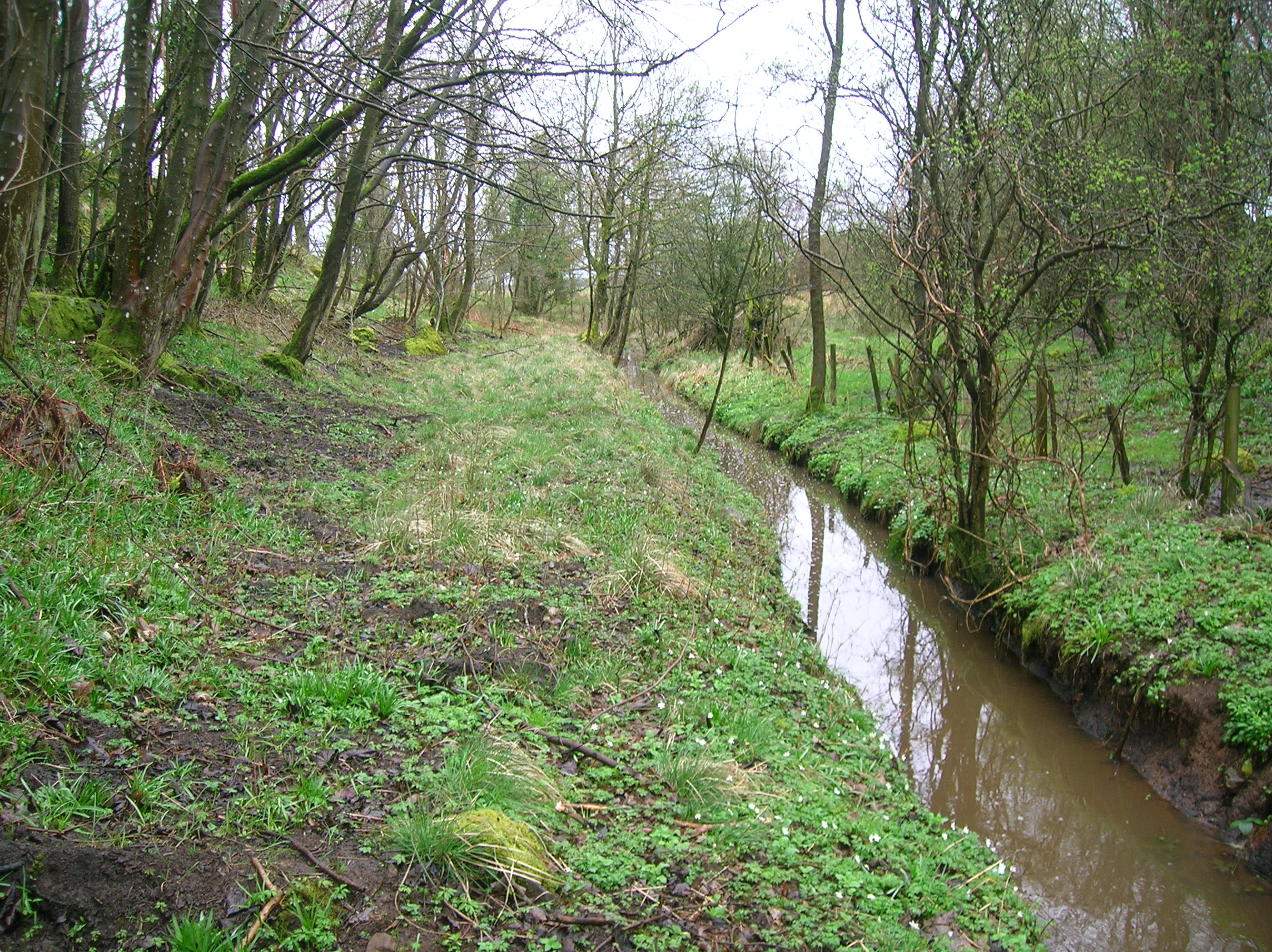
The Slough Burn in the Slough of Despond.

On the boundary of Dundonald and Symington parishes lies an area known as the 'Slough of Despond'. The original Slough of Despond is a deep bog in John Bunyan's allegory The Pilgrim's Progress into which the character Christian sinks under the weight of his sins and his sense of guilt for them.

The burn in this area, rising near the old Broadhirst Farm, has long been known as the Slough, the Scots equivalent spelling is Sleugh, meaning a marsh or quagmire. It is not known how the name 'Slough of Despond' was added to the area, however it is recorded since the mid 19th century and may be linked to the nearby limekilns that were generally notorious for the acrid 'hell-like' smoke that issued from them.

The Slough Burn still rises from the marshy area below the Broadhirst Woods, however the limestone quarry that served the limekilns is now abandoned, surviving as an area rich in wildlife, containing old woodland indicator plants such as Wood Anemone (Anemone nemorosa), Bluebell (Hyacinthoides non-scripta), Wood Sorrel (Oxalis acetosella), Dog's Mercury (Mercurialis perennis), Herb Robert (Geranium robertianum) and other species. The Slough Burn runs down past Dankeith House, Templeton and Fortacres, Todrigs and Caprington, to join the River Irvine near Gatehead.

== Micro-history ==
Freestone and whinstone are the underlying rocks and the church itself stands on an elevated outcrop.

The parish covered 3725 acres and had a population of 697 in 1881.

== See also ==
- Helenton Loch
- Clevens Loch, Ayrshire
- Murder of James Young
