= David Kinnell =

Scottish professional golfer

- Kinnell, c. 1912

Personal information
- Nationality: Scotland
- Born: 1879 Leven, Fife, Scotland
- Died: January 1951 (aged 71-72)

Career
- Sport: Golf
- Status: Professional
- Professional wins: 1

Best results in major championships
- Masters Tournament: DNP
- PGA Championship: DNP
- U.S. Open: DNP
- The Open Championship: T5: 1908

David Kinnell (1879 – January 1951) was a Scottish professional golfer who played in the late 19th and early 20th century. Kinnell had two top-10 finishes in the Open Championship. His best performance came in the 1908 Open Championship when he finished tied for fifth place. He also had a good performance in the 1898 Open Championship, finishing in the sixth position.

== Early life and career ==
Kinnell was born in Leven, Fife, Scotland, in 1879. He served as the head professional at Leven Thistle Golf Club. Appointed professional to succeed his brother James at Prestwick St Nicholas, he laid out an 18-hole course for the Ladies Club in 1906 with Charlie Hunter. He established and operated a club-making business in Prestwick with his brother called D & J Kinnell. He also designed the 9-hole seaside portion of the Girvan Golf Club.

== Golf career ==
=== 1898 Open Championship ===
The 1898 Open Championship was held 8–9 June at Prestwick Golf Club in Prestwick, South Ayrshire, Scotland. According to newspaper accounts at the time, there were a number of "hopeless competitors" and "second-class golfers" entering the Open, so a cut was introduced for the first time to reduce the number of players on the final day. All entries played 36 holes on the first day with all those within 19 strokes of the leader making the cut and playing 36 holes on the final day, with the additional provision that the final day's field had to contain at least 32 professionals. Kinnell was not one of the "hopeless competitors" and proved his skill by shooting 80-77-79-80=316 and finished in sixth place. He took home £10 in prize money.

=== 1908 Open Championship ===
The 1908 Open Championship was held 18–19 June and was also played at Prestwick Golf Club. Kinnell carded rounds of 75-73-80-78=306 and tied for fifth place with Harry Vardon. He won £7 10s in prize money.

=== Retirement ===
Kinnell retired at age 57 having been professional at St Nicholas for 34 years. He then became the caretaker of the Prestwick putting green.

== Death and legacy ==
Kinnell died in January 1951 in Scotland. He is best remembered for having two top-10 finishes in the Open Championship.

== Tournament wins ==
- 1910 Dunlop Cup

== Results in major championships ==
Tournament	1898	1899	1900	1901	1902	1903	1904	1905	1906	1907	1908
The Open Championship	6	DNP	CUT	DNP	DNP	T18	DNP	DNP	11	DNP	T5

Note: Kinnell played only in The Open Championship.

DNP = Did not play
CUT = missed the half-way cut
"T" indicates a tie for a place
Yellow background for top-10
