= John Hunter (golfer) =

Scottish professional golfer

- Hunter, c. 1899

Personal information
- Nationality: Scotland
- Born: 1871 Prestwick, Scotland
- Died: 29 November 1946 (aged 74–75) Prestwick, Scotland
- Spouse: Isabella Hunter
- Children: 4

Career
- Sport: Golf
- Status: Professional
- Professional wins: 1

Best results in major championships
- Masters Tournament: DNP
- PGA Championship: DNP
- U.S. Open: DNP
- The Open Championship: 8th: 1898

John Hunter (1871 – 29 November 1946) was a Scottish professional golfer who played in the late 19th century and early 20th century. Hunter finished in eighth place in the 1898 Open Championship. He won the first Scottish Professional Championship at Panmure Golf Club in 1907 with a score of 304 over four rounds, which included a record round of 71 in the third round.

== Early life ==
Hunter was born in Prestwick, Scotland, in 1871. He was the son of Charles Hunter, keeper of the greens at the Prestwick course and also one of the first eight competitors in the inaugural 1860 Open Championship. Hunter's father was first hired as Old Tom Morris's successor but also had a short stint at Royal Blackheath in the 1860s.

Hunter apprenticed as a club maker under the direction of Old Tom Morris at St Andrews. He returned to Prestwick in 1893 and joined his father in his club and ball making business. Some clubs they produced are marked "C & J Hunter" while others are marked with the name of one or the other of the Hunters.

He had two brothers, David and William, who both emigrated to the United States and worked as golf professionals. David worked at the Essex Country Club in New Jersey for 29 years. Hunter also came to the U.S. for a short time but returned to live in Scotland.

== Golf career ==
=== 1898 Open Championship ===
The 1898 Open Championship was the 38th Open Championship, held 8–9 June at Prestwick Golf Club in Prestwick, South Ayrshire, Scotland. Harry Vardon won the Championship for the second time, a stroke ahead of Willie Park, Jr., the 1887 and 1889 winner. Hunter finished alone in eighth place with rounds of 82-79-81-77=319 and won £7 10s in prize money.

== Death and legacy ==
Hunter died on 29 November 1946 in Prestwick, Scotland. He is best remembered as a maker of fine golf clubs and for a top-10 finish in the 1898 Open Championship. He also won the 1907 Scottish PGA Championship.

== Results in major championships ==
Tournament	1893	1894	1895	1896	1897	1898	1899	1900	1901	1902	1903	1904	1905	1906	1907	1908	1909	1910	1911	1912	1913	1914
The Open Championship	T15	DNP	T38	T18	WD	8	DNP	DNP	CUT	DNP	T22	DNP	DNP	DNP	DNP	DNP	DNP	DNP	DNP	DNP	DNP	WD

Note: Hunter played only in The Open Championship.

DNP = did not play
CUT = missed the half-way cut
WD = withdrew
"T" indicates a tie for a place
Yellow background for top-10
