= Cleven =

Cleven is both a surname and a given name. Notable people with the name include:

- Carol C. Cleven (1928–2015), American politician
- Endre Johannes Cleven (1874–1916), Norwegian-born Canadian classical musician and military officer
- Gale Cleven (1918–2006), American World War II pilot and colonel
- Hans-Dieter Cleven, former financial advisor to Boris Becker who sued Becker, claiming he was owed $41 million
- Harry Cleven, director and co-screenwriter of Angel (2016 film)
- Vivienne Cleven (born 1968), Indigenous Australian fiction author
- Cleven Goudeau (c. 1932–2015), American art director and cartoonist
- Cleven Wanabo (born 1976), Surinamese footballer

== See also ==
- Clevens Loch, Ayrshire, former loch in South Ayrshire, Scotland
- Kleven (disambiguation)
- Chiavenna, an Italian comune known as Claven in the Romansh language and Cläven or Kleven in archaic German
