= Loans, South Ayrshire =

Coordinates: 55.5511°N 4.6249°W

Loans
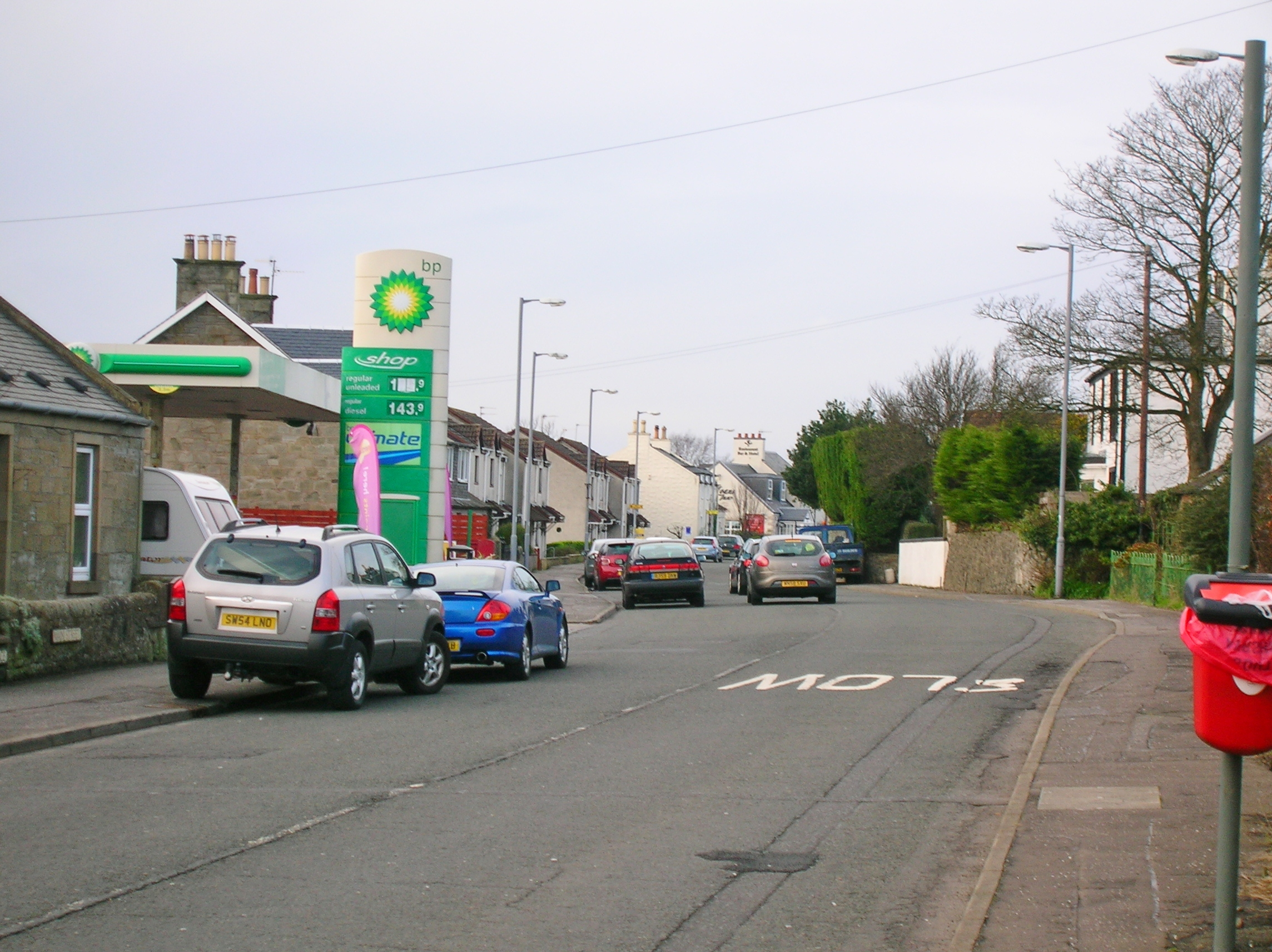
- Main Street, Loans

- Location within South Ayrshire
- Population: 750 (2020)
- OS grid reference: NS3451031739
- Council area: South Ayrshire
- Lieutenancy area: Ayrshire and Arran
- Country: Scotland
- Sovereign state: United Kingdom
- Post town: TROON
- Postcode district: KA10
- Dialling code: 01292
- Police: Scotland
- Fire: Scottish
- Ambulance: Scottish
- UK Parliament: Central Ayrshire
- Scottish Parliament: Carrick, Cumnock and Doon Valley

Loans is a village in South Ayrshire near Troon, Scotland. It is located in Dundonald parish on the A759 at the junction with the B746 and a minor road to Dundonald.

== Etymology ==
Recorded as Loans, Lones, or Lons, the name of the village may have no connection with lending and be derived from the green loans or loaning (a piece of soft, rough ground) around the Bushie and Craiksland Burns, which joined each other at the foot the old orchard at Crossburn. A 'loan' can simply refer to a 'lane' and as such is a common placename element, which would be particularly appropriate to Loans, which is at a crossroads. Before the encloser of fields, a loan or strip of grass was left that ran through the arable part of a farm or farms, linking it with the common grazing ground of a clachan, serving both as a pasture and a driving road. A lon can mean a loan of land granted by the king, from which an income is derived to benefit an establishment or simply the Land of King Robert.

== History ==
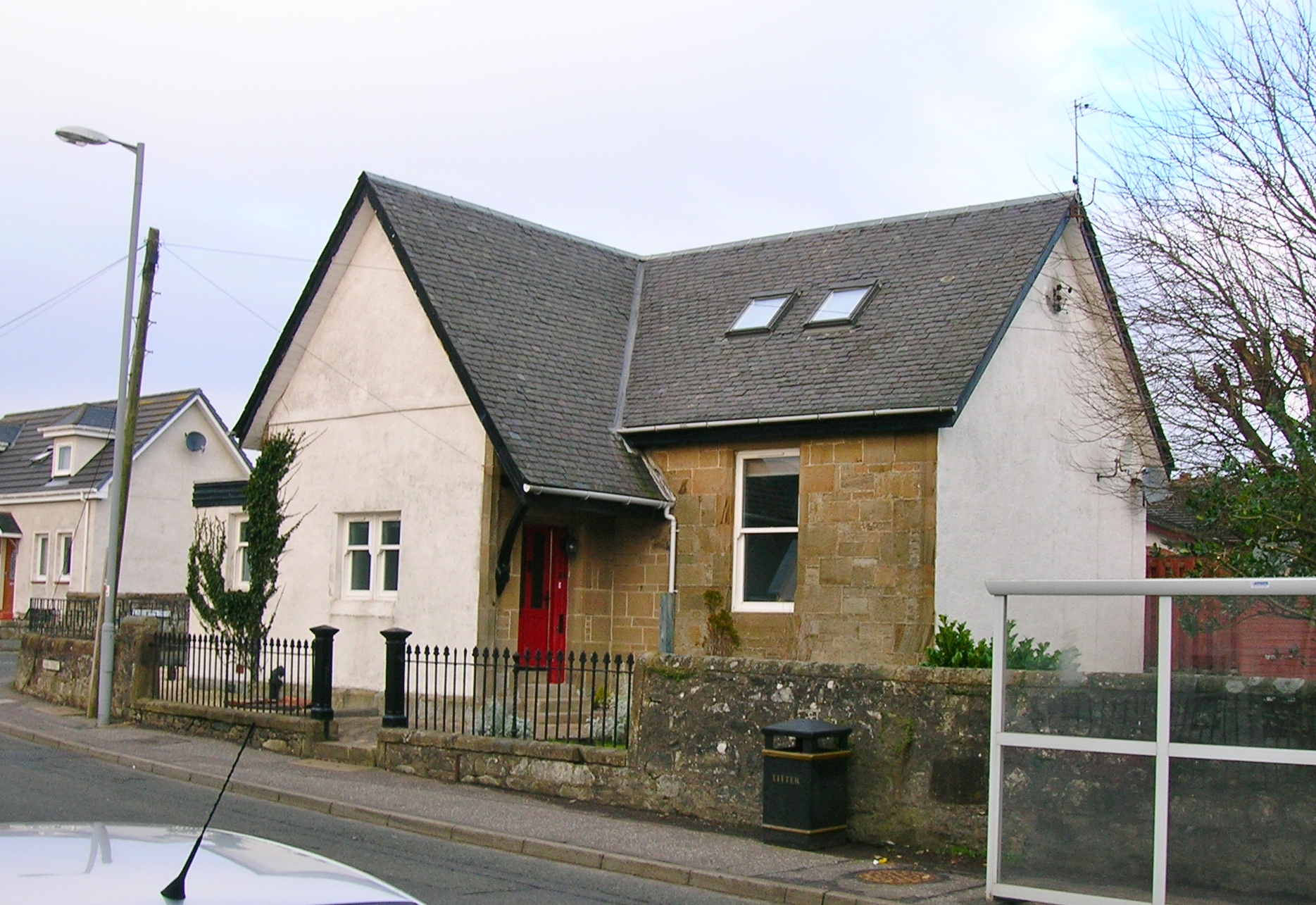
The old school.

During feudal times, Robertloan House and Hillhouse were the seats of the local lairds. Fairs were held here in June and October of each year. In 1806 five small steadings comprised the settlement of Loans.

The A78 formerly ran through the settlement when it followed the course of the Irvine to Ayr turnpike. After the death of Colonel William Fullarton in 1808, the Fourth Duke of Portland purchased the Lands of Fullarton that included Loans, the Lady Isle and Crosbie.

A school had been established at the Darley prior to 1840, however it had closed by 1866. In 1877 a school was built in the village itself. Teachers included Miss Jessie A. Meikle, Miss Shaw, Miss Baird, and Miss Martha Meikle.

Some of the old houses in Loans were little better than smuggling vaults, having double walls and many cargoes from the Isle of Man and Northern Ireland ended up hidden in the village. All around Loans, especially in sand hills, were 'brandy holes', being large pits the size of rooms used for storing brandy casks.

The village smithy was once situated on the main street, as was the post office.

The name Corseburn is first recorded at the time of the Highway Act 1835. Crossburn Bridge was situated in the formation of the highway, constructed over what had previously been a ford of the Craiksland or Sculloch Burn crossed the highway as a ford until the Corseburn or Crossburn Bridge was built.

The Loans toll, at the foot of Crossburn Avenue came into use during the early years of the 18th century. There were two toll bars, both made of pine. These gates were leased out together or as separate entities. The village tolls added to their income by selling whisky and ale.

=== Cartographic evidence ===
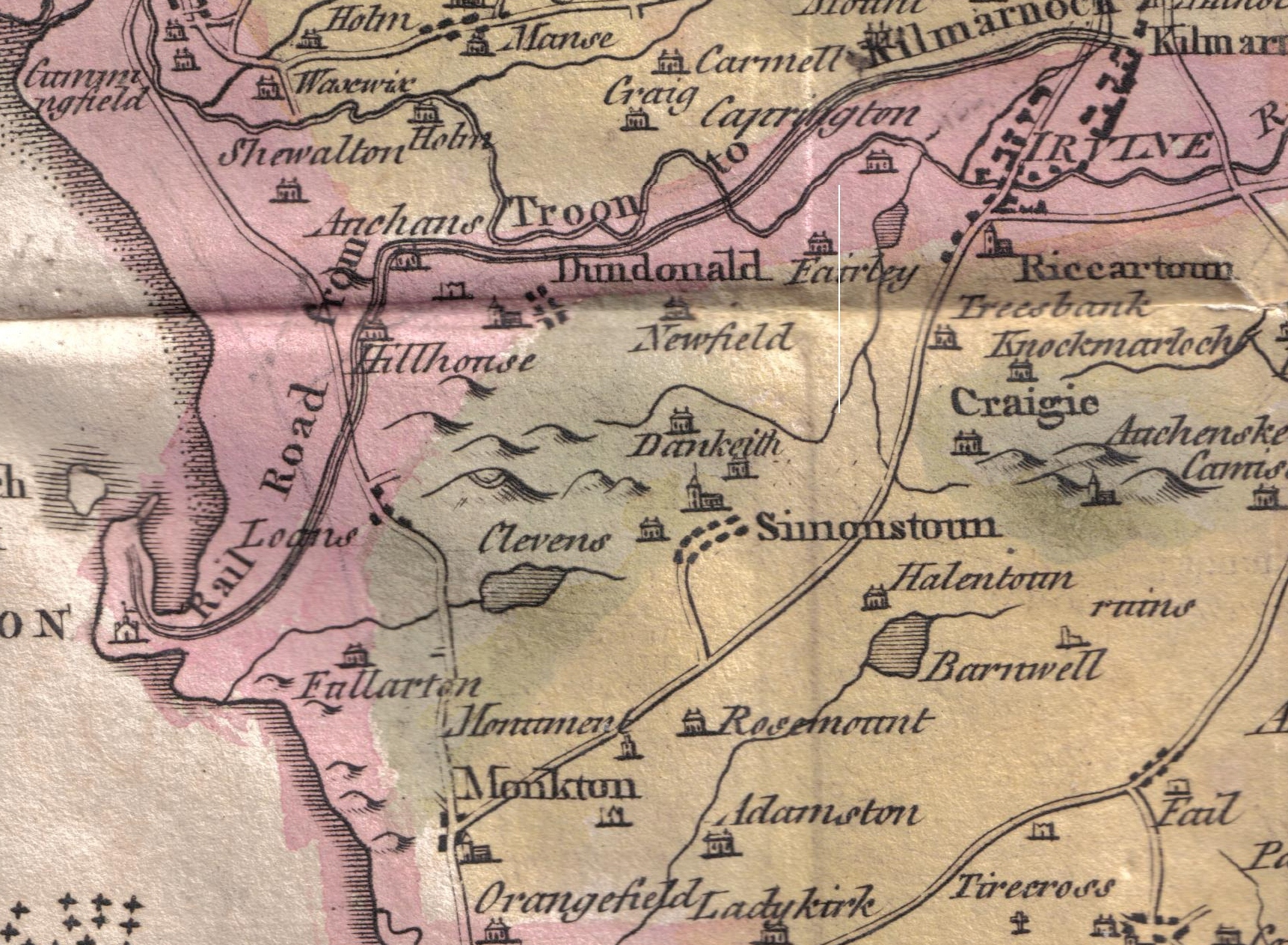
Map showing Loans village in the early 19th century.

Blaeu's map of 1654 shows a settlement names "Lons" In 1747 Loans is marked as such with four enclosed areas of land and dwellings with Scallachmill nearby on a road from Fullarton to Irvine. By 1775 Loans is shown as a cluster of buildings on the Irvine to Ayr road with a road now also running to Dundonald. By 1832 Loans is shown with a toll and two additional roads, both running towards Troon and the coast. The 1857 OS Map shows a number of buildings at Sculloch Mill, Robertloan House and two toll bars and associated houses. By 1897 the school and smithy are shown with a nursery with greenhouses established near the crossroads.

=== Robertloan ===
Robertland was originally a dwelling in the medieval clachan of Loans, Robertloan being the old name for Loans. Robertloan House in the centre of the village was the home of William Dickie, last of the lairds who sold the estate to the Duke of Portland in 1861. Later associated with the Guthrie family, Robertloan was the headquarters of the Kilmarnock Dairy Institute in 1906.

=== Leprosy ===
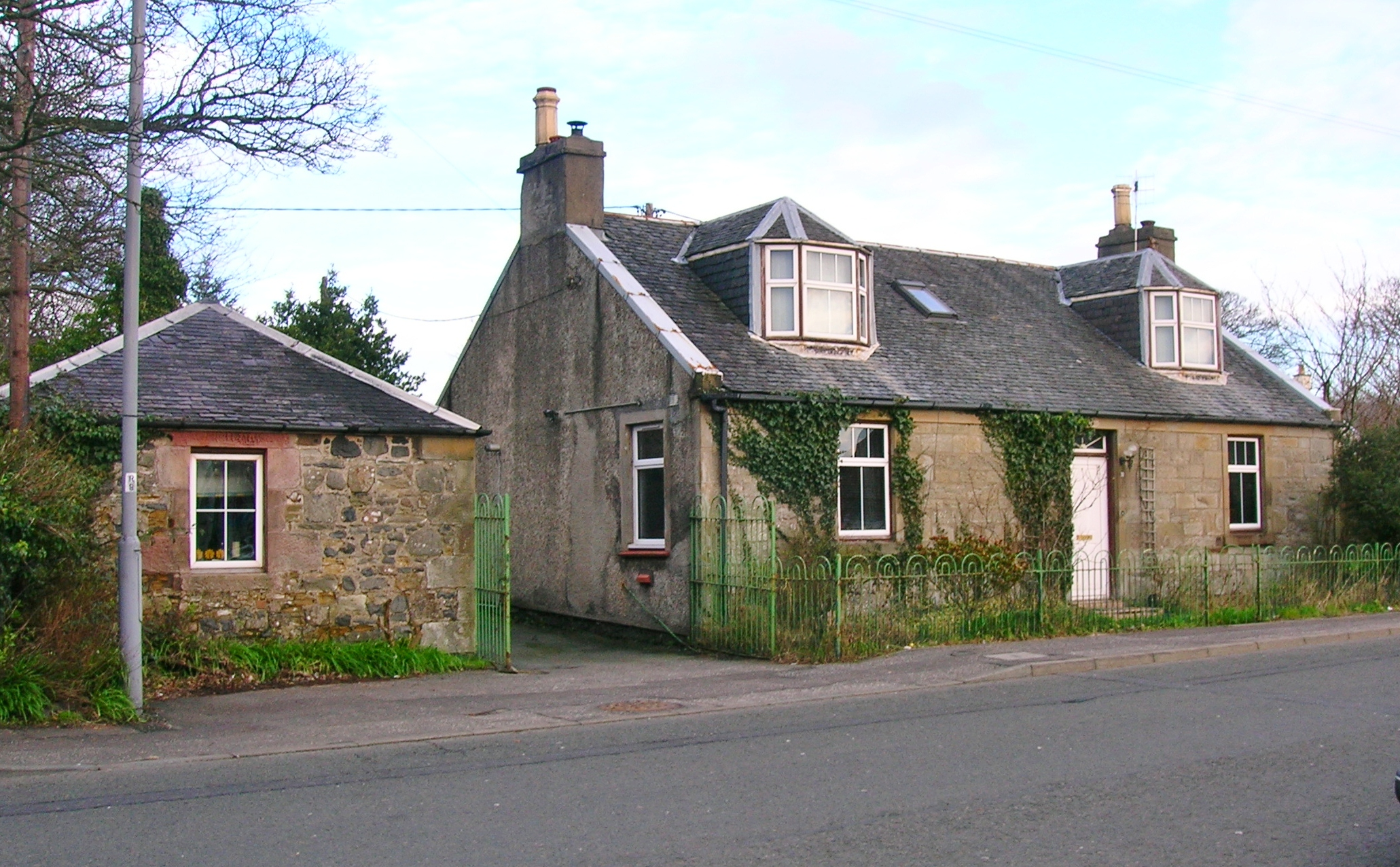
The old smithy.

In the 14th century Robert the Bruce is thought to have suffered from leprosy, psoriasis or some other skin ailment and is reputed to have drunk from a brook at Prestwick's "Bruce's Well". The apparent healing effects of the waters caused him to establish a lazar house, or hospital for lepers. The king endowed the establishment with the income from the lands of Loans, ensuring its survival. The villagers of Loans were required to support eight lepers, each of whom was to have, annually, "eight bolls of meal and eight merks". The meal for the lepers was ground at the nearby Sculloch Mill.

When the leper hospital closed and in the 1730s the endowment was taken over by the Wallaces of Craigie, who continued to meet the obligation, but it was later purchased by a writer from Edinburgh at a judicial sale, selling it on to the magistrates of Ayr for £300, who used it to provide for the inmates of the Ayr poorhouse. As late as 1882 three farmers in the Robertloan accepted responsibility for this ancient tax, and refunded the full assessment of meal and merks to their own tenants and employees. The endowment continued to be paid to the poor of Ayr and Prestwick until 1924, although leprosy had long ceased to exist in Scotland.

== Archaeology ==
A stone celt or axe was found in a drain at Loans. An old field boundary and rig and furrow remnants have been found at Loans. In the 1970s a grey flint flake was found in ploughed soil and over forty patinated and unpatinated flint blades were discovered nearby. An earthwork is present (NS352323) in a nearby field, but it has been almost entirely ploughed out. Probably of a rectangular plan it may have been a medieval homestead settlement with a moat.

Wardlaw Hill fort on the highest of the Clevens Hills lies above the Loans to Dundonald road and Kemp Law Dun is a vitrified fort dating from the Iron Age lying in Dundonald Woods. It was formed from a circular rampart and ditch. A mound in the centre was once an Ordnance Survey triangulation station.

== Micro-history ==
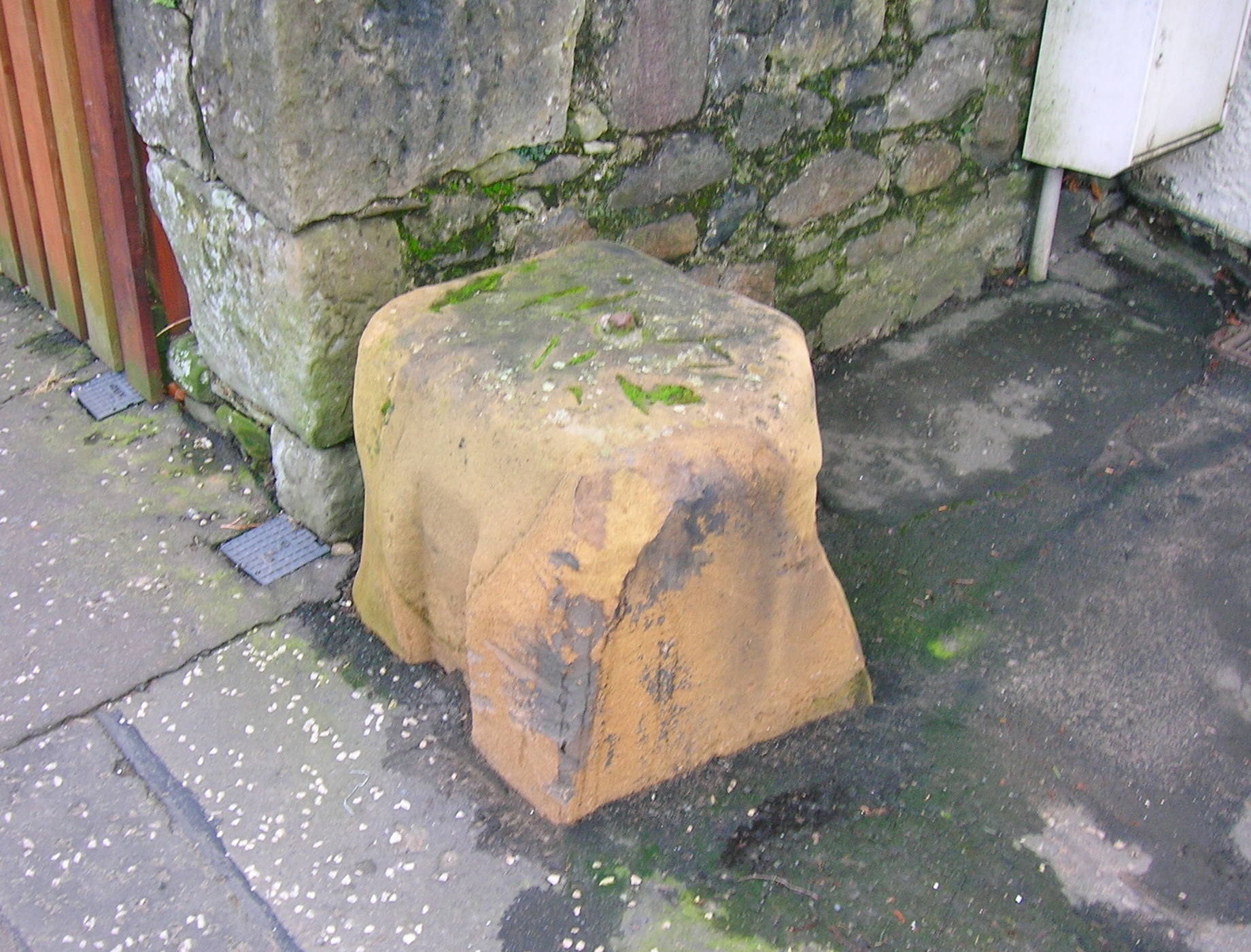
Old cheese press used as a mounting block.

Highgrove Hotel, previously known as Dallam Towers, lies nearby on the road to Dundonald.

Crossburn House is dated 1832 on a stone gate pier. The rear wing is probably 18th century.

The Old Loans Inn was a coaching inn that was renovated in 2009 and now provides hotel accommodation and fine dining.

An old cheese press stone was used as a mounting block and is still located outside the old post office.

== See also ==
- Clevens Loch, Ayrshire
