= James Ogilvie Fairlie =

Scottish golfer and landowner

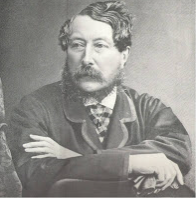
- Fairlie in a formal pose, c. 1862

Personal information
- Full name: James Ogilvie Fairlie
- Nationality: Scotland
- Born: 10 October 1809 Calcutta, Bengal Presidency, British India (present-day Kolkata, West Bengal, India)
- Died: 5 December 1870 (aged 61) Coodham, Symington, Ayrshire, Scotland
- Spouses: Anne Eliza MacLeod (m. 1840) Elizabeth Constance Houison-Crauford (m. 1845)
- Children: 9

Career
- Sport: Golf
- Status: Amateur

Best results in major championships
- Masters Tournament: DNP
- PGA Championship: DNP
- U.S. Open: DNP
- The Open Championship: 8th: 1861

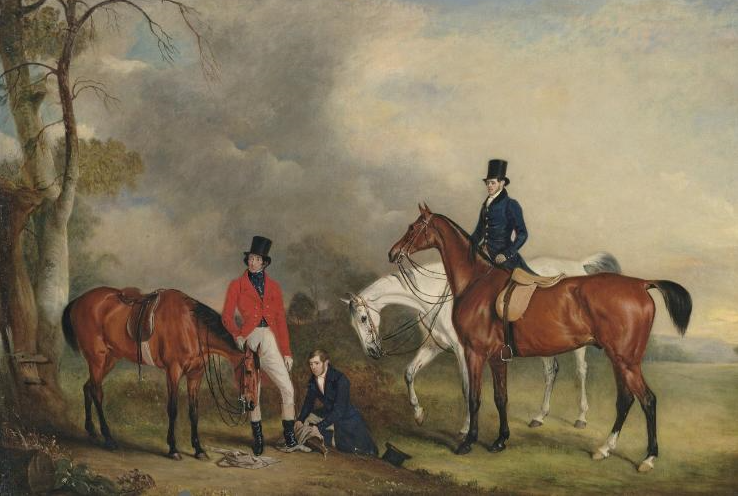
Fairlie with his grooms and the three principal steeplechasers in his stables; painted by John Ferneley, c. 1840

James Ogilvie Fairlie (10 October 1809 – 5 December 1870) was a Scottish amateur golfer and landowner. He is best remembered as the principal organiser of the first Open Championship in 1860. Fairlie was a founding member of Prestwick Golf Club in 1851.

Fairlie served as the captain of the Royal and Ancient Golf Club of St Andrews and was the principal organiser of the inaugural 1860 Open Championship held at Prestwick. Fairlie was a friend and frequent playing partner of the Earl of Eglinton, Archibald Montgomerie, who donated the Challenge Belt that was awarded to the Open Championship winner. He was a mentor to Old Tom Morris who named his son, James Ogilvie Fairlie Morris, after him.

Playing on the Old Course at St Andrews, Fairlie won the Silver Cross Medal in 1849, 1854 and 1860. He won the Gold Medal (King's Medal) in 1857 and 1862. He placed eighth in the 1861 Open Championship, the first championship open to both amateurs and professionals.

== Early life ==
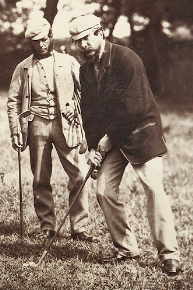
Fairlie (left) with Old Tom Morris, c. 1850

Fairlie was born in Calcutta, West Bengal, India, on 10 October 1809. He was the third son of William Fairlie and Margaret Fairlie (née Ogilvie) of Coodham, Symington, Ayrshire. He took to the links as a youngster and quickly became an accomplished golfer. He was educated at Charterhouse, Harrow and St John's College, Cambridge.

His father was a partner in the banking firm of Fairlie, Bonner & Co. which was subsequently renamed Hartwell, Innes, Clerk, Brazier & Co. In William Fairlie's last will and testament dated 9 October 1823, he bequeathed to his son the sum of £19,000 which was his share of the residuary estate, money that would not be his to spend until reaching the age of 25.

In later life, as a result of his wealth and social status, his name was often printed with the suffix 'esquire'. Fairlie enjoyed participating in steeplechase and maintained a stable with several horses. At age 30 he was a participant in the Eglinton Tournament which was a re-enactment of a medieval joust and revel held between 28 and 30 August 1839. It was funded and organised by Archibald Montgomerie, 13th Earl of Eglinton, and took place at Eglinton Castle in Ayrshire. Fairlie was the "Knight of the Golden Lion".

== Golf career ==
=== Open Championship organiser ===
Fairlie was the principal organiser of the first Open Championship held at Prestwick in 1860. With the untimely death of Allan Robertson, aged 42 in 1859, Prestwick members decided to conduct a challenge the following year that would determine the land's greatest golfer.

In a proposed competition for a "challenge belt", Fairlie sent out a series of invitations to Aberdeen, Blackheath, Bruntsfield, Carnoustie Panmure, Dirleton Castle, Leven, Montrose, Musselburgh, North Berwick, Perth and St Andrews. These clubs were invited to send "their two best professional players", who were to be "known and respectable caddies" to play in a tournament to be held on 17 October 1860.

=== 1861 Open Championship ===
After organising the inaugural 1860 Open Championship, Fairlie played in the second Open Championship. The 1861 Open Championship was held at Prestwick Golf Club.

It was the first that allowed amateurs, as well as professionals, to enter. Ten professionals and eight amateurs contested the event, with Old Tom Morris winning the championship by 4 shots from Willie Park Sr. Fairlie's total was 184, giving him an eighth-place finish in the tournament. He won no prize money due to his amateur status.

=== Competitions at St Andrews ===
Playing on the Old Course at St Andrews, Fairlie won the Silver Cross Medal in 1849, 1854 and 1860. He won the Gold Medal (King's Medal) in 1857 and 1862. The two medals have been competed for since 1836 and 1837, respectively.

While at St Andrews, the illustrator and painter Thomas Hodge produced a pen and monochrome watercolour depicting Fairlie on the links in the 1860s. The painting sold on 8 July 1999 at a Christie's auction in London, South Kensington, fetching £8,050.

== Military service ==
In 1829 Fairlie purchased a commissioned in the 2nd Regiment of Life Guards, retiring from the regular army in 1832. He achieved the rank of Lieutenant Colonel-Commandant of the Ayrshire Yeomanry Cavalry in 1860. He sometimes played golf with his friend and veteran Vice Admiral William H. Heriot-Maitland-Dougall.

== Death and legacy ==
Fairlie died on 5 December 1870 and is buried in the churchyard of the parish church in Symington, South Ayrshire. One of his grandchildren was author, Army officer and bobsleigh Olympian Gerard Fairlie.
