= Philip Wynne =

Irish golfer

Personal information
- Full name: Philip P. Wynne, Sr.
- Nationality: Ireland
- Born: c. 1873 County Leitrim, Ireland
- Died: 17 January 1953 Leytonstone, Essex

Career
- Sport: Golf
- Status: Professional
- Professional wins: 3

Best results in major championships
- Masters Tournament: DNP
- PGA Championship: DNP
- U.S. Open: DNP
- The Open Championship: T10: 1898

Philip P. Wynne, Sr. (c. 1873 – 17 January 1953) was an Irish professional golfer who played in the late 19th century and early 20th century. Wynne finished tied for tenth place in the 1898 Open Championship.

== Early life ==
Wynne was born in County Leitrim, Ireland, circa 1873. He was the son of Peter Wynn, a ploughman, whose family home was situated at Sheriffhall three miles south of North Berwick, Scotland. Before the turn of the century, the family moved to Scotland, where they worked as farmhands. Philip, along with his brother Patrick, changed his surname to Wynne in the early 1900s. Wynne earned his professional ticket on the West Links at North Berwick in 1893 and was one of the original members of the PGA.

== Golf career ==
Over the course of his 44-year career, which began with his first job as professional and club maker at Bently Green in Essex (1893–94), he worked at 11 different golf courses with his final posting being at Chingford in east London from 1923–38. He won three professional tournaments: at Crawley in 1901; Troon in 1904; and the Midland Open in 1907, the latter being a qualifying event for the News of The World PGA Match Play tournament which was held at Sunningdale Golf Club, Sunningdale, in October 1907. He came second at the Essex Open in 1920, 1923, and 1925.

=== 1898 Open Championship ===
The 1898 Open Championship was the 38th Open Championship, held 8–9 June at Prestwick Golf Club in Prestwick, South Ayrshire, Scotland. The great English player, Harry Vardon, won the Championship for the second time, a stroke ahead of Willie Park, Jr., the 1887 and 1889 winner.

Wynne finished in a tie for tenth place with James Braid with rounds of 83-79-81-78=321. Neither of the players were awarded any prize money for their efforts as only the top eight finishers were paid.

== Personal life ==
His son, Patrick Philip Wynne, was also a golf professional. He won the Hertfordshire Open Championship in 1936.

Wynne died at Langthorne Hospital in Leytonstone, Essex, in 1953.

== Results in major championships ==
Tournament	1898	1899	1900	1901	1902	1903	1904	1905	1906	1907	1908	1909	1910	1911
The Open Championship	T10	CUT	CUT	DNP	DNP	DNP	CUT	CUT	DNP	T46	DNP	DNP	WD	CUT

Note: Wynne played only in The Open Championship.

DNP = Did not play
CUT = missed the half-way cut
"T" indicates a tie for a place
Yellow background for top-10
