= Kleven =

Kleven may refer to:

- Kleven, a tributary of the Seym, also Ukrainian hydronym for Sudzha (river)
- Jay Kleven, an American baseball player
- Elisa Kleven, an American children's writer
- Endre Johannes Cleven, also spelled Kleven in Norwegian, Norwegian-born Canadian
- Max Kleven (1933–2026), a Norwegian–born American stuntman, director and actor.
- Kleven, a historic and German name for Chiavenna (SO), a town in Lombardy, Italy
- The Norwegian surname, also spelled Cleven
