= James Miller (golfer) =

Scottish golfer

Personal information
- Nationality: Scotland

Career
- Sport: Golf
- Status: Amateur

Best results in major championships
- Masters Tournament: DNP
- PGA Championship: DNP
- U.S. Open: DNP
- The Open Championship: 9th: 1863

James Miller was a Scottish amateur golfer. Miller placed ninth in the 1863 Open Championship.

== Career ==
The 1863 Open Championship was the fourth Open Championship and was again held at Prestwick Golf Club. Eight professionals and six amateurs contested the event in wet and windy weather, with Willie Park, Sr. winning the championship for the second time, by two shots from Tom Morris, Sr.
