= William Steel (golfer) =

Scottish golfer

Personal information
- Nationality: Scotland
- Born: c. 1840 Scotland

Career
- Sport: Golf
- Status: Professional

Best results in major championships
- Masters Tournament: DNP
- PGA Championship: DNP
- U.S. Open: DNP
- The Open Championship: 8th: 1860

William Steel was a Scottish professional golfer. He finished in eighth place in the 1860 Open Championship.

== Early life ==
Steel was born in Scotland circa 1840.

== Golf career ==
=== 1860 Open Championship ===
The 1860 Open Championship was a golf competition held at Prestwick Golf Club, in Ayrshire, Scotland. It is now regarded as the first Open Championship. Eight golfers contested the event, with Willie Park, Sr. winning the championship by 2 shots from Tom Morris, Sr. Steel's round-by-round scores are unknown, although his total for 3 rounds of play was 232, as the event was 3 rounds of 12 holes.

== Death ==
Steel's date of death is unknown.
