= J. F. Johnston =

English golfer

Personal information
- Nationality: England
- Born: c. 1840 England

Career
- Sport: Golf
- Status: Amateur

Best results in major championships
- Masters Tournament: DNP
- PGA Championship: DNP
- U.S. Open: DNP
- The Open Championship: 6th: 1862

J. F. Johnston (c. 1840 – ?) was an English amateur golfer who played in the mid-to-late 19th century. Johnston placed sixth in the 1862 Open Championship.

== Career ==
Johnston was born in England, circa 1840.

The 1862 Open Championship was the third Open Championship and was again held at Prestwick Golf Club, Ayrshire, Scotland. Four professionals and four amateurs contested the event, with Tom Morris, Sr. winning the championship for the second time, by 13 shots from Willie Park, Sr. Johnston carded rounds of 64-69-75=208.

He tied for 10th at the 1863 Open Championship, representing Ayrshire.

Johnston's dates of birth and death are unknown.
