= James Paxton (golfer) =

Scottish golfer (1830–1891)

Personal information
- Full name: James Ferdinand Douglas Paxton
- Nationality: Scotland
- Born: 24 December 1830 Inveresk, Scotland
- Died: 5 August 1891 (aged 60) Eastbourne, Sussex

Career
- Sport: Golf
- Status: Professional

Best results in major championships
- Masters Tournament: DNP
- PGA Championship: DNP
- U.S. Open: DNP
- The Open Championship: 10th: 1863

James Ferdinand Douglas Paxton (24 December 1830 – 5 August 1891) was a Scottish professional golfer who played in the mid-19th century. Paxton placed tenth in the 1863 Open Championship.

== Early life ==
Paxton was born in Scotland in 1830 to James Paxton and Margaret Currie.

== Golf career ==
=== 1863 Open Championship ===
The 1863 Open Championship was the fourth Open Championship and was again held at Prestwick Golf Club. Eight professionals and six amateurs contested the event in wet and windy weather, with Willie Park, Sr. winning the championship for the second time, by two shots from Tom Morris, Sr. Paxton had steady rounds of 65-65-66=196 and finished in tenth place.

== Death ==
Paxton was employed by the golf club in Eastbourne, Sussex. He struggled with alcoholism and died by suicide after overdosing on laudanum.
