= John Stirling Young =

Scottish physician

John Stirling Young FRSE
- Born: 24 September 1894; Symington, Scotland
- Died: 16 September 1971 (aged 76)
- Spouse: Ruth Whipple (m. 1930)
- Children: 3

Academic background
- Education: Kilmarnock Academy
- Alma mater: University of Glasgow

John Stirling Young (1894–1971) was a 20th-century Scottish physician who served as Professor of Pathology at Aberdeen University. He specialised in histology and tumour pathology.

== Life ==
He was born in Symington in Ayrshire on 24 September 1894, the son of Matthew Young and his wife, Mary Stirling. He was educated at Kilmarnock Academy.

His studies at Glasgow University were disrupted by the war. In the First World War he served in the Cameron Highlanders and fought at the Battle of Loos. He then won a commission and transferred to the 1st battalion Black Watch as an Adjutant under Victor Fortune. He won the Military Cross for bravery.

Following the war he gained a general MA BSc in 1920 then began a medical degree qualifying MB ChB in 1923. He then began specialist studies in pathology under Prof Robert Muir. He gained his doctorate (MD) in 1928. In 1932 he was appointed Professor of Pathology at Queen's University, Belfast and in 1937 moved to the same position at Aberdeen University. He played a strong role in relocating the Medical Faculty from Marischal College to Foresterhill in 1938.

In 1944 he was elected a Fellow of the Royal Society of Edinburgh. His proposers were Ernest Cruickshank, Thomas Hugh Milroy, Sir Alister Hardy and James Robert Matthews.

He retired in 1962 after 25 years at Aberdeen University. The following year he was awarded an honorary doctorate (LLD). He died on 16 September 1971.

== Family ==
In 1930 he married Ruth Whipple. They had three sons.
