= 1862 Open Championship =

Tournament information
- Dates: 11 September 1862
- Location: Prestwick, South Ayrshire, Scotland
- Course: Prestwick Golf Club

Statistics
- Field: 8 players

Champion
- (Scotland) Tom Morris, Sr.
- 163

Location in Scotland

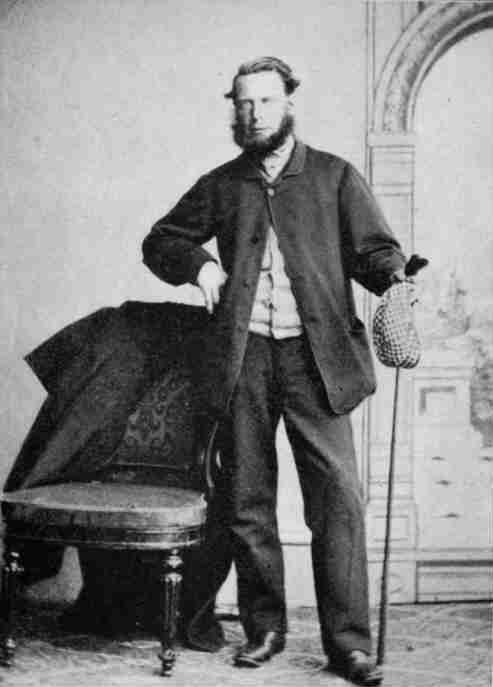
Tom Morris, Sr., winner of the Challenge Belt in 1862 (photographed c. 1860)

The 1862 Open Championship was the third Open Championship and was again held at Prestwick Golf Club, Ayrshire, Scotland. Four professionals and four amateurs contested the event, with Tom Morris, Sr. winning the championship for the second time, by 13 shots from Willie Park, Sr.

As in previous years, the contest was held over three rounds of the 12-hole links course. There was no prize money, the winner receiving the Challenge Belt for the next year.

After the first round Morris led by seven strokes over Park, a lead extended to 11 shots after the second round. Eventually Morris won by 13 strokes, which remains the record margin of victory in the Open Championship. It was also the record margin of victory for any major championship until Tiger Woods won the 2000 U.S. Open at Pebble Beach by 15 shots.

== Final leaderboard ==
Place	Player	Score
1	(Scotland) Tom Morris, Sr.	52-55-56=163
2	(Scotland) Willie Park, Sr.	59-59-58=176
3	(Scotland) Charlie Hunter	60-60-58=178
4	(Scotland) Willie Dow	60-58-63=181
5	(Scotland) James Knight (a)	62-61-63=186
6	(England) J.F. Johnston (a)	64-69-75=208
