= Coodham =

Place in South Ayrshire, Scotland

Coordinates: 55.560871°N 4.550099°W

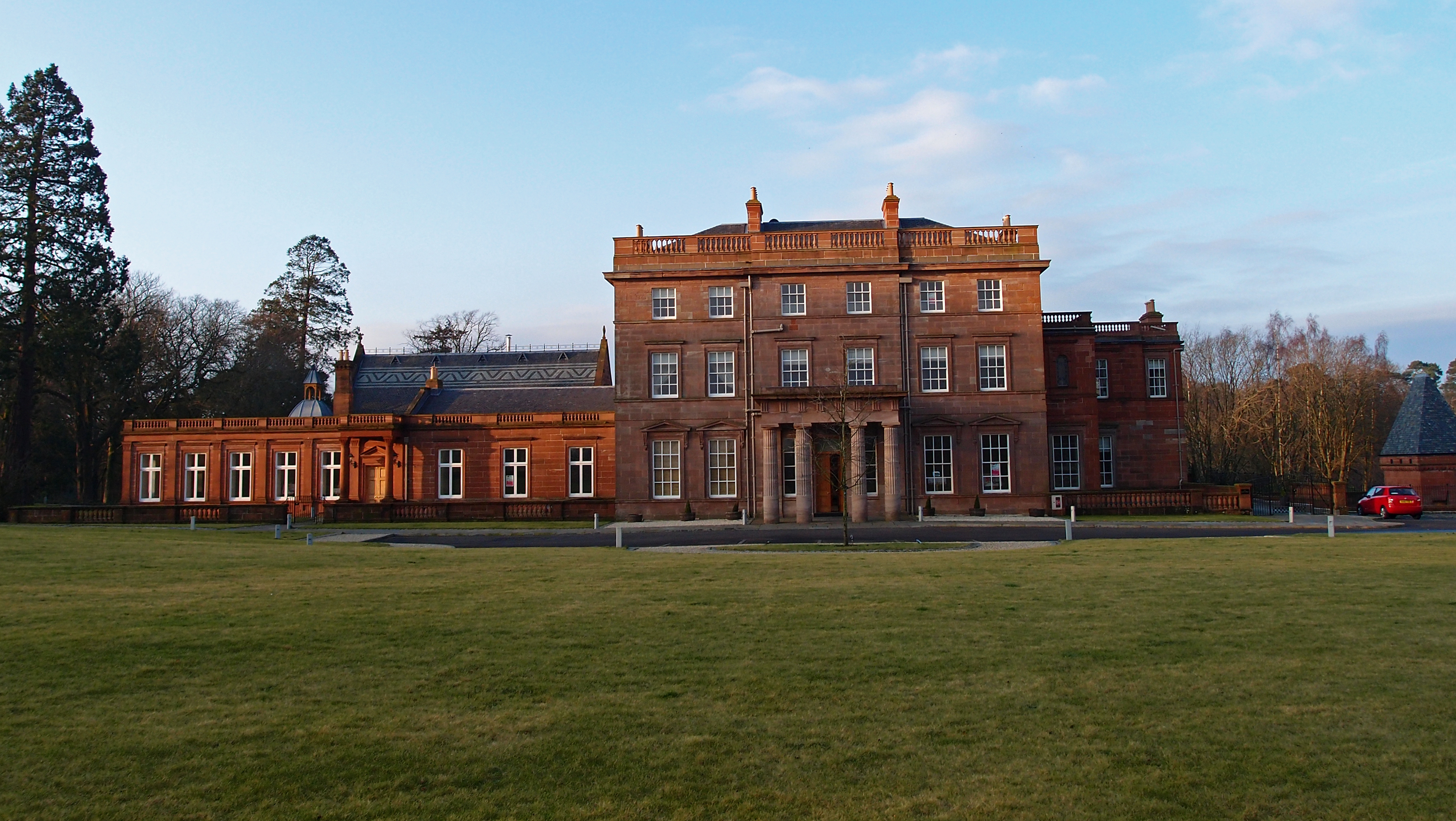
Coodham House, Ayrshire

Coodham, also previously known as Cowdam or Cowdams, is a place near Symington in South Ayrshire, Scotland. The lands were held by the Mure family in the 14th century.

After the death of William Fairlie in 1825, his widow Margaret née Ogilvie began construction on Coodham House, which she named "Williamfield". It became the Fairlie family seat. It later belonged to William Houldsworth.
