= Alexander Smith (golfer) =

Scottish golfer

Personal information
- Nationality: Scotland
- Born: c. 1840 Scotland

Career
- Sport: Golf
- Status: Professional

Best results in major championships
- Masters Tournament: DNP
- PGA Championship: DNP
- U.S. Open: DNP
- The Open Championship: 7th: 1860

Alexander Smith was a Scottish professional golfer. Smith placed seventh in the 1860 Open Championship.

== Early life ==
Smith was born in Scotland circa 1840.

== Golf career ==
=== 1860 Open Championship ===
The 1860 Open Championship was a golf competition held at Prestwick Golf Club, in Ayrshire, Scotland. It is now regarded as the first Open Championship. Eight golfers contested the event, with Willie Park, Sr. winning the championship by 2 shots from Tom Morris, Sr. Smith finished in seventh place, scoring 196 in three rounds of play.

== Death ==
Smith's date of death is unknown.
