= George Daniel Brown =

English professional golfer

Personal information
- Full name: George Daniel Brown
- Nationality: England
- Born: 1836 London, England
- Died: 1902 (aged 65–66) London, England

Career
- Sport: Golf
- Status: Professional

Best results in major championships
- Masters Tournament: DNP
- PGA Championship: DNP
- U.S. Open: DNP
- The Open Championship: 5th: 1860, 1863

George Daniel Brown (1836–1902) was an English professional golfer. He also specialized as a ball and club maker. Brown finished fifth in the 1860 Open Championship and repeated the feat in the 1863 Open Championship. In total, Brown had three top-10 finishes in The Open Championship.

== Early life ==
Brown was born in London, England, in 1836.

== Golf career ==
=== 1860 Open Championship ===
The 1860 Open Championship was a golf competition held at Prestwick Golf Club, in Ayrshire, Scotland. It is now regarded as the first Open Championship. Eight golfers contested the event, with Willie Park, Sr. winning the championship by 2 shots from Tom Morris, Sr. also known as "Old Tom Morris". Brown scored 192 in three rounds of play.

=== 1863 Open Championship ===
The 1863 Open Championship was the fourth Open Championship and was again held at Prestwick Golf Club. Eight professionals and six amateurs contested the event in wet and windy weather, with Willie Park, Sr. winning the championship for the second time, by two shots from Tom Morris, Sr. Brown carded rounds of 58-61-57=176 but did not win any prize money; only the top 4 finishers received a cash prize.

==== Details of play ====
As in previous years, the contest was held over three rounds of the 12-hole links course. For the first time there was prize money for those finishing 2nd, 3rd and 4th, although the winner only received the Challenge Belt for the next year.

Davie Park, younger brother of Willie, led after the first round with a score of 55. An excellent second round 54 meant that Willie led by four strokes. Eventually Willie won by two strokes from Morris, spoiling Morris's attempt at a third consecutive win, which would have given him outright possession of the Challenge Belt which had been donated by Archibald Montgomerie, the Earl of Eglinton, although Morris took the second prize of £5.

== Death and legacy ==
Brown died in 1902 in London, England. He is best known for having three top-10 finishes in the Open Championship.

== Results in major championships ==
Tournament	1860	1861	1862	1863
The Open Championship	5	9		5

Note: Brown only played in The Open Championship.

Top 10
Did not play
