= Charlie Hunter (golfer) =

Scottish professional golfer

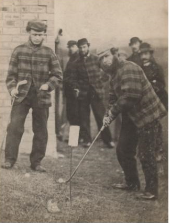
- Hunter (left) watches as Old Tom Morris plays a shot in 1863 at Prestwick. Both of the players are wearing the traditional tweeds.

Personal information
- Full name: Charles Crawford Hunter
- Nationality: Scotland
- Born: 5 June 1836 Prestwick, Scotland
- Died: 24 January 1921 (aged 84) Prestwick, Scotland

Career
- Sport: Golf
- Status: Professional

Best results in major championships
- Masters Tournament: DNP
- PGA Championship: DNP
- U.S. Open: DNP
- The Open Championship: 3rd: 1862

Charles Crawford Hunter (5 June 1836 – 24 January 1921) was a Scottish professional golfer and greenskeeper. He was born at Prestwick, Scotland, and died there. He was the last survivor of those who took part in the first Open Championship in 1860. Over the course of his career, Hunter had seven top-10 finishes in the Open Championship.

== Early life and family ==
Hunter was born on 5 June 1836 in Prestwick, Scotland. Hunter's son, John, finished in eighth place in the 1898 Open Championship and also won the 1907 Scottish PGA Championship.

== Golf career ==
Hunter had seven top-10 finishes in the Open Championship. His best performance, rounds of 60-60-58=178, put him in third place in the 1862 Open Championship.

=== 1862 Open Championship ===
The 1862 Open Championship was the third Open Championship and was held at Prestwick Golf Club, Ayrshire, Scotland, the site of the first 12 Open Championship tournaments, the first of which was in 1860. Hunter played steady golf, carding rounds of 60-60-58=178, and finished in third place. Tom Morris, Sr. won the Championship, shooting rounds of 52-55-56=163, and triumphed by the large margin of 13 strokes from runner-up Willie Park, Sr.

== Employed by Prestwick Golf Club ==
Hunter was employed by Prestwick Golf Club as 'Keeper of the Green', and assisted as well with the early formation work for the neighbouring Royal Troon Golf Club, located just north of Prestwick, in the 1870s and 1880s.

== Death and legacy ==
Hunter died of bronchitis in 1921 at the age of 84. He was the last survivor of those who took part in the first Open Championship in 1860.

== Results in The Open Championship ==
Tournament	1860	1861	1862	1863	1864	1865	1866	1867	1868	1869	1870	1871	1872	1873	1874
The Open Championship	6	12	3	7					T8	9	T9	NT	6		28

Note: Hunter played only in The Open Championship.

Top 10
Did not play

NT = no tournament
"T" indicates a tie for a place
