= James Knight (golfer) =

Scottish golfer

Personal information
- Nationality: Scotland
- Born: c. 1840

Career
- Sport: Golf
- Status: Amateur

Best results in major championships
- Masters Tournament: DNP
- PGA Championship: DNP
- U.S. Open: DNP
- The Open Championship: 5th: 1862

James Knight, Jr. (born c. 1840) was a Scottish amateur golfer. Knight placed fifth in the 1862 Open Championship.

== Career ==
Knight was born circa 1840 in Scotland.

The 1862 Open Championship was the third Open Championship and was again held at Prestwick Golf Club, Ayrshire, Scotland. Four professionals and four amateurs contested the event, with Tom Morris, Sr. winning the championship for the second time, by 13 shots from Willie Park, Sr.
