= 1898 Open Championship =

Coordinates: 55.502°N 4.619°W

Tournament information
- Dates: 8–9 June 1898
- Location: Prestwick, South Ayrshire, Scotland
- Course: Prestwick Golf Club

Statistics
- Field: 76 players, 43 after cut
- Cut: 170
- Prize fund: £90
- Winner's share: £30

Champion
- (Jersey) Harry Vardon
- 307

Location in Scotland

The 1898 Open Championship was the 38th Open Championship, held 8–9 June at Prestwick Golf Club in Prestwick, South Ayrshire, Scotland. Harry Vardon won the Championship for the second time, a stroke ahead of Willie Park Jr., the 1887 and 1889 winner.

With the increasing number of "hopeless competitors" and "second-class golfers" entering the Open, a cut was introduced for the first time to reduce the number of players on the final day. All entries played 36 holes on the first day with all those within 19 strokes of the leader making the cut and playing 36 holes on the final day, with the additional provision that the final day's field had to contain at least 32 professionals. There was a change to the prize money distribution. The total remained unchanged at £90 but was only given to the first 6 and not the first 12.

Defending champion Harold Hilton and Willie Park Jr. led after the first round on 76. Park was even better in the afternoon and led after the first day on 151. Vardon also scored 75 and was second on 154 with Thomas Renouf and J.H. Taylor on 156. Hilton led the amateurs on 157. 43 players made the cut, including five amateurs. Willie Auchterlonie, who had won the previous Open Championship at Prestwick in 1893, was amongst those who failed to make the cut.

Vardon scored a useful 77 in the third round despite a seven at the 15th. Park scored 78 to maintain the lead. Freddie Tait had the best round of 75 and shared third place with Taylor four shots behind Park. In the final round Vardon reached the turn in 38 and finished with a 76 after an excellent three at the last. Park reached the turn in 39 after sixes at the 1st and 3rd holes. Taking six at the 10th dropped him behind and he reached the last needing a three to tie Vardon. On the edge of the green after his tee shot, he putted to four feet but missed to finish one behind. Hilton reached the turn in 35 to be level with Vardon but came back in 40 and finished two strokes behind. Tait took eight at the 3rd to drop out of contention.

== First day leaderboard ==
Wednesday, 8 June 1898

Place	Player	Score
1	(Scotland) Willie Park Jr.	76-75=151
2	(Jersey) Harry Vardon	79-75=154
T3	(Jersey) Thomas Renouf	77-79=156
T3	(England) J.H. Taylor	78-78=156
T5	(England) Harold Hilton (a)	76-81=157
T5	(Scotland) David Kinnell	80-77=157
T7	(Scotland) James Kinnell	77-81=158
T7	(Scotland) Freddie Tait (a)	81-77=158
9	(Scotland) Sandy Herd	80-79=159
10	(Scotland) David Herd	79-81=160

== Final leaderboard ==
Thursday, 9 June 1898

Place	Player	Score	Money
1	(Jersey) Harry Vardon	79-75-77-76=307	£30
2	(Scotland) Willie Park Jr.	76-75-78-79=308	£20
3	(England) Harold Hilton (a)	76-81-77-75=309	−
4	(England) J.H. Taylor	78-78-77-79=312	£15
5	(Scotland) Freddie Tait (a)	81-77-75-82=315	−
6	(Scotland) David Kinnell	80-77-79-80=316	£10
7	(Scotland) Willie Fernie	79-85-77-77=318	£7 10s
8	(Scotland) John Hunter	82-79-81-77=319	£7 10s
9	(Jersey) Thomas Renouf	77-79-81-83=320	0
T10	(Scotland) James Braid	80-82-84-75=321	0
T10	(Ireland) Philip Wynne	83-79-81-78=321	0
