= William Fairlie (merchant) =

Scottish merchant that lived in India (1754-1825)

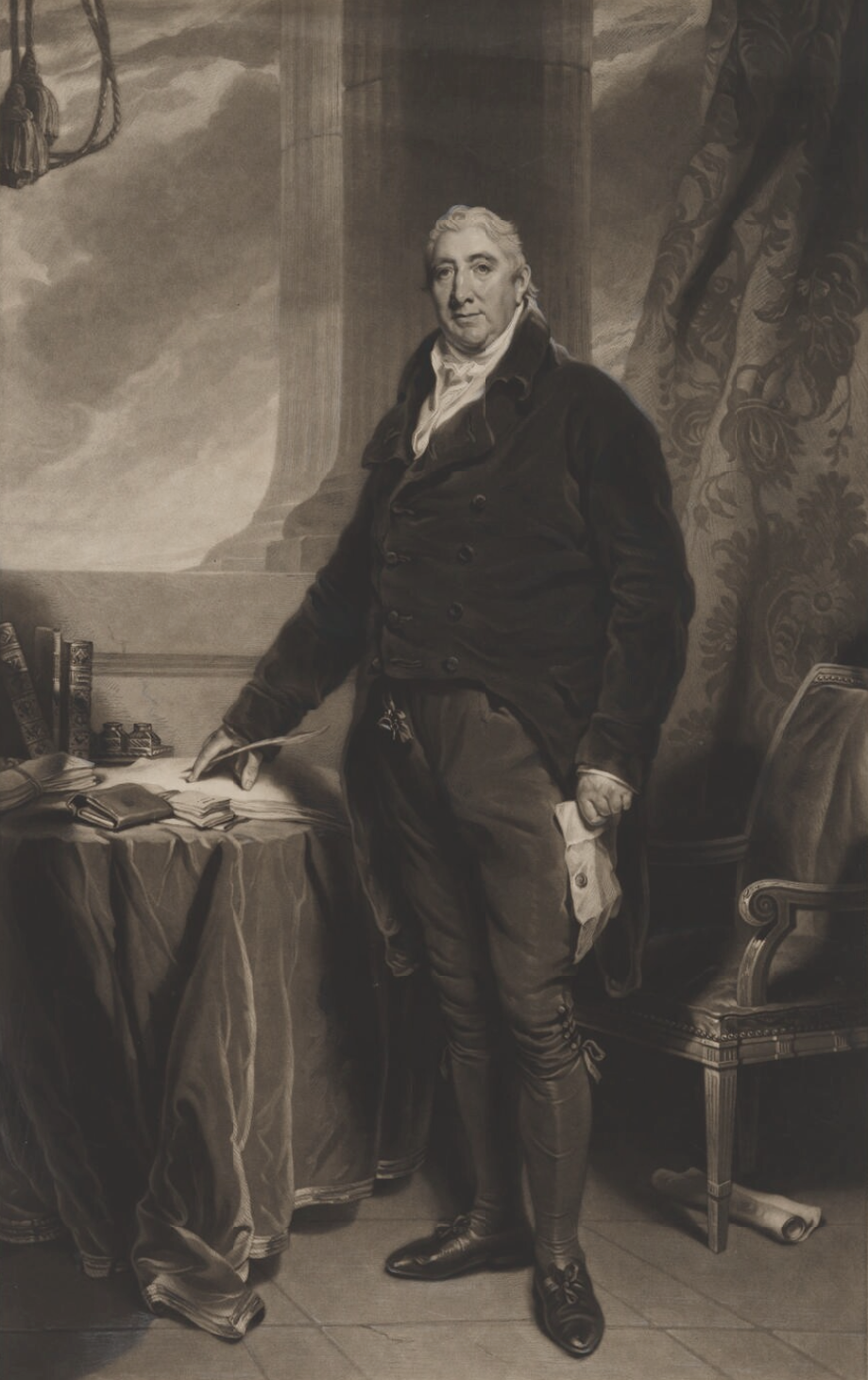
- William Fairlie, 1817 engraving
- Born: 1754; Scotland
- Died: 1825 (aged 70–71)
- Occupation: Merchant
- Known for: Prominent merchant in British India
- Spouse: Margaret Ogilvy
- Children: 5 including James Ogilvie Fairlie

William Fairlie (1754–1825) was a Scottish merchant in Bengal during the East India Company rule in India.

== Life ==
He was the third son of John Fairlie and his wife Agnes Mure or Muir.

He went to India in the early 1780s, remaining there until 1812, and was associated with the "Fairlie House" in Calcutta, an agency that traded under a succession of names. He initially went into partnership with John Fergusson in 1782. They operated as free merchants, not beholden to the British East India Company.

The house was also on good terms with David Scott & Co. of London, run by David Scott, and Fairlie became a partner in it.

== Enterprises ==
In a legal case of the 1840s, it was argued that Fairlie had participated in four successive firms based in Calcutta:

- Fergusson & Fairlie. Fergusson returned to Great Britain in 1789, took over David Scott's business in London, and died in 1793.
- Fairlie, Reid & Co.
- Fairlie, Gilmore & Co.
- Fairlie, Fergusson & Co.

The last of these was succeeded in 1818 by Fergusson, Clark & Co.

From 1793 Fairlie, with Scott and his son, ran for about 20 years a business empire operating in London, New York, India, China and South-East Asia. Fairlie, Bonham & Co., involving Fairlie, H. Bonham and John Innes, was a London house, a successor to Scott, Bonham, Hartwell, Innes & Co.

== Family ==
Fairlie married Margaret Ogilvy, daughter of John Ogilvy of Murtle. Their children included:

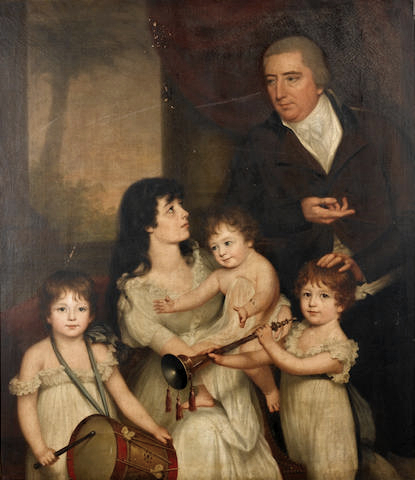
William Fairlie and young family, group portrait c.1801

- William Fairlie (1798–1822)
- John Fairlie (born 1799)
- James Ogilvie Fairlie
- Agnes Maria, eldest daughter, married James Fairlie of Holms, her cousin.
- Margaret Eliza, married John Stuart Hay.

=== Coodham House ===
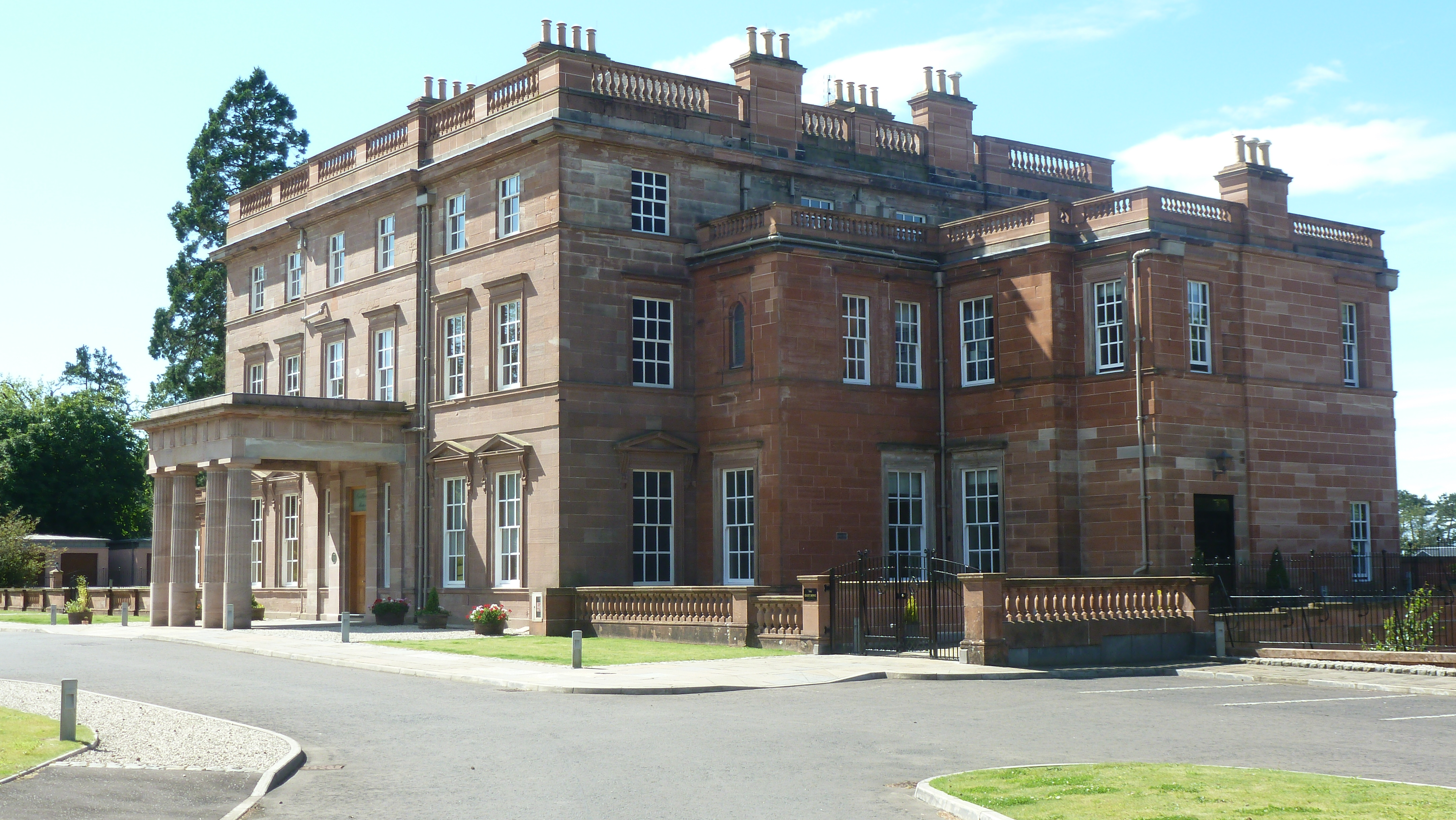
Coodham House, Ayrshire

After Fairlie's death, his widow Margaret began construction on Coodham House, near Symington, South Ayrshire, which she named "Williamfield".

The house became the family seat.

Coodham House would later belong to William Houldsworth.
