= 1860 Open Championship =

Tournament information
- Dates: 17 October 1860
- Location: Prestwick, South Ayrshire, Scotland
- Course: Prestwick Golf Club

Statistics
- Field: 8 players

Champion
- (Scotland) Willie Park, Sr.
- 174

Location in Scotland

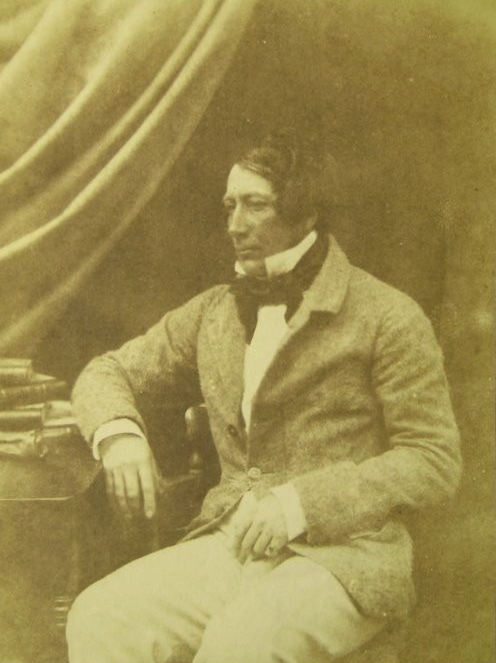
James Ogilvie Fairlie, principal organizer of the inaugural 1860 Open Championship, c. 1847

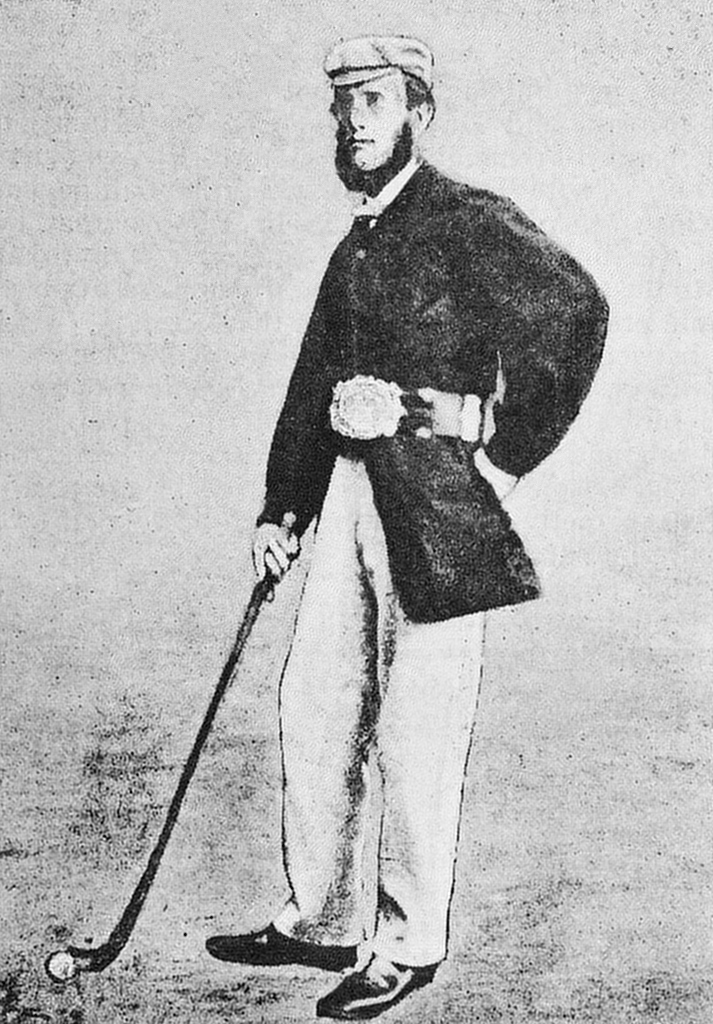
Willie Park, Sr. wearing the Challenge Belt

The 1860 Open Championship was a golf competition held at Prestwick Golf Club, in Ayrshire, Scotland. It is now regarded as the first Open Championship, although the competition would not be open to amateurs until the following year. Until his death in 1859, Allan Robertson was regarded as top golfer in the world. The Open Championship was created to determine his successor. Eight golfers contested the event, with Willie Park, Sr. winning the championship by 2 shots from Tom Morris, Sr.

Prestwick Golf Club organised the event, "to be played for by professional golfers". Golf clubs in Scotland and England were invited to name and send up to three of their best players to compete. The contest was over three rounds of the twelve-hole links course. The prize for winning was the Challenge Belt; a player winning the belt three successive years would keep it. "Cawdies, i.e. Professional Players, not Keepers of Links" were eligible and had to produce a certificate of respectability from their club. George Daniel Brown was the only Englishman to play in the event.

James Ogilvie Fairlie was the principal organizer of this inaugural Open Championship. In a proposed competition for a "Challenge Belt", Fairlie sent out a series of letters to Aberdeen, Blackheath, Bruntsfield, Carnoustie Panmure, Dirleton Castle, Innerleven, Montrose, North Berwick, Perth, Musselburgh and St. Andrews (as noted in Prestwick Golf Club Archive), inviting a player known as a "respectable caddie" to represent each of the clubs in a tournament to be held on 17 October 1860.

The pairings were Tom Morris, Sr. (Prestwick) and Robert Andrew (Perth), Willie Park Sr. (Musselburgh) and Alexander Smith (Bruntsfield), William Steel (Bruntsfield) and Charlie Hunter (Prestwick St Nicholas), George Daniel Brown (Blackheath) and Andrew Strath (St Andrews).

== Course ==
Hole	Name	Yards
1	Back of Cardinal	578
2	Alps	385
3	Tunnel (Red)	167
4	Wall	448
5	Sea Hedrig	440
6	Tunnel (White)	314
7	Green Hollow	144
8	Station	166
9	Burn	395
10	Lunch House	213
11	Short	132
12	Home	417
	Yardage	3,799

== Final leaderboard ==
Place	Player	Score
1	(Scotland) Willie Park, Sr.	55-59-60=174
2	(Scotland) Tom Morris, Sr.	58-59-59=176
3	(Scotland) Andrew Strath	180
4	(Scotland) Robert Andrew	191
5	(England) George Daniel Brown	192
6	(Scotland) Charlie Hunter	195
7	(Scotland) Alexander Smith	196
8	(Scotland) William Steel	232

== See also ==
- Golf in Scotland
