= Clevens Loch, Ayrshire =

Clevens Loch
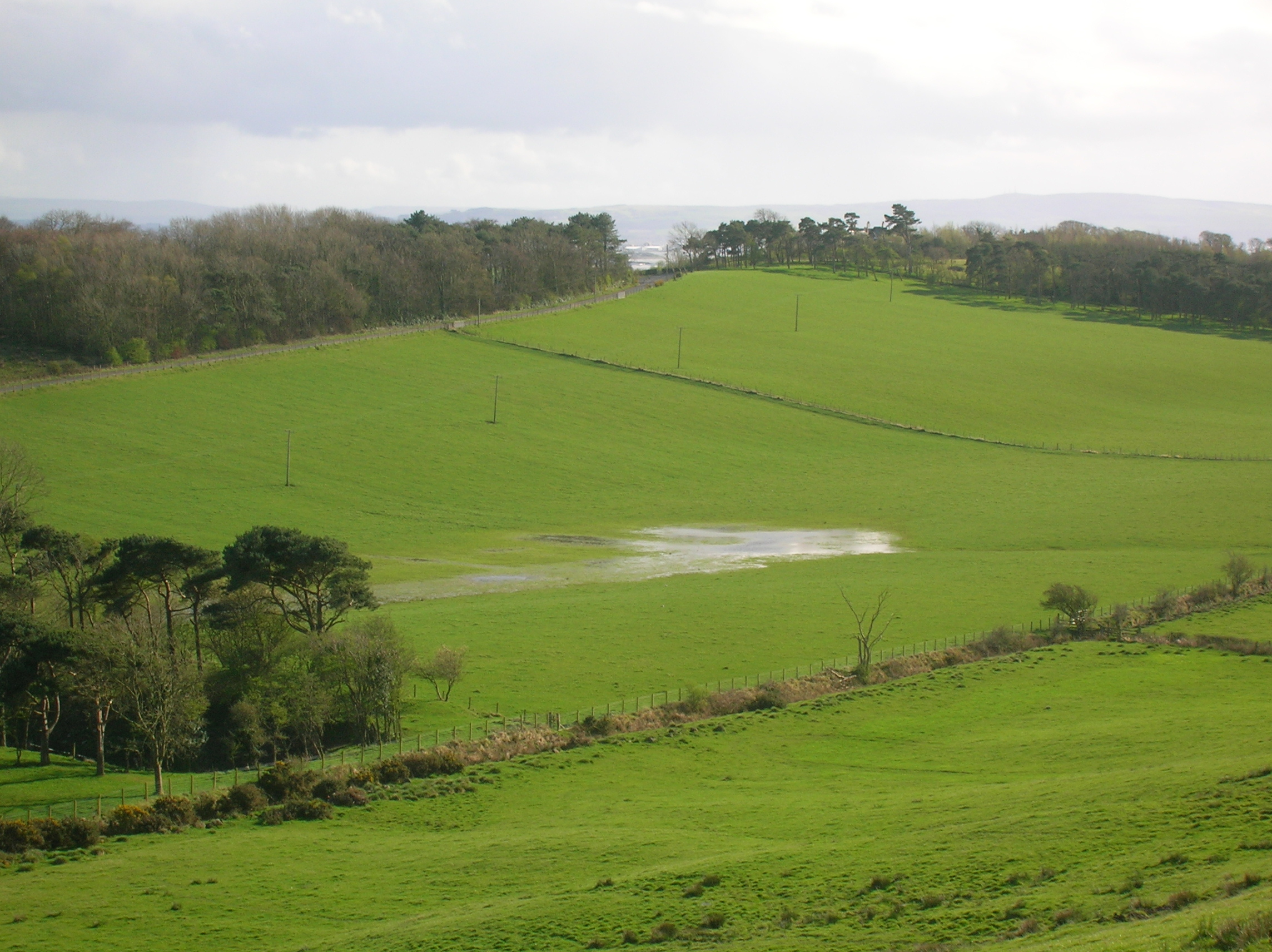
- The site of Clevens Loch

- Location of Clevens Loch, North Ayrshire
- Location: Dundonald, South Ayrshire, Scotland
- Coordinates: 55°33′14.9″N 4°35′37.2″W
- Type: Old freshwater loch
- Primary inflows: Rumbling Burn
- Primary outflows: Cross Burn
- Basin countries: Scotland
- Average depth: Shallow
- Islands: None

Clevens Loch was a substantial freshwater loch situated in a low-lying area below Clevance Farm and Langholm Farm in Dundonald parish, South Ayrshire, Scotland.

== History ==
The loch was a natural feature, a post-glacial 'Kettle Hole' once of a substantial extent, fed mainly by the Rumbling Burn, rainfall, field drainage, and natural springs. It is recorded in the placename of Langholm and Clevance. The etymology of the name may derive from the Scots for 'spear-shaped hill' referring to the shape of the glen and hills surrounding it. The Rumbling Burn has been diverted away from the site. The loch site still floods in winter. An outflow runs down to the Cross Burn. Langholm Farm's name translates from Scots as a long stretch of low-lying land beside water; it is not recorded on maps until after the loch was drained.

The lands, variously known as 'Kleffans' in 1654, 'Clevens' in 1747, 'Clivens' in 1828, 'Cleavance' in 1865 and 'Clevance' in 1890.

=== Drainage ===
The loch's drainage may have begun in the early 18th century when Alexander Montgomerie, 10th Earl of Eglinton, was pursuing a number of agricultural improvements on his extensive estates and other landowners followed his example. Further drainage work may have taken place in the 1740s as part of the improvements undertaken to provide employment for Irish estate workers during the Irish potato famines of the 1740s and the mid 19th centuries. Many drainage schemes also date to the end of World War I when many soldiers returned en masse to civilian life.

=== Usage ===
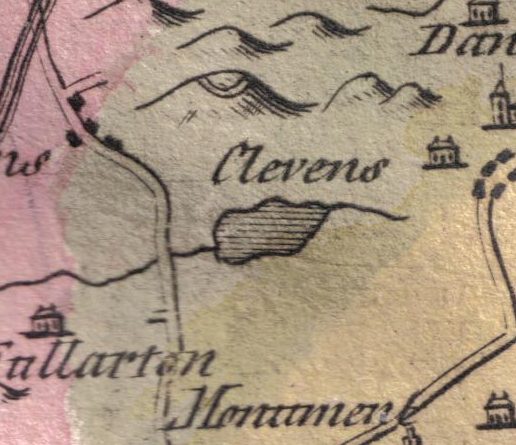
Clevens Loch in 1811.

No watermills seem to have been directly associated with Clevens Loch and the Ordnance Survey maps of the mid 19th century only show the farm of Clevens or Clevance sitting above the old loch's site. Thomson's map of 1832 shows a Scullochmill near the Crossburn at the Clevance Farm roadend, however a straight lade runs directly to it from the hills above.

=== Cartographic evidence ===
Blaeu's map of 1654, dating from Timothy Pont's survey of circa 1604, shows the loch as a significant body of water, with an outflow only.

Ainslie's map of 1821 is the last map to show Clevens Loch and this indicates that its drainage took place in the early 19th century. The outflow was via the Fullarton estate and into the sea at Newburn. Roy's map of 1747 shows a Cleavans Loch.

Views of the Clevens Loch site

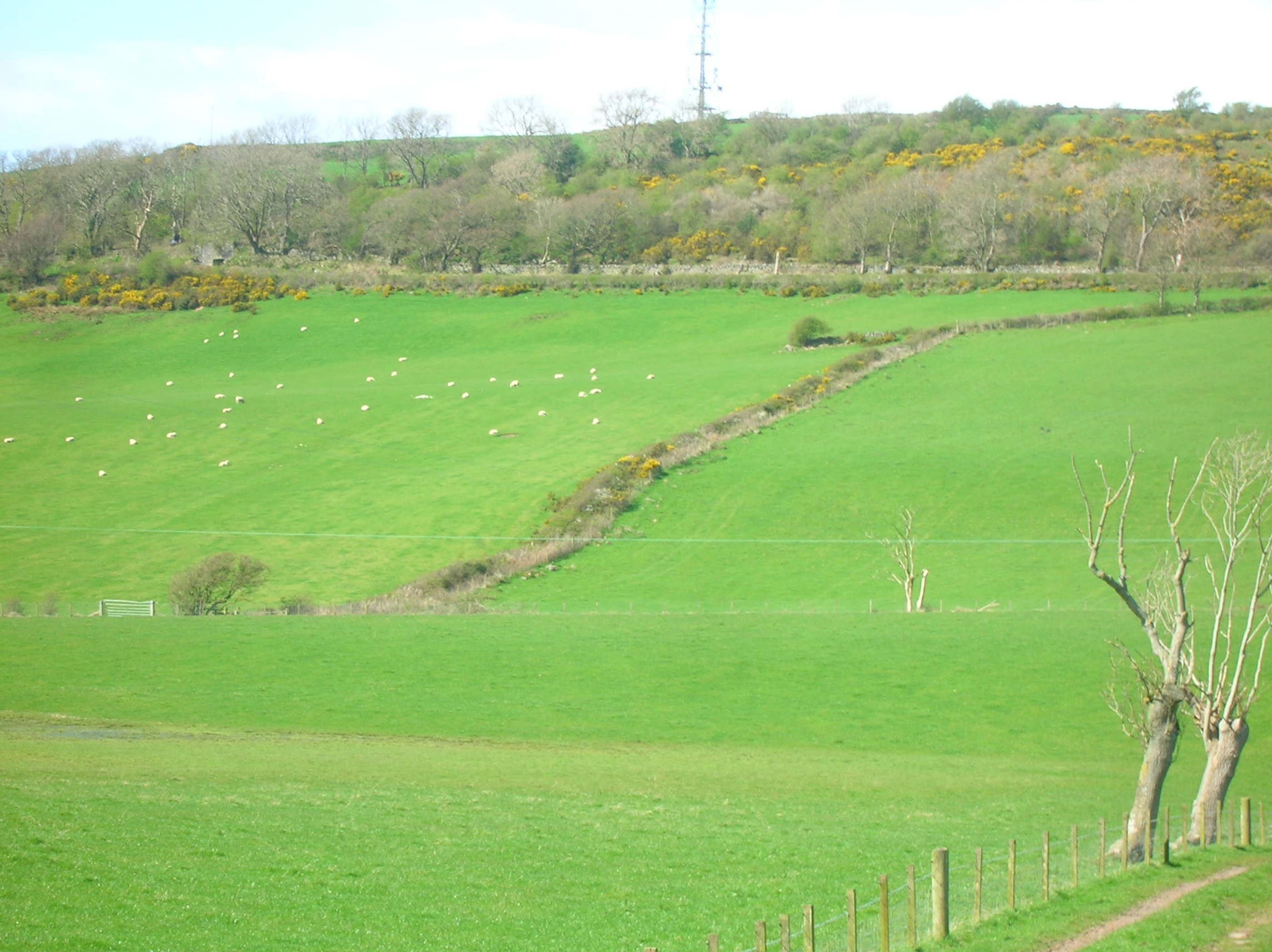
A spring fed burn running down to the loch site.

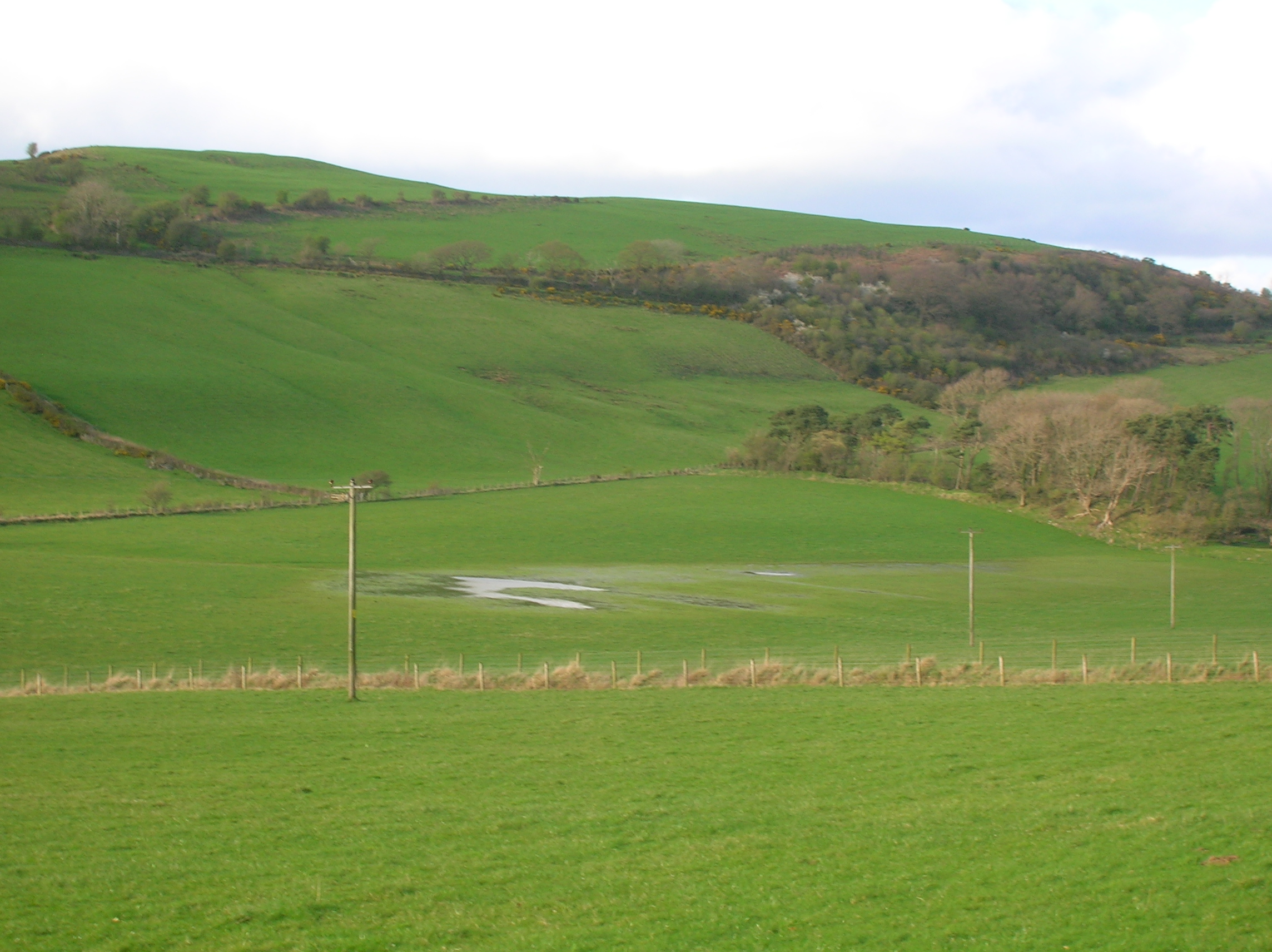
The loch site from Corraith.

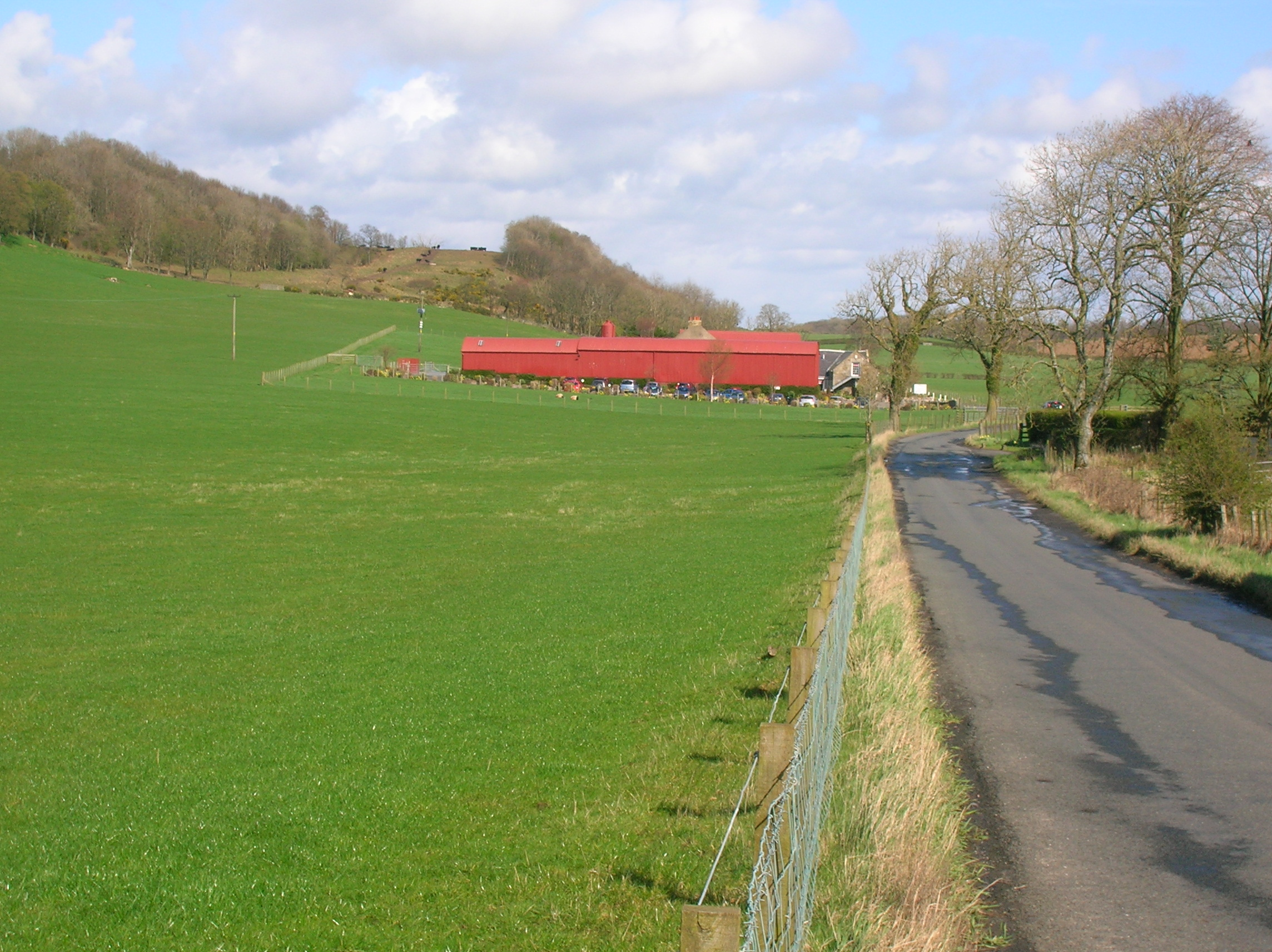
The site of Clevens Loch looking towards Langholm Farm.

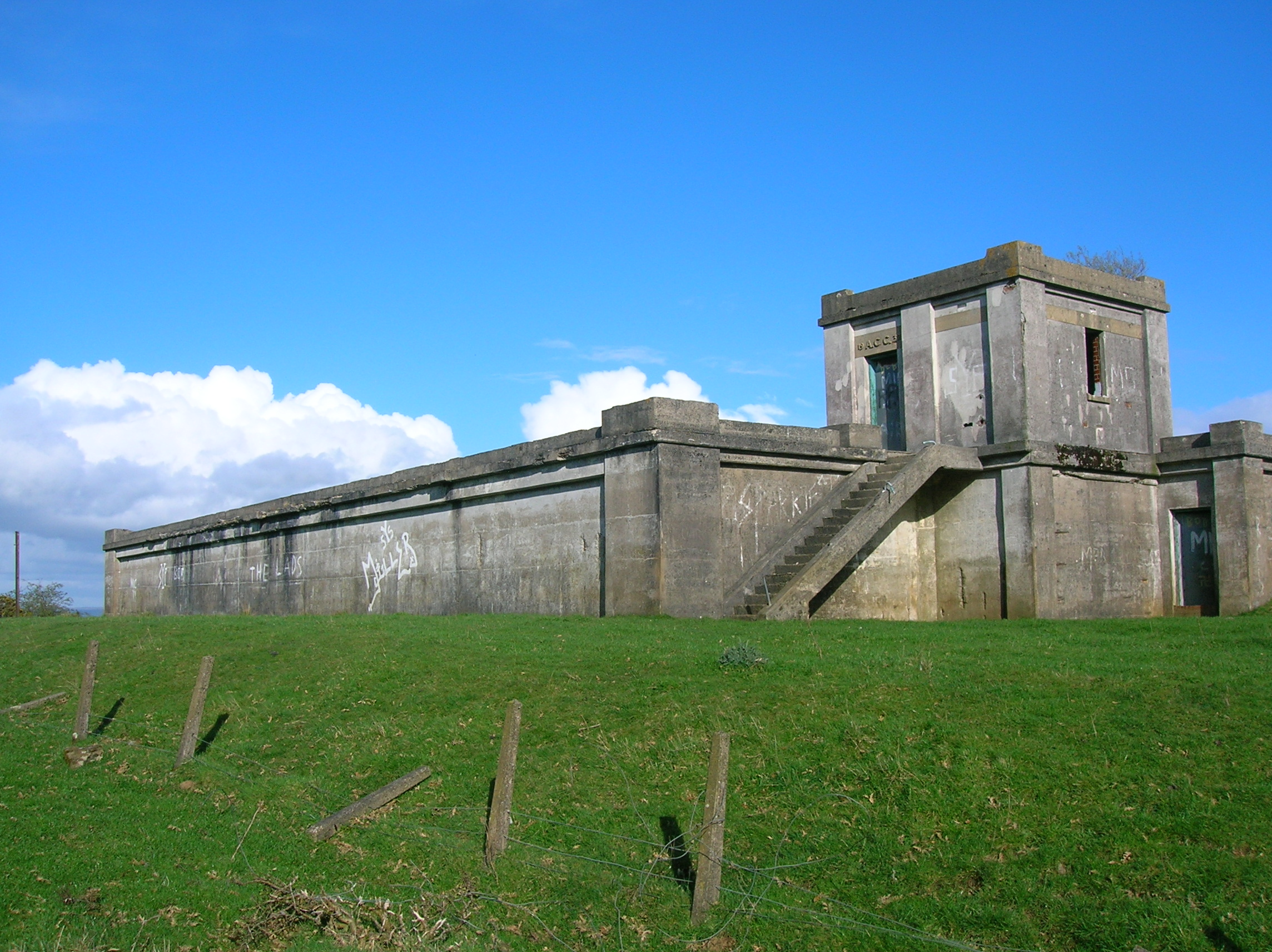
The old water tank above Langholm Farm.

== Micro-history ==
Corraith House stands in an elevated position to the south of the old loch's shore, recorded as 'Korreth' in 1654 and Corries in 1747. Above the loch on Wardlaw Hill are the remains of a 'citadel' fort or minor oppida, occupying the total summit plateau area., at about 145m OD, comprises an inner fort or settlement on the highest point of the plateau; it has a collapsed stone-built rampart and an entrance may have been positioned on the northern side. A ruined wall of a later date runs along the top of the rampart around the western half of the old fort. The older OS maps indicate that a flow of spring water once ran down to the Slough Burn from the site of what became the Ayrshire County Council water tank built in 1932.

Adamson in his 'Rambles Round Kilmarnock' of 1875 records that on making his way from Symington along the lane that ran near to the old loch he drank from an open well neatly built in, and bears the date 1821.
