= Timeline of golf history (1851–1945) =

The following is a partial timeline of the history of golf.

== 1851–1860 ==
1851

The Prestwick Golf Club is founded.

1856

Pau Golf Club is founded, the first in continental Europe.

A rule change is enacted that, in match play, the ball must be played as it lies or the hole be conceded. It is the last recorded toughening of the rules structure.

1857

The Golfer's Manual, by "A Keen Hand" (H. B. Farnie), is published. It is the first book on golf instruction.

The Prestwick Club institutes the first Championship Meeting, a foursomes competition at St Andrews attended by eleven golf clubs. George Glennie and J.C. Stewart win for Blackheath.

1858

The Royal Curragh Golf Club is founded at Kildare, the oldest golf club in Ireland.

The format of the Championship Meeting is changed to individual match play and is won by Robert Chambers of Bruntsfield.

Allan Robertson becomes the first golfer to break 80 at the Old Course, recording a 79.

The King James VI Golf Club is founded in Perth, Scotland.

1859

The first Amateur Championship is won by George Condie of Perth.

Death of Allan Robertson, the first great professional golfer.

== 1860–1870 ==
1860

The Prestwick Club institutes a Professional Championship played at Prestwick; the first Championship Belt is won by Willie Park, Snr.

1861

The Professionals Championship is opened to amateurs, and The Open Championship is born. The first competition is won by Old Tom Morris.

1864

The North Devon Golf Club is founded at Westward Ho!

1865

The London Scottish Golf Club is founded on Wimbledon Common.

1867

The Ladies' Golf Club at St. Andrews is founded, the first golf club for women.

1868

Young Tom Morris, age 17, wins the first of four successive Open Championships. His streak would include an 11-stroke victory in 1869 and a 12-stroke victory in 1870 (in a 36-hole format). His 149 in the 1870 Open over 36 holes is a stroke average that would not be equalled until the invention of the rubber-cored ball.

1869

The Liverpool Golf Club is founded at Hoylake, later Royal Liverpool.

== 1870–1880 ==
1870

Young Tom Morris wins his third consecutive Open Championship, thus winning permanent possession of the Belt.

The Royal Adelaide Golf Club is founded, the first golf club in Australia.

1871

The Forfar Golf Club is formed, Tom Morris Snr lays out the course.

The Otago Golf Club is formed, the first club in New Zealand.

1872

The Open Championship is reinstituted when Prestwick, St. Andrews and the Honourable Company of Edinburgh Golfers offer a new trophy, with the Open Championship to be hosted in rotation by the three clubs.

Young Tom Morris wins his fourth consecutive Open Championship.

1873

The Christchurch Golf Club is formed, the second club in New Zealand.

The Royal Montreal Golf Club is formed, the oldest surviving golf club in Canada and North America.

The Open Championship is held for the first time at the Old Course.

1874

The Royal Quebec Golf Club is formed in Quebec City, and remains the second oldest surviving golf club in Canada and North America.

1875

The Oxford and Cambridge University Golf Clubs are founded.

Young Tom Morris dies at age 24. He did not emotionally recover from the death of both his wife and their daughter in childbirth earlier that year.

1876

The Toronto Golf Club is established, the third oldest golf club in Canada and North America.

Originally located on the Fernhill property in Toronto, the Club moved to its current location on the banks of the Etobicoke River in 1911.

1877

Jamie Anderson wins the first of three consecutive Open Championships.

1878

The first University Match is played on the London Scottish Golf Club course at Wimbledon, won by Oxford.

== 1880–1890 ==
1881

Royal Belfast is founded.

The use of moulds is instituted to dimple the gutta-percha ball. Golfers had long noticed that the guttie worked in the air much better after it had been hit several times and scuffed up.

1882

Great Yarmouth Golf Club is founded by Dr. Thomas Browne R.N, who moved to the area to work at the Royal Naval Hospital

1883

Bob Ferguson of Musselburgh, losing The Open in extra holes, comes one victory shy of equalling Young Tom Morris' record of four consecutive titles. Ferguson ends up later in life penniless, working out of the Musselburgh caddy-shack.

1884

The Edgewood Club of Tivoli is founded in Tivoli, New York with two golf holes. The course was incrementally expanded to nine holes by 1916. This club is the oldest existing U.S. golf club with continuous golf in the same location.

1885

The Amateur Championship is first played at Royal Liverpool Golf Club, Hoylake.

The London Metal Exchange Golf Association (LMEGA) is formed.

The Royal Cape Golf Club is founded at Wynberg, South Africa, the first club in Africa.

1886

John Hamilton Gillespie lays out a two-hole golf course in Sarasota, Florida.

A.J. Balfour is appointed Chief Secretary (Cabinet Minister) for Ireland; his rise to political and social prominence has an incalculable effect on the popularity of golf, as he is an indefatigable player and catalyzes great interest in the game through his writing and public speaking. Alexander H. Findlay, later to become the Father of American Golf, was the first in the world to score a 72 in competition for 18 holes at the Mercantile Golf Club in Montrose, Scotland.

1887

The Art of Golf by Sir Walter Simpson is published.

The Quogue Field Club was founded in Quogue, New York. The original course had 18 holes, but after the Hurricane of 1938 the club lost 3 holes to the bay and had to reduce the course to 9 holes from that point forward.

1887

The Foxburg Country Club is founded in Foxburg, Pennsylvania.

1887

Essex County Country Club in West Orange, NJ was incorporated in May 1887, a Constitution was adopted in January 1888 which established the Club

1888

Kebo Valley Golf Club opens in Maine

The Town & Country Club is founded in St. Paul, Minnesota.

The Saint Andrew's Golf Club, consisting of a three-hole course, is founded in Yonkers, New York.

The Karachi Golf Club is founded (Karachi, Sindh, India)

The Royal Malta Golf Club is founded (became Royal in 1903)

== 1890–1900 ==
1890

John Ball, an English amateur, becomes the first non-Scotsman and first amateur to win The Open Championship.

The concept of playing a match under handicap against the number of shots a hypothetical golfer playing perfect golf at every hole was conceived by Hugh Rotherham, a member at Coventry Golf Club. Rotherham called this a "Ground Score." This idea was suggested to Dr. Thomas Browne, honorary secretary of the Great Yarmouth Club, and it was introduced on a match play basis at the club. During one such competition, one golfer was playing incredibly well and was hailed a Bogey Man to Dr Browne. The phrase 'a bogey' was invented and the ground score became known as a 'bogey. henceforth.' At the time, "Hush, here comes the Bogey man" was a popular music hall song of the day. With the invention of the rubber-cored ball, golfers are able to reach the greens in fewer strokes, and so bogey has come to represent one over the par score for the hole.

Berkhamsted Golf Club (Founded 1890)

1891

The Golfing Union of Ireland is founded on 12 October 1891 and is the oldest Golfing Union in the world.

Shinnecock Hills Golf Club is founded on Long Island.

The Royal Golf Club of Las Palmas in Gran Canaria is founded; it is the oldest Club in Spain.

The Cannes Golf Club is founded in Cannes by Grand Duke Michael of Russia. The first golf club in the French Rivera. It is here that Michael taught Prince Albert to play golf.

1892

The Oakhurst Golf Club is founded at White Sulphur Springs, West Virginia. It hosted the Oakhurst Challenge, the oldest known golf tournament in the U.S. The Oakhurst Challenge Medal is recognized as the oldest known prize for golf in the U.S. The first hole at The Homestead survives from this course and is the oldest surviving golf hole in America.

Glen Arven Country Club golf course established in Thomasville, Georgia USA; the oldest course still in use in Georgia.

Gate money is charged for the first time, at a match between Douglas Rollard and Jack White at Cambridge. The practice of paying for matches through private betting, rather than gate receipts and sponsorships, survives well into the 20th Century as a "Calcutta," but increasingly gate receipts are the source of legitimate prize purses.

The Amateur Golf Championship of India and the East is instituted, the first international championship event.

1893

The Ladies' Golf Union of Great Britain and Ireland is founded and the first British Ladies Amateur Golf Championship won by Lady Margaret Scott at Royal Lytham & St Annes Golf Club.

The Irish Ladies' Golf Union is founded and is the oldest Ladies Golf Union in the world.

The Chicago Golf Club opens the United States' first 18-hole golf course on the site of the present-day Downers Grove Golf Course. The Chicago Golf Club moved to its current location in 1895.

Victoria Golf Club is formed and remains the oldest course west of the Mississippi on its original site.

1894

The Open is played on an English course for the first time and is won for the first time by an Englishman, J.H. Taylor. Taylor, along with Harry Vardon and James Braid (together known as the Great Triumvirate) would dominate the Open Championship for the next two decades.

The United States Golf Association is founded as the Amateur Golf Association of the United States. Charter members are the Chicago Golf Club, The Country Club, Newport Country Club, St. Andrew's Golf Club, and Shinnecock Hills Golf Club.

The Richmond County Country Club was founded on Staten Island, NY. It is the only private golf course in NYC.

1894 The Otsego Golf Club, Springfield Center, New York, officially opened with 12 holes. Founded by Henry L. Wardwell and Leslie Pell-Clarke, the Otsego Golf Club has operated continuously since 1894 and is a nine-hole course today.

Tacoma Golf Club is founded, the first golf club on the US Pacific Coast.

1895

1895 - Istanbul Golf Club "IGK" formerly known as Constantinople Golf Club is founded - the first golf club in Turkey

The U.S. Amateur is instituted, with Charles B. Macdonald winning the inaugural event. The first U.S. Open is held the following day, with Horace Rawlins winning.

May 1, 1895 - Brooklawn Country Club in Bridgeport, Connecticut, is founded as a nine-hole course. The club operates in the same location today, although the location is now part of Fairfield, Connecticut. The course is now 18 holes, redesigned by A.W. Tillinghast in 1929.

July 6, 1895 - Van Cortlandt Park Golf Course opens - the first public golf course in America.

The pool cue is banned as a putter by the USGA.

The U.S. Women's Amateur is instituted. Mrs. Charles S. Brown (née Lucy N. Barnes) is the first winner.

Cherokee Golf Course in Louisville, Kentucky, was laid out in Cherokee Park and played. Play picked up considerably by 1897 and in 1900 The Committee on Cherokee Park to make the links "safe" to the public was sanctioned. A caretaker for the Cherokee Park Greens was hired for $25 per month. Cherokee Park is part of the Olmsted Park system. Mr Olmsted did not want golf in this park, but the public created, played and the course was ultimately sanctioned and is played today. Cherokee GC is one of the oldest municipal and public golf courses in America.

1896

Harry Vardon wins his first British Open.

Wee Burn Country Club is founded in Darien, Connecticut. A difficult links-style course that pays homage to the home nation of the game—Scotland. "Wee Burn" means "small river" in traditional Scottish dialect.

1897

The first NCAA Championship is held. Louis Bayard, Jr. is the winner.

Golf, America's first golfing magazine, is published for the first time.

1898

The term "birdie" is coined at Atlantic C.C. from "a bird of a hole."

Freddie Tait, betting he could reach the Royal Cinque Ports Golf Club clubhouse from the clubhouse at Royal St George's Golf Club - a three-mile distance - in forty shots or less, puts his 32nd stroke through a window at the Cinque Ports club.

The Haskell ball is designed and patented by Coburn Haskell. It is the first rubber-cored ball.

Church Stretton Golf Club is founded, the oldest 18-hole course in Shropshire and one of the highest courses in England and the United Kingdom.

1899

The Western Open is first played at The Glen View Club in Golf, Illinois, the first tournament in what would evolve into the PGA Tour.

Vesper Country Club is formed in Tyngsboro, Massachusetts.

== 1900–1910 ==
1900

Walter Travis wins the first of his three U.S. Amateurs. Harry Vardon wins the U.S. Open, the first golfer to win both the British and U.S. Opens.

Golf is placed on the Olympic calendar for the 2nd Games at Paris.

1901

The PGA - Professional Golfers' Association (Great Britain & Ireland) is established.

Walter Travis wins his second U.S. Amateur, and becomes the first golfer to win a major title with the Haskell ball, the first rubber-cored golf ball. When Sandy Herd wins the British Open and Laurie Auchterlonie the U.S. Open the next year with the Haskell, virtually all competitors switch to the new ball.

Sunningdale, a course built amidst a cleared forest, opens for play. It is the first course with grass grown completely from seed. Previously, golf courses were routed through meadows, which frequently created drainage problems as the meadows were typically atop clay soil.

The first course at the Carolina Hotel (later the Pinehurst Resort & CC) in Pinehurst, North Carolina, is completed by Donald Ross. Ross will go on to design 600 courses in his storied career as a golf course architect.

Walter Travis publishes his first book, Practical Golf, a tome that received a rave review in The New York Times.

1902

England and Scotland inaugurate an Amateur Team competition, with Scotland winning at Hoylake.

The first grooved-faced irons are invented.

1903

Walter Travis becomes the first three-time U.S. Amateur champion.

Robert Maxwell won the 1903 British Amateur Championship, held at Muirfield, by the score of 7&5 over Horace Hutchinson.

Oakmont Country Club is founded in Oakmont, Pennsylvania, designed by Henry Fownes. It is widely regarded as one of the finest examples of penal-style golf architecture.

1904

Walter Travis becomes the first American to win the British Amateur using the center-shafted, Schenectady putter.

Golf makes its second appearance at the Olympic Games in St. Louis.

1905

John Hamilton Gillespie opens a nine-hole course in Sarasota.

Women golfers from Britain and the United States play an international match, with the British winning 6 matches to 1.

The first dimple-pattern for golf balls is patented by William Taylor in England.

The Complete Golfer by Harry Vardon is published. It promotes and demonstrates the Vardon or overlapping grip.

The Toronto Golf Club hosts the Canadian Open and then again in 1909, 1914, 1921 and 1927.

1906

Goodrich introduces a golf ball with a rubber core filled with compressed air. The "Pneu-matic" proves quite lively, but also prone to explode in warm weather, often in a golfer's pocket. The ball is eventually discontinued; at this time the Haskell ball achieves a dominance of the golf ball market.

1907

Arnaud Massy becomes the first golfer from Continental Europe to win The Open Championship.

1908

Mrs. Gordon Robertson, at Princes Ladies GC, becomes the first female professional.

The Mystery of Golf by Arnold Haultain is published.

The golf magazine The American Golfer is launched by Walter Travis.

A dispute over the format of the competition leads to the cancellation of the golf tournament at the 1908 Summer Olympics.

The Great Southern Golf Club was the first golf course was in Mississippi.

Fort Wayne Country Club in Fort Wayne, IN was formed.

1909

The USGA rules that caddies, caddymasters and greenkeepers over the age of sixteen are professional golfers. The ruling is later modified and eventually reversed in 1963.

== 1910–1920 ==
1910

The R & A bans the center-shafted putter while the USGA keeps it legal - marking the beginning of a 42-year period with two official versions of The Rules of Golf.

Steel shafts are patented by Arthur F. Knight.

1911

The United States gets its first national standardized handicapping system.

John McDermott becomes the first native-born American to win the U.S. Open. At 19 years of age, he is also the youngest winner to date.

1912

John Ball wins his eighth British Amateur championship, a record not yet equalled.

1913

Francis Ouimet, age 20, becomes the first amateur to win the U.S. Open, defeating favorites Harry Vardon and Ted Ray in a play-off.

The first professional international match is played between France and the United States at La Boulie Golf Club, France.

1914

Formation of The Tokyo Club at Komozawa kicks off the Japanese golf boom.

Harry Vardon wins his sixth Open Championship, a record to this day (Peter Thomson and Tom Watson have since won five Opens each).

1915

The Open Championship is discontinued for the duration of the First World War.

1916

The PGA of America is founded by 82 charter members and the PGA Championship is inaugurated. Jim Barnes is the first champion.

The first miniature golf course opens in Pinehurst, North Carolina.

Francis Ouimet is banned from amateur play for his involvement with a sporting goods business. The ruling creates a stir of protest and is reversed in 1918.

1917

The PGA Championship and the U.S. Open are discontinued for the duration of the First World War.

1919

The R & A assumes control over The Open Championship (British Open) and The Amateur Championship (British Amateur).

Pebble Beach Golf Links opens as the Del Monte G.L. in Pebble Beach, California.

== 1920–1930 ==
1920

The USGA founds its famed Green Section to conduct research on turfgrass.

The first practice range is opened in Pinehurst, North Carolina.

The Professional Golfer of America is first published which, today known as PGA Magazine, is the oldest continually-published golf magazine in the United States.

A golf tournament is scheduled for the 1920 Summer Olympics in Antwerp but it is ultimately cancelled.

1921

The R & A limits the size and weight of the ball.

1922

Walter Hagen becomes the first native-born American to win The Open Championship. He subsequently becomes the first professional golfer to open a golf equipment company under his own name.

The Walker Cup Match is instituted. Two direct descendants of Walker Cup founder George Herbert Walker would become President of the United States—his grandson George H. W. Bush, the 41st President, and his great-grandson George W. Bush, the 43rd President.

The Prince of Wales is elected Captain of the R & A.

The Texas Open is inaugurated, the second-oldest surviving PGA Tour event.

Pine Valley Golf Club opens in New Jersey.

1923

The West and East courses at Winged Foot Golf Club in Mamaroneck, New York open for play, designed by A.W. Tillinghast.

1924

Joyce Wethered wins her record fifth consecutive English Ladies' Championship.

The Olympic Club in San Francisco opens for play.

The USGA legalizes steel shafted golf clubs. The R & A does not follow suit until 1929, widening the breach in The Rules of Golf.

1925

The first fairway irrigation system is developed in Dallas, Texas.

Deep-grooved irons are banned by both the USGA and the R & A.

1926

Men's golf in Great Britain and Ireland gets its first standardized handicapping system.

Jess Sweetser becomes the first native-born American to win the British Amateur.

Bobby Jones wins the British Open.

Gate money is instituted at the British Open.

Walter Hagen defeats Bobby Jones 12 and 11 in a privately sponsored 72-hole match in Florida.

The Los Angeles Open is inaugurated, the third-oldest surviving PGA Tour event. It is also the first tournament to offer a $10,000 purse.

1927

The inaugural Ryder Cup Matches are played between Britain and the United States.

Creeping bentgrass is developed for putting greens by the U.S. Department of Agriculture.

1928

Cypress Point Club opens, designed by Alister MacKenzie.

1929

Walter Hagen wins The Open Championship for the fourth time.

Seminole Golf Club opens in Palm Beach, Florida, from a design by Donald Ross.

Cobleskill Golf & Country Club opens in upstate New York. It remains the only golf course in Schoharie County.

== 1930–1940 ==
1930

Bobby Jones completes the original Grand Slam, winning the U.S. and British Amateurs and the U.S. and British Opens in the same year. Since Jones is an amateur, however, the financial windfall belongs to professional Bobby Cruickshank, who bets on Jones to complete the Slam, at 120-1 odds, and pockets $60,000. Jones, perhaps satisfied that he has achieved all he can in the game, retires from competition aged 28 to practice law full-time (and to found a new club that would become known as Augusta National).

The Minehead Club makes Captaincy elective. They had been the last club to award the Captaincy to the winner of the annual competition.

The Duke of York (later King George VI) is elected Captain of the R & A.

Shinnecock Hills Golf Club opens its modern course on Long Island, New York.

Bob Harlow is hired as manager of the PGA's Tournament Bureau, and he first proposes the idea of expanding "The Circuit," as the Tour is then known, from a series of winter events leading up to the season ending North and South Open in spring, into a year-round Tour.

In 1926 under the approval of Gov. Wallace R. Farrington and guidance of longtime local politicians Eddie Tam and then chairman Sam Kalama, a plan for constructing Waiehu Municipal Golf Course was born. Maui County engineers went to work on creating 9 holes of municipal golf along the coast of Maui's Waihee north shore beach. The golf course was completed in 1930 making it Maui's first and only municipal golf course for the working class men and women of Maui. Golf was such a huge success on Maui that the course was later expanded to 18 holes, it still exists today as a hidden Maui County treasure.

1931

Billy Burke defeats George Von Elm in a 72-hole playoff at Inverness to win the 1931 U.S. Open, in the longest playoff ever played. They were tied at 292 after regulation play, and both scored 149 in the first 36-hole playoff. Burke is the first golfer to win a major championship using steel-shafted golf clubs.

The USGA increases the minimum size of the golf ball from 1.62 inches to 1.68 inches, and decreases the maximum weight from 1.62 ounces to 1.55. The R & A does not follow suit. The lighter, larger "balloon ball" is universally despised and eventually the USGA raises the weight back to 1.62 ounces.

1932

The first Curtis Cup Match is held at Wentworth in England.

The concave-faced wedge is banned.

Gene Sarazen is credited with the introduction of the sand-wedge. Sarazen wins both the British and U.S. Open titles in 1932, becoming only the second man (after Bobby Jones) to achieve the feat.

Walter Hagen wins a fifth Western Open. At the time, and until the 1950s, the Western Open was considered among the most important tournaments, behind only the National Opens and the PGA Championship (of which Hagen won eleven in total) in status.

1933

The Prince of Wales reaches the final of the Parliamentary Handicap Tournament.

Augusta National Golf Club, designed by Alister MacKenzie with advice from Bobby Jones, opens for play.

Craig Wood hits a 430-yard (393 m) drive at the Old Course's fifth hole in the British Open; this is still the longest drive in a major championship. Wood loses a playoff for the championship to Denny Shute. Gene Sarazen finishes third, and later in the year wins the PGA Championship.

Hershey Chocolate Company, in sponsoring the Hershey Open, becomes the first corporate title sponsor of a professional tournament.

The Golf Club Managers' Association is formed in the UK (originally called the Association of Golf Club Secretaries). Two years later it launches Course and Club House magazine (now called Golf Club Management), the third oldest golfing magazine in the world that is still running.

1934

The first Masters is played. Horton Smith is the first champion. In this inaugural event, the present-day back and front nines were reversed.

Olin Dutra wins the U.S. Open by a shot from Gene Sarazen.

Henry Cotton wins his first British Open, at Royal St. George's, and shoots a 65 in his second round, a feat that was commemorated by the "Dunlop 65" golf ball. Sid Brews, winner of the South African, French and Dutch Opens in 1934, enjoys his best finish at a British Open, in second place.

The official U.S. PGA Tour is created, built around events like the major championships, Western Open and Los Angeles Opens which pre-dated it. Paul Runyan is the first official Money List leader.

1935

Glenna Collett Vare wins the U.S. Women's Amateur a record sixth time.

Pinehurst #2 is completed by Donald Ross, generally described as his masterpiece.

Gene Sarazen double-eagles the par-5 15th hole to catch the leaders at The Masters. His "Shot Heard Round the World" propels him to victory, and due to the coverage of his feat, propels both the game of golf and Augusta National to new heights of popularity.

1936

Johnny Fischer becomes the last golfer to win a major championship (the U.S. Amateur) with hickory-shafted clubs.

Harry Cooper finishes second at both the Masters and the U.S. Open, where he breaks the all-time tournament record only for Tony Manero to better it. Cooper would finish in the top four of major championships eleven times in his career without winning one.

1937

The Bing Crosby Pro-Am is inaugurated in San Diego. A few years later it moves to the Monterey Peninsula, where it remains to this day.

Henry Cotton wins his second British Open at Carnoustie, from a field that includes the entire U.S. Ryder Cup side, including Snead, Nelson, Hagen, Sarazen and Guldahl.

1938

The British amateurs score their first victory over the United States in the Walker Cup Match at the Old Course.

Ralph Guldahl retains his U.S. Open crown, becoming only the fourth man to win back-to-back titles.

The Palm Beach Invitational becomes the first tournament to make a contribution to charity-$10,000.

The 14-club rule is instituted by the USGA.

The USGA also begins a two-year trial of the first major modification to the stymie. An obstructing ball within 6 inches (15 cm) of the hole could be marked and moved regardless of the distance between the balls. The USGA made this rule permanent in 1941, but the Royal and Ancient Golf Club never made this change.

1939

Byron Nelson wins the U.S. Open at Philadelphia Country Club after a 3-man playoff against Craig Wood and Denny Shute. Sam Snead, needing a 5 at the last hole to win the championship, takes 8, and misses even making the playoff. The U.S. Open would remain the only major championship Snead never won.

== 1940–1945 ==
1940

The British Open and Amateur are discontinued for the duration of the Second World War. Golf courses all over the United Kingdom are converted to airfields or otherwise given over to anti-air and anti-invasion defences.

1942

The U.S. Open is discontinued for the duration of the war. A world-wide shortage of rubber, a vital military supply, creates a shortage and huge price increase in golf balls. Sam Snead manages to complete an entire four-day tournament playing one ball, but the professional circuit is severely curtailed.

The U.S. government halts the manufacture of golf equipment for the duration of the war.

1943

The PGA Championship is cancelled for the year, and The Masters is discontinued for the duration of the war.

1944

The PGA expands its tour to 22 events despite the absence of many of its star players due to military service.

1945

Byron Nelson wins 18 tournaments in a calendar year to set an all-time PGA Tour record-including a record 11 in a row and a record 19 consecutive rounds under 70. His total prize earnings during his 11-win streak, $30,000, is less than last place money for the PGA Tour Championship by 1992.

The Tam O'Shanter Open offers a then-record purse of $60,000.

In Japan, the Shimofusa Country Club (also known as the Musashino Country Club), once the premier golf course in the Tokyo area, is appropriated by the Imperial Japanese Army Air Service and converted into a fighter airfield as part of efforts to combat allied air raids. Post-war it will eventually become Shimofusa Air Base.
