= 1867 in sports =

1867 in sports describes the year's events in world sport.

== Football ==
England

- Formation of the Sheffield FA, which continues to promote its own Sheffield Rules. The Sheffield FA establishes the local Youdan Cup, the first organised football tournament, which is won by Hallam FC.
- 4 September — The Wednesday founded by members of the Wednesday Cricket Club in Sheffield. As is so often the case, a football club is founded by cricketers who need a winter activity to keep fit. The club name acknowledges that Wednesday was the day on which members take an afternoon off work for practice. The Wednesday is originally based at Bramall Lane, then a multi–sports complex that had originally opened for cricket in 1854.

Scotland

- Queen's Park founded in Glasgow; it is the oldest association football club in Scotland.

== Baseball ==
National championship

- National Association of Base Ball Players champion – Union of Morrisania

Events

- The National baseball club of Washington (original Washington Nationals) tours from Ohio to Missouri, playing ten matches in 17 days. Like the Excelsiors tour of New York state in 1860, the Nationals boost the game and demonstrate advanced points of play to fans and players. Several top teams will tour on a similar national scale in the next few years.

== Boxing ==
Events

- Publication of the Marquess of Queensberry rules which had been written in 1865. These rules prescribe the use of gloves, the ten second count, the three minute round and the one minute's rest between rounds.
- 10 May — Jimmy Elliott defeats Bill Davis in the 9th round at Point Pelee Island in Canada. Davis has now lost to both Elliott and Mike McCoole who continue to claim the American Championship, but these two will never meet in the ring.
- 31 August — McCoole defeats Aaron Jones in the 34th round at Busenbord's Station, Ohio.
- 15 October — Jem Mace is due to defend the English Championship against Ned O'Baldwin in London but the bout is prevented by the authorities. There is by this time considerable opposition to bareknuckle boxing in England and fights are becoming impossible to stage at all, let alone profitably. Mace reacts to the latest ban by taking his trade to America, leaving the English Championship as a dead title. Competitive boxing in Great Britain is effectively terminated until after the foundation of the National Sporting Club in 1891.
- The demise of bareknuckle boxing in England is consistent with the spread of Victorian ethics and morality. The influential newspaper industry has fuelled distaste for prizefighting by widely publicising the brutality of the 1860 Heenan–Sayers fight. The Queensberry Rules with their demand for gloves and timings are an establishment reaction to the furore and are designed to "clean up" a sport that is out of touch with Victorian values.

== Cricket ==
Events

- George Wootton's tally of 142 wickets breaks his own record for an English season

England

- Most runs – Thomas Humphrey 946 @ 26.27 (HS 144)
- Most wickets – George Wootton 142 @ 11.58 (BB 8–15)

== Golf ==
Major tournaments

- British Open – Tom Morris senior

== Horse racing ==
Events

- Inaugural running of the Belmont Stakes is won by Ruthless

England

- Grand National – Cortolvin
- 1,000 Guineas Stakes – Achievement
- 2,000 Guineas Stakes – Vauban
- The Derby – Hermit
- The Oaks – Hippia
- St. Leger Stakes – Achievement

Australia

- Melbourne Cup – Tim Whiffler

Canada

- Queen's Plate – Wild Rose

Ireland

- Irish Derby Stakes – Golden Plover

USA

- Belmont Stakes – Ruthless

== Lacrosse ==
Events

- William George Beers, a Canadian dentist, rewrites the rules written by the Montreal Lacrosse Club in 1856.
- First lacrosse game using Beers' rules is played at Upper Canada College, who lose to the Toronto Cricket Club by a score of 3–1.

== Rowing ==
The Boat Race

- 13 April — Oxford wins the 24th Oxford and Cambridge Boat Race

Other events

- Four oarsmen from Saint John, New Brunswick, Canada win the World Championship in Paris, becoming Canada's first world champions and earning the "Paris Crew" nickname.

== Rugby football ==
Events

- Foundation of Wasps RFC
