= George Wootton =

English cricketer

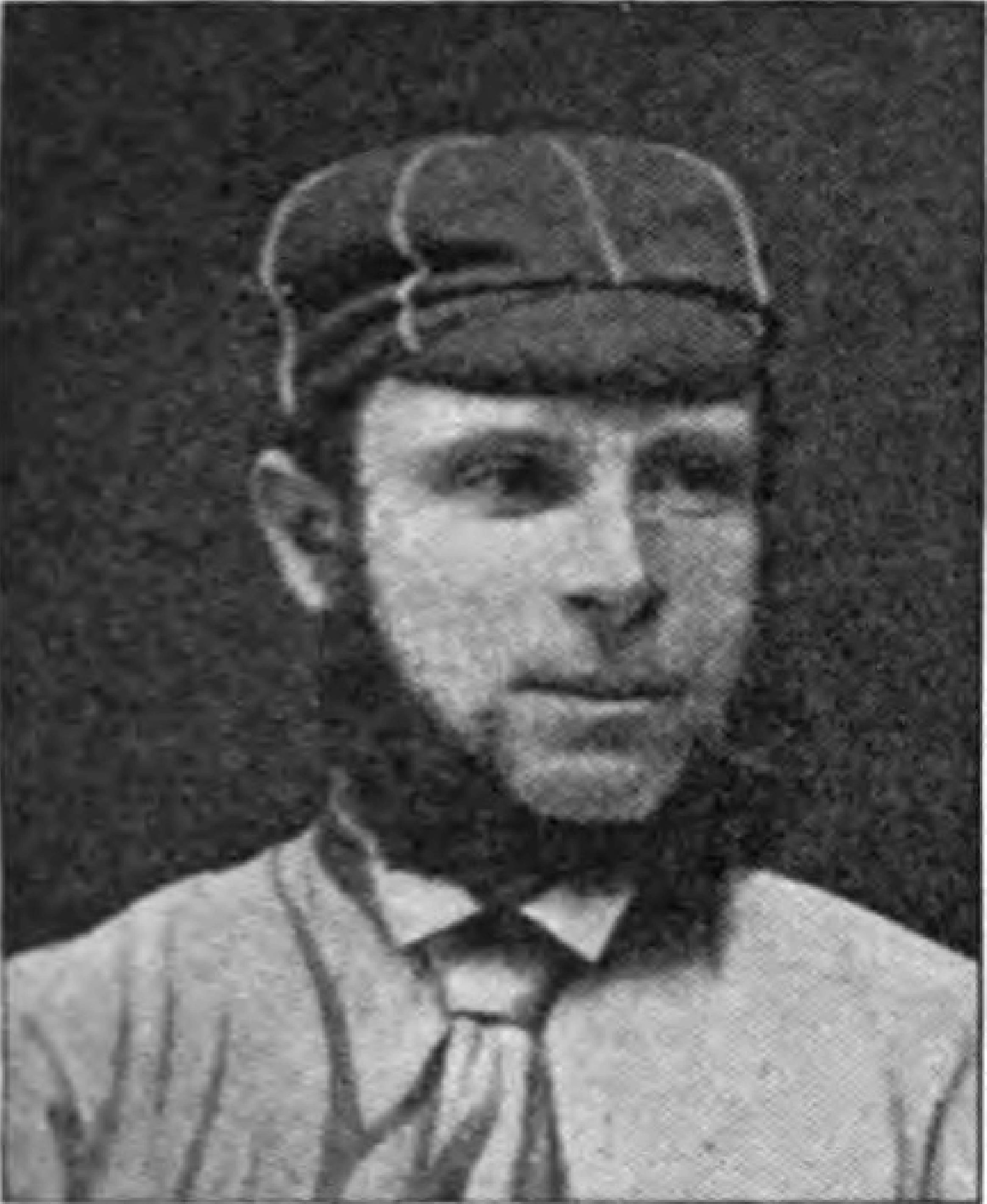

Personal information
- Born: 16 October 1834; Clifton, Nottinghamshire, England
- Died: 15 June 1924 (aged 89); Ruddington, Nottinghamshire, England
- Batting: Left-handed
- Bowling: Left-arm fast-medium

Career statistics
Competition	First-class
Matches	186
Runs scored	2,431
Batting average	10.43
100s/50s	0/5
Top score	64*
Balls bowled	36,125
Wickets	983
Bowling average	13.00
5 wickets in innings	87
10 wickets in match	34
Best bowling	10/54
Catches/stumpings	143/0
- Source: CricketArchive, 9 May 2022

George Wootton (1834–1924) was an English cricketer.

== Biography ==
Born 16 October 1834, Clifton, Nottinghamshire, England; Wootton joined the All England Eleven in 1860 but did not play his first first-class match until the following season, when with five for 25 against Surrey at Trent Bridge, he established himself as a member of the county side and was to remain a regular for a decade.

However, it was when Wootton joined the ground staff at Lord's the following season that he became famous. A round-arm fast-medium left hand bowler, who skilfully varied his speed off a run of merely two paces, Wootton was exactly suited to the rough Lord's wickets of the 1860s. On these wickets, where no heavy roller was ever used and the grass was cut by a scythe that left rough tufts on the surface, there were typically stones formed from the drying of the clayey soils and balls which hit these stones could either become dead shooters or fly right over a batsman's and wicket-keeper's head. Wootton's low delivery allowed him to bowl, according to contemporaries, even more shooters than such terrifying bowlers as Jackson, Tarrant and George Freeman. It was normal for batsmen facing Wootton at Lord's to receive two shooters in each four-ball over and in tandem with veteran Jimmy Grundy, Wootton was almost unplayable.

In his first Lord's game for the MCC Wootton took fourteen for 46 and bowling eight men in his first innings and on the strength of this performance he played one game in the Canterbury Week for "England" against Kent. The following year Wootton took eighty-seven wickets for 9.74 and again was deadly against Sussex, but it was already noted that Wootton was not a formidable bowler on other southern grounds where the light roller then in use was adequate for true bounce. At Hove, Wootton did achieve the unusual feat of adding 106 for the tenth wicket with Ralph Forster – almost the first time a century was added for the last wicket in a first-class match.

In 1864, the difference in his and Grundy's deadliness between Lord's and other grounds was graphically seen when at Lord's the pair bowled out Oxford University for 44 and the newly formed Middlesex club for a record-low 20 – but were hit by the same two teams for 439 at Oxford and 411 at the soon-to-be-demolished Cattle Market Ground. 1865 saw no advance on his previous three years despite taking ten wickets in an innings against a very weak Yorkshire eleven, but as Grundy gradually declined with age Wootton came to take on more responsibility for the Marylebone Club and even for Nottinghamshire, where he was always second fiddle to Grundy, Cris Tinley or Jem Shaw. He also established himself as a regular for the Players and other representative elevens, though he did little apart from six for 24 on a Kennington Oval pitch spoiled by rain where the Gentlemen came back and won well.

1867 was Wootton's most successful season ever with 142 wickets in just nineteen games; though he again failed against the Gentlemen where Alfred Lubbock and E.M. Grace made large scores, he was more terrifying than ever elsewhere until August. The exceptionally hot and dry summer of 1868, however, saw him lose a little of his deadliness with thirty-six fewer wickets, but Wootton recovered this ground for one last time in 1869 before, at the beginning of the 1870s, losing his skill for good just before the heavy roller and motor mower eliminated the shooters that made him so feared. Wootton took ninety wickets in 1870, but was so ineffective after May in 1871 with the first extensive use of heavy rollers, as to drop out of first-class cricket at the end of July with a mere ten wickets in eight games. A few deadly games in 1872 suggested he was still capable of terrorising batsmen at Lord's, but around this time Wootton showed an interest in giving up cricket for a career as a farmer, which he did following a benefit in 1873.

Wootton stood as a first-class umpire from 1871 to 1883. In 1921, his eighty-seventh year, he watched the first Test match ever played at Trent Bridge. He died on 15 June 1924 at Ruddington, Nottinghamshire, England
