= Haultain =

Haultain is a surname, and may refer to:

- Arnold Haultain, British writer
- Frederick W. Haultain, politician in Canada West
- Frederick W. A. G. Haultain, premier of the Canadian Northwest Territories and son of Frederick W. Haultain
- H. E. T. Haultain, Canadian engineer and inventor
- Lynne Haultain, Australian radio broadcaster
- Theodore Haultain, New Zealand politician
- Willem Haultain de Zoete, Dutch admiral

== See also ==
- Haultain, Saskatoon in Canada, named for Frederick W. A. G. Haultain
