= Kenner, Louisiana =

Kenner
- City
- City of Kenner
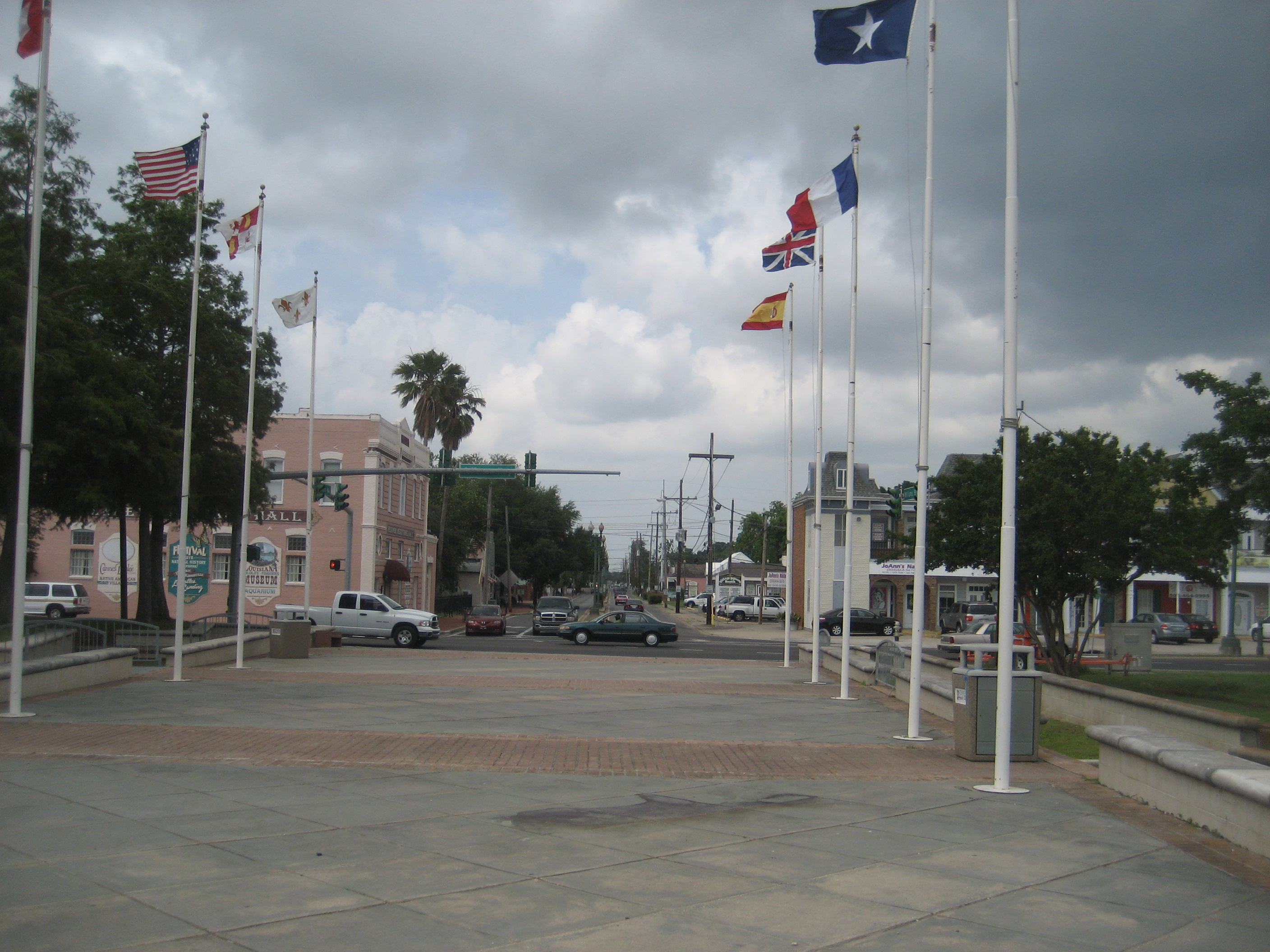
- Rivertown district

- Flag Seal

- Location of Kenner in Jefferson Parish, Louisiana

- Location of Louisiana in the United States
- Coordinates: 30°00′35″N 90°15′18″W
- Country: United States
- State: Louisiana
- Parish: Jefferson
- Founded: March 2, 1855; 171 years ago
- Incorporated: 1867; 159 years ago
- Reincorporated: April 1, 1873; 153 years ago
- Reincorporated: December 13, 1913; 112 years ago

Government
  - Mayor: Michael J. Glaser (R)

Area
  - Total: 15.11 sq mi (39.14 km^{2})
  - Land: 14.89 sq mi (38.56 km^{2})
  - Water: 0.22 sq mi (0.58 km^{2}) 00.7%
- Elevation: −7 ft (−2.1 m)

Population (2020)
  - Total: 66,448
  - Rank: JE: 1st LA: 6th
  - Density: 4,462.9/sq mi (1,723.12/km^{2})
- Time zone: UTC-6 (CST)
  - Summer (DST): UTC-5 (CDT)
- Area code: 504
- FIPS code: 22-39475
- GNIS feature ID: 2404820
- Website: kenner.la.us

Kenner is a city in the U.S. state of Louisiana. It is the most populous city in Jefferson Parish, and is the largest incorporated suburb of New Orleans. The population was 66,448 at the 2020 census, making it the sixth-most populous city in Louisiana.

== History ==
In 1855, Kenner was founded by Minor Kenner on land that consisted of three plantation properties Oakland, Belle Grove and Pasture that had been purchased by the Kenner family. At the time, all land north of what is now Airline Highway was swampland.

In Kenner on May 10, 1870, "Gypsy" Jem Mace defeated Tom Allen for the heavyweight championship of the bare-knuckle boxing era; a monument marks the spot near the river end of Williams Boulevard.

From 1915 to 1931, a New Orleans streetcar line operated between New Orleans and Kenner. The line ran between the intersection of Rampart and Canal in New Orleans and the intersection of Williams Blvd and Jefferson Hwy in Kenner.

Kenner's growth began in the late 1950s when developers began subdividing, draining and filling the swampland in the northern half of the city. During the 1960s, the construction of Interstate 10 and improvements to Veterans Memorial Highway aided the rapid development of Kenner as a suburb of New Orleans.

In 1982, Pan Am Flight 759 crashed in a residential area of Kenner when a microburst forced it down. Eight people on the ground were killed, as were all 145 people aboard the aircraft. Six houses were completely destroyed and five more substantially damaged.

In October 2017, an explosion on the surface of an oil rig platform in Lake Pontchartrain north west of the Treasure Chest Casino injured seven people.

== Geography ==
According to the United States Census Bureau, the city has a total area of 15.2 square miles (39 km^{2}), of which 15.1 square miles (39 km^{2}) is land and 0.1 square miles (0.26 km^{2}) (0.7%) is water.

The city of Kenner is located on the west side of Greater New Orleans, in Jefferson Parish. Its boundaries are Lake Pontchartrain to the north, the Mississippi River to the south, the unincorporated areas of Metairie and River Ridge to the east, and St. Charles Parish to the west.

== Demographics ==
Historical population
Census	Pop.	Note	%±
1880	970		—
1890	953		−1.8%
1900	1,253		31.5%
1920	1,882		—
1930	2,440		29.6%
1940	2,375		−2.7%
1950	5,535		133.1%
1960	17,037		207.8%
1970	29,858		75.3%
1980	66,382		122.3%
1990	72,033		8.5%
2000	70,517		−2.1%
2010	66,702		−5.4%
2020	66,448		−0.4%
2025 (est.)	65,136	▼	−2.0%
U.S. Decennial Census

Kenner city, Louisiana – Racial and ethnic composition Note: the U.S. Census Bureau treats Hispanic/Latino as an ethnic category. This table excludes Latinos from the racial categories and assigns them to a separate category. Hispanics/Latinos may be of any race.
Race / Ethnicity (NH = Non-Hispanic)	Pop 2000	Pop 2010	Pop 2020	% 2000	% 2010	% 2020
White alone (NH)	42,148	32,564	26,586	58.77%	48.82%	40.01%
Black or African American alone (NH)	15,725	15,650	14,275	22.30%	23.46%	21.48%
Native American or Alaska Native alone (NH)	228	147	115	0.32%	0.22%	0.17%
Asian alone (NH)	1,980	2,434	3,149	2.81%	3.65%	4.74%
Native Hawaiian or Pacific Islander alone (NH)	24	15	23	0.03%	0.02%	0.03%
Other race alone (NH)	99	210	441	0.14%	0.31%	0.66%
Mixed race or Multiracial (NH)	711	764	1,918	1.01%	1.15%	2.89%
Hispanic or Latino (any race)	9,602	14,918	19,941	13.62%	22.37%	30.01%
Total	70,517	66,702	66,448	100.00%	100.00%	100.00%

In 2013, there were 66,975 living in Kenner, down from 70,517 people in 2000. The population density was 4,486.0 people per square mile. There were 28,076 housing units. In 2000, there were 70,517 people, 25,652 households, and 18,469 families residing in the city. The population density was 1,798.3 people/km^{2} (4,658 people/mi^{2}). There were 27,378 housing units at an average density of 698.2 units/km^{2} (1,808 units/mi^{2}). At the 2020 U.S. census, the city's population declined to 66,448.

During the 2019 American Community Survey, the racial and ethnic makeup of Kenner was 64.6% non-Hispanic white, 23.8% Black or African American, 0.5% American Indian or Alaska Native, 3.7% Asian, 5.4% some other race, and 2.3% two or more races. In 2013, the racial makeup of the city was 48.8% White, 34.7% African American, 12.1% Hispanic or Latino, 0.4% Native American, 3.7% Asian, 3.80% from other races, and 2.24% from two or more races. In 2000, the racial makeup of the city was 68.12% White, 22.55% African American, 0.40% Native American, 2.84% Asian, 0.06% Pacific Islander, 3.80% from other races, and 2.24% from two or more races. 13.62% of the population were Hispanic or Latino of any race. Reflecting the nationwide demographic shift in 2020, 40.01% were non-Hispanic white, 21.48% Black or African American, 0.17% American Indian and Alaska Native, 4.74% Asian, 0.03% Pacific Islander, 3.55% multiracial or some other race, and 30.01% Hispanic or Latino American of any race.

In the Hispanic and Latin American population of Kenner, 12 of the city's tracts have Hispanic or Latino populations of 15% or more in 2010. By 2011, many businesses catering to Hispanics and Latin Americans had opened in Kenner. A portion of north Kenner is called "Little Honduras." Kenner's Hispanic Resource Center offers English as a second language classes and after school programs.

== Economy ==
At one time L'Express Airlines had its headquarters in Kenner.

== Arts and culture ==
=== Library and planetarium ===
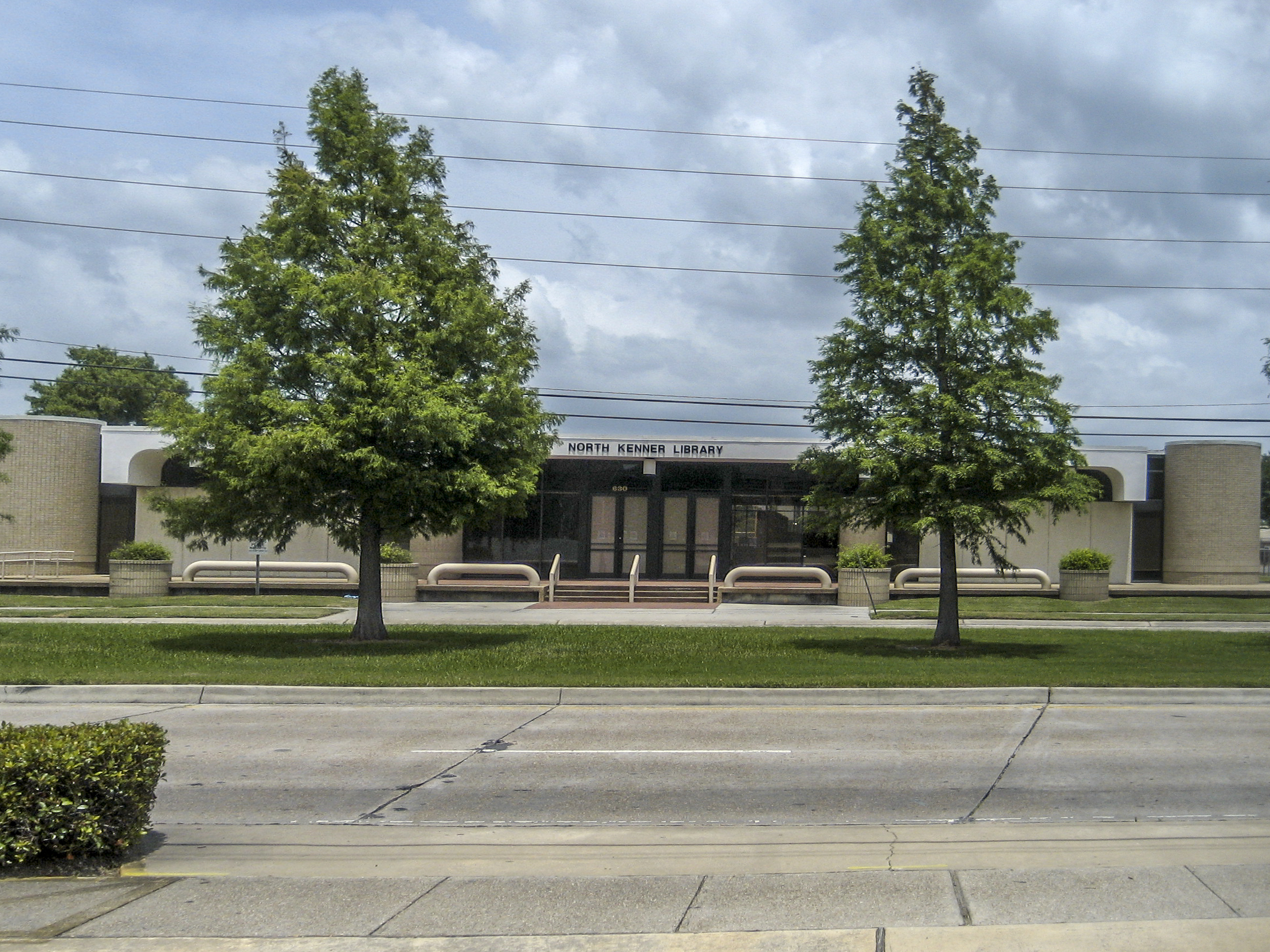
North Kenner Library

Jefferson Parish Library operates the North Kenner Library.

=== Places of interest ===
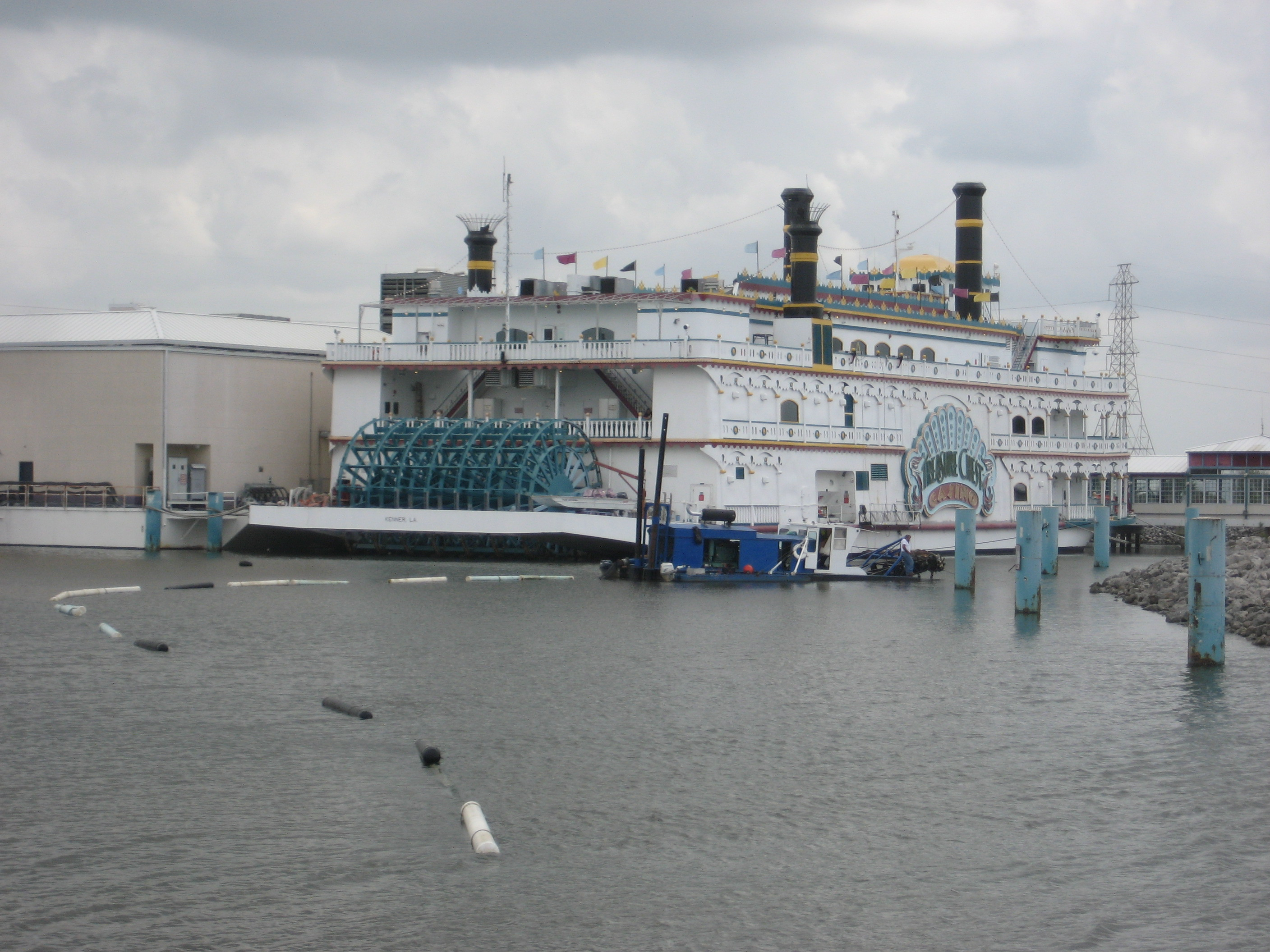
Treasure Chest Casino

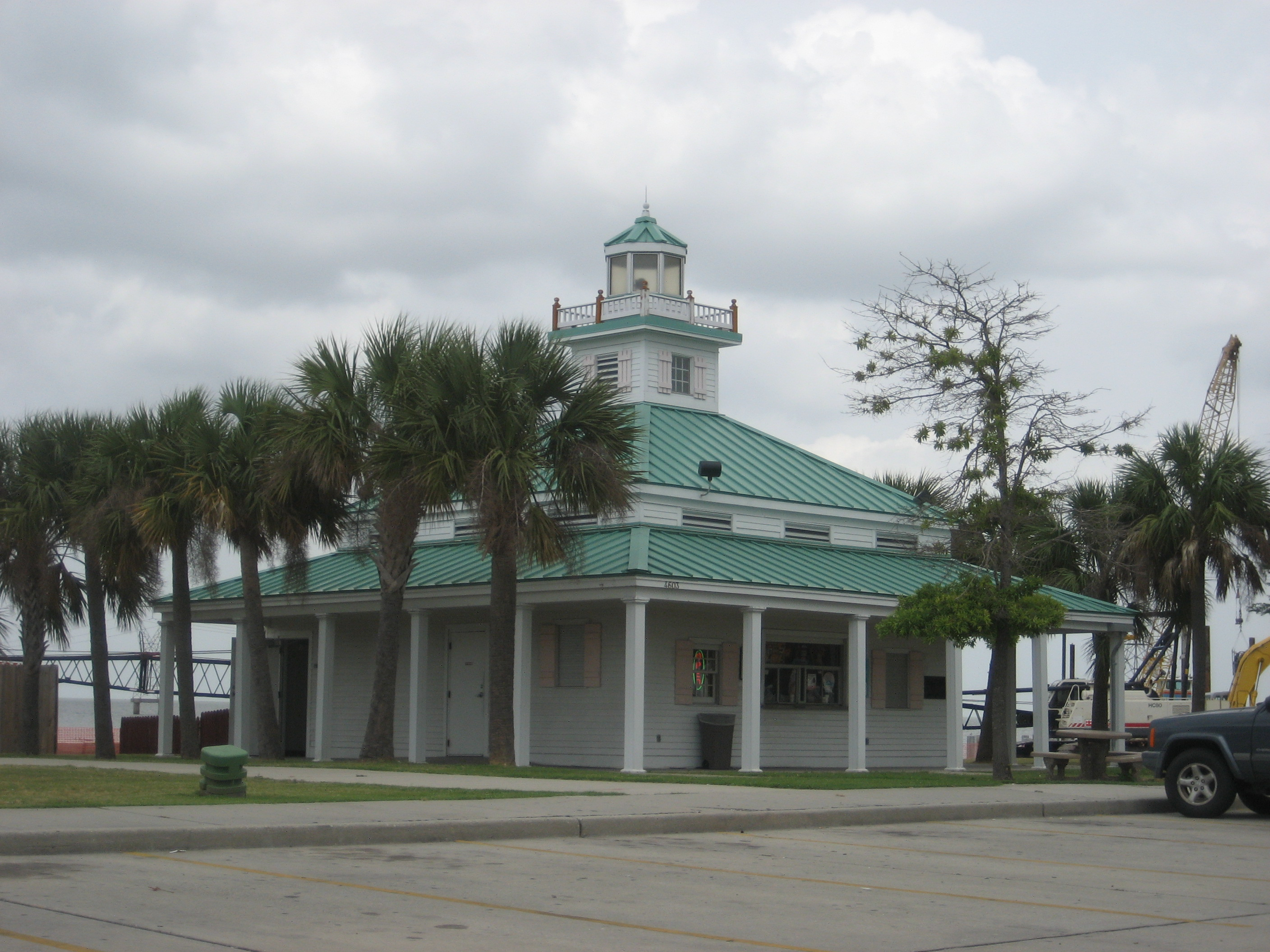
Lighthouse concession stand at Kenner's Laketown development

The following are located in Kenner:

- A. J. Muss Bertolino Playground – Ed Daniels Field at Muss Bertolino Stadium is a 1,500-seat stadium that hosts high school football, lacrosse and soccer games. The stadium was also the home for the New Orleans Jesters professional soccer team. An athletics all-weather running track surrounds the field. The playground also has a gymnasium, multiple baseball parks and a softball field.
- Chateau Golf and Country Club.
- Coconut Beach Volleyball Complex – 22 court sand volleyball complex, and the largest man-made sand complex in the United States.
- The Esplanade Mall – Opened in 1983, as of 2023, all but abandoned. Plans are underway to redevelop the mall. Only a Target store and a Regal Cinema movie theatre remain open at the site..
- Laketown – A park built with a boat launch, two piers, pavilions, a jogging/biking path, and a concession stand and bait house.
- Pontchartrain Center – Opened in 1991, it is the second-largest convention center in the New Orleans metro area.
- Rivertown – The historic district with museums, shops, and cultural resources. Located there are the Rivertown Repertory Theatre, Kenner Heritage Park, Kenner Planetarium, and Rivertown Science Center.
- Treasure Chest Casino.

== Government ==
The mayor of Kenner is Michael Glaser.

Kenner is represented in the Louisiana House of Representatives by the Republican attorney Debbie Villio. The state senator is Republican Kirk Talbot, a former state House member. Kenner is part of Louisiana's 1st Congressional district, presently represented in the U.S. House by Steve Scalise.

== Education ==
=== Primary and secondary schools ===
Kenner is served by the Jefferson Parish Public School System.

Kenner originally had one high school, Alfred Bonnabel High School, which is located on the border between Metairie and Kenner. Most areas in Kenner are zoned to this high school, while some areas in the southeast are zoned to East Jefferson High School in Metairie.

Kenner Discovery Health Sciences Academy, a public charter school, was founded in 2013. It has an elementary campus in Metairie and secondary campuses in Kenner.

Previously, some areas were zoned to Grace King High School in Metairie. King closed in 2023.

Theodore Roosevelt Middle School and Kenner Discovery Health Sciences Academy are the two middle schools in Kenner. In addition to Roosevelt and Kenner Discovery, middle schools serving sections of Kenner include Adams Middle and Harris Middle in Metairie, and Riverdale Middle in Jefferson.

Jefferson Parish public elementary schools include:

- A.C. Alexander Elementary School
- John James Audubon Elementary School
- Chateau Estates Elementary School
- John Clancy Elementary School
- Greenlawn Terrace Elementary School
- Walter Schneckenberger Elementary School
- Granville T. Woods Elementary

In regards to the advanced studies academies, students are zoned to Airline Park Academy.

Washington Elementary School in Kenner closed in 2023.

Private schools include:

- First Baptist Christian School
- Our Lady of Perpetual Help School (Roman Catholic Archdiocese of New Orleans). The school, the parish school of St. Mary's Roman Catholic Church, opened in 1928. In 1951 an annex to the school opened. Another building with classrooms and a gymnasium was dedicated in 1956, and the current school building was dedicated in 1961. The Mercy Center, which houses school offices and a library, gymnasium, and a dedicated room for music classes, was dedicated in August 2004.
- St. Elizabeth Ann Seton School (Roman Catholic Archdiocese of New Orleans)
- Islamic School of Greater New Orleans (ISGNO)

== Media ==
The Kenner Star is Kenner's free monthly community newspaper. Kenner is served primarily by New Orleans–based media outlets.

== Infrastructure ==
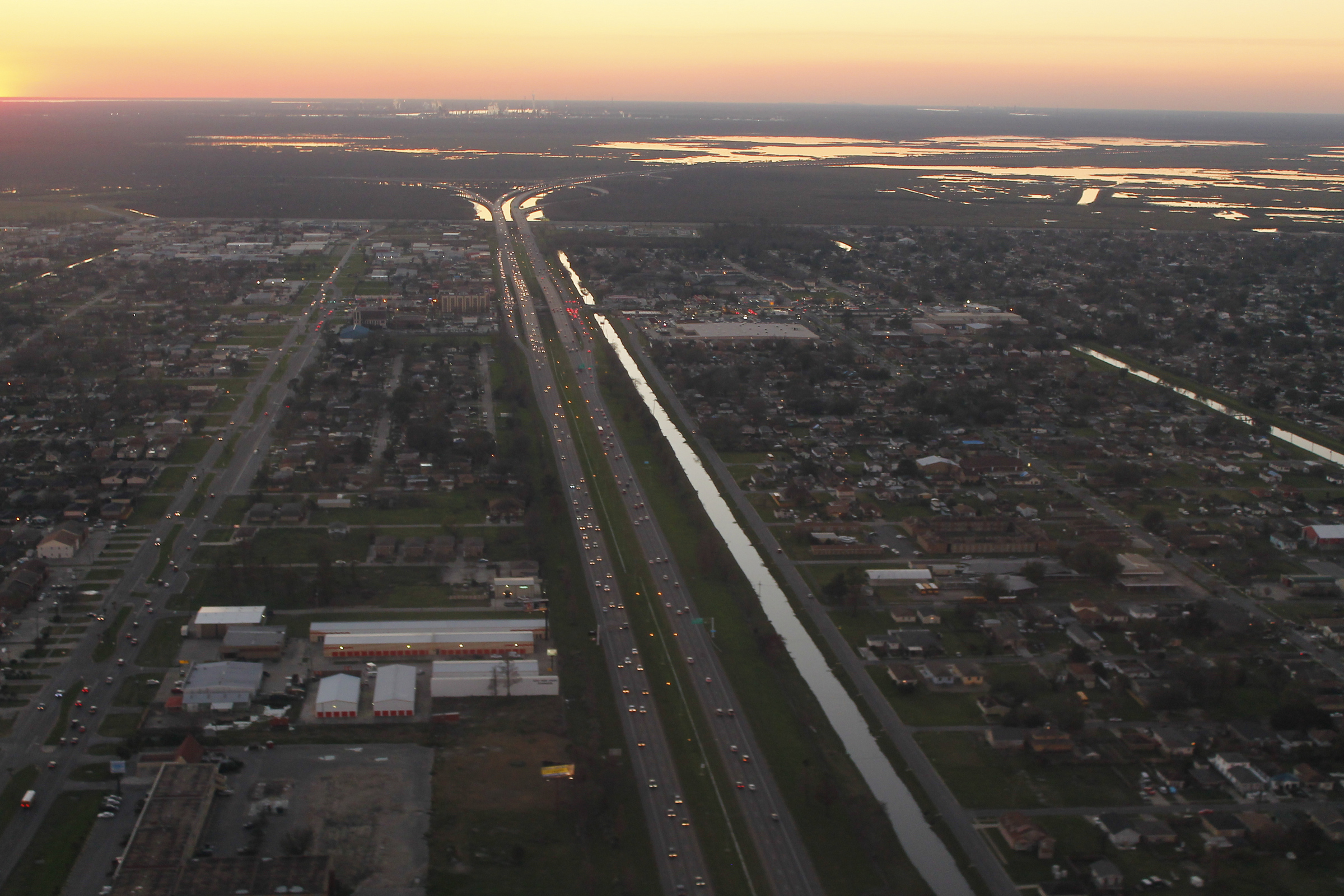
Interstate 10 in Kenner

=== Transportation ===
==== Buses ====
Public transportation in the city is operated by the Jefferson Parish Department of Transit Administration which operates Jefferson Transit. Jefferson Transit provides service to points in Kenner, Metairie and New Orleans as well as other locations in incorporated and unincorporated Jefferson Parish.

==== Roads ====
Kenner is served by Interstate 10, which travels east–west through the city. Traveling westbound from the city line there are exits at Power Blvd., LA 49 (Williams Blvd.)/32nd St. New Orleans Int'l Airport, and Loyola Dr.

In addition, the interstate, U.S. Route 61 (generally signed as Airline Dr.) travels east–west through the southern end of the city. LA 49 (signed as Williams Blvd) is the city's primary north–south corridor.

==== Airport ====
The Louis Armstrong New Orleans International Airport (IATA: MSY), the main commercial airport for the New Orleans metropolitan area, is located within the city limits, just south of Interstate 10. It serves as a major tax-revenue generator for the city.

=== Health care ===
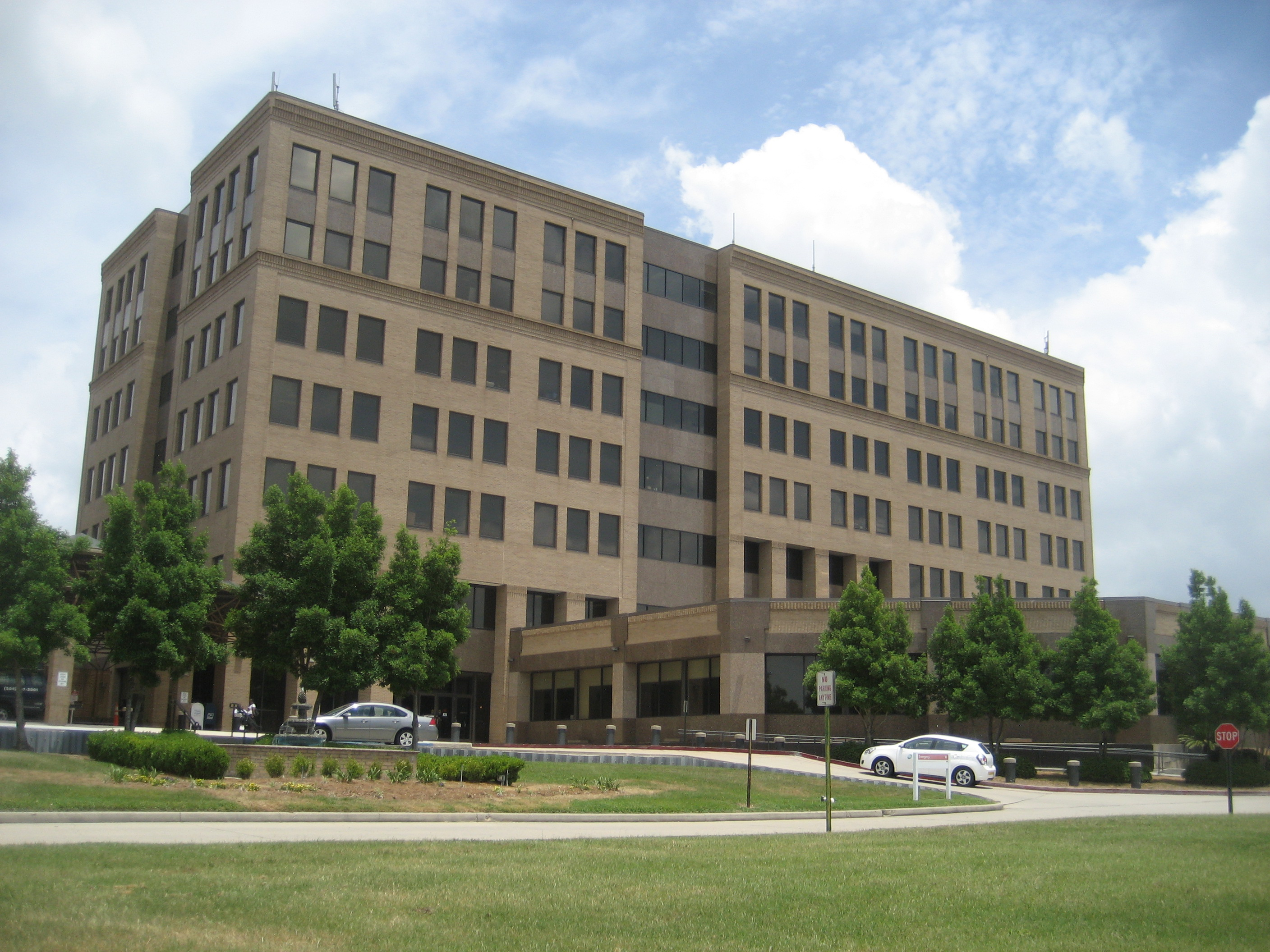
Ochsner Medical Center - Kenner

- Ochsner Medical Center - Kenner – one of the major hospitals in the New Orleans metro area.

== Notable people ==
- Jon Batiste – Musician and composer; composed a song, entitled I'm from Kenner.
- Aaron Broussard – Former Jefferson Parish President, 2003-2010.
- Chris Howard – Former NFL player.
- Chris Kenner (1929–1976) – R&B singer and songwriter.
- Wynton Marsalis, trumpeter, composer, music instructor, and the artistic director of Jazz at Lincoln Center; grew up in Kenner.
- Arthur Maulet – NFL player.
- Edmond J. Muniz – Former Mayor of Kenner and captain of the Krewe of Endymion.
- Lloyd Price – R&B vocalist known as "Mr. Personality."
