= 1870 in sports =

1870 in sports describes the year's events in world sport.

== American football ==
College championship

- College football national championship – Princeton Tigers

Events

- Columbia Lions joins the college football circuit and loses to Rutgers Scarlet Knights in its only game. Princeton Tigers beats Rutgers. Columbia doesn't play Princeton.

== Association football ==
Scotland

- Formation of Stranraer FC

International

- 5 March — the first international match between England and Scotland is a 0–0 draw at Kennington Oval but it is not officially recognised by FIFA as there is no Scottish FA in existence at the time

== Baseball ==
National championship

- National Association of Base Ball Players champion – Chicago White Stockings

Events

- Openly there are fifteen professional teams in the field. Harvard college's strongest team tours during the summer and wins 6 of 16 against the pros.
- 14 June — Atlantic of Brooklyn defeats the Cincinnati Red Stockings 8 to 7 in 11 innings, the first Red Stockings defeat since 3 October 1868.

== Boxing ==
Events

- 10 May — Jem Mace returns to competitive boxing and fights Tom Allen, nominally for the now-defunct English Championship at Kennerville, Louisiana. Mace wins with a tenth-round knockout which confirms that he is still the best English fighter. Claims are made on behalf of Mace that he is also the holder of the American Championship and this fight was the first world heavyweight championship bout. Having not fought either Jimmy Elliott or Mike McCoole and strong anti-British sentiment within the mostly Irish-American boxing community at that time, these claims are still debated.
- 12 December — American Championship claimant Jimmy Elliott is arrested and convicted of highway robbery and assault with intent to kill. He is sentenced to 16 years and 10 months at the Eastern Penitentiary in Philadelphia, eventually serving more than eight years.
- Elliott's rival Mike McCoole is inactive this year but, with Elliott out of contention, McCoole has the strongest claim to the American Championship with Mace now his main rival.

== Cricket ==
Events

- 2, 3 & 4 June — Gloucestershire County Cricket Club plays its initial first-class match v. Surrey at Durdham Downs, near Bristol.
- Formation of Derbyshire County Cricket Club

England

- Most runs – W. G. Grace 1,808 @ 54.78 (HS 215)
- Most wickets – James Southerton 210 @ 14.62 (BB 8–67)

== Golf ==
Major tournaments

- British Open – Tom Morris junior

== Horse racing ==
Events

- Inaugural running of the Irish Grand National at Fairyhouse Racecourse is won by Sir Robert Peel.

England

- Grand National – The Colonel (second consecutive win)
- 1,000 Guineas Stakes – Hester
- 2,000 Guineas Stakes – Macgregor
- The Derby – Kingcraft
- The Oaks – Gamos
- St. Leger Stakes – Hawthornden

Australia

- Melbourne Cup – Nimblefoot

Canada

- Queen's Plate – John Bell

Ireland

- Irish Grand National – Sir Robert Peel
- Irish Derby Stakes – Billy Pitt

USA

- Belmont Stakes – Kingfisher

== Rowing ==
The Boat Race

- 6 April — Cambridge wins the 27th Oxford and Cambridge Boat Race

Other events

- In Australia, the inaugural Australian Universities Boat Race is won by Melbourne in 31 mins 4 seconds

== Rugby football ==
Events

- Foundation of Leeds RLFC
- Alcock's Football Annual lists approximately 75 clubs playing Rugby School football rules. These clubs have different interpretations of the laws as played at Rugby School.
- The Nelson club of New Zealand starts to play Rugby School rules, the first club in that country to do so.
- May 14 - The first game of rugby in New Zealand is played in Nelson between Nelson College and the Nelson Rugby Football Club.
- In November, an anonymous surgeon writes to The Times complaining that Rugby football is dangerous. The letter fuels agreement in the sport to form a ruling body which will regulate the laws.

== Yacht racing ==
America's Cup

- 8 August — the New York Yacht Club wins the first America's Cup challenge race, as Magic defeats British challenger Cambria, of the Royal Thames Yacht Club.
