= 1858 in sports =

1858 in sports describes the year's events in world sport.

== Baseball ==
National championship

- National Association of Base Ball Players champion – New York Mutuals

Events

- "All New York" and "All Brooklyn" Nines play three matches at the Fashion Race Course in Queens, with the All New York Nine winning the first and third. The series is a great leap forward for commercial baseball.

== Boxing ==
Events

- 5 January — Tom Sayers defeats Bill Benjamin in only three rounds at the Isle of Grain and now challenges Tom Paddock for the undisputed Championship of England.
- 16 June — Sayers and Paddock finally meet at Canvey Island where Sayers wins in 21 rounds to become the undisputed English champion.
- 20 October — John Morrissey at last defends the Championship of America at Long Point in Canada against John C. Heenan. Heenan breaks two knuckles early in the fight which ends after the 11th round with Heenan unable to continue.

== Cricket ==
Events

- John Jackson's season tally of 102 known wickets is a new record and he is the first bowler credited with 100 in a first-class season

England

- Most runs – William Caffyn 516 @ 21.50 (HS 102)
- Most wickets – John Jackson 102 @ 11.03 (BB 9–27)

== Football ==
Events

- Blackheath Rugby Club founded. It claims to be the world's oldest "open" rugby football club given that Liverpool FC (see 1857 in sports) is no longer a single entity.
- Edinburgh Academicals RFC is founded and is the oldest football club (all codes) in Scotland.
- 21 October — first written version of the Sheffield Rules is introduced at the first annual general meeting of Sheffield FC for use in its matches

== Australian rules football ==
- What is believed to be the first match of the then called Victorian Rules Football is played between the students of St Kilda Grammar School and Melbourne Grammar School.
- There are reports of formal clubs being present in Albert Park and Richmond.
- A match taking place over three days is played between Melbourne Grammar School and Scotch College. The game is declared a 1-1 draw. The two schools have competed annually since for the Cordner–Eggleston Cup.

== Horse racing ==
England

- Grand National – Little Charley
- 1,000 Guineas Stakes – Governess
- 2,000 Guineas Stakes – Fitz-Roland
- The Derby – Beadsman
- The Oaks – Governess
- St. Leger Stakes – Sunbeam

== Rowing ==
The Boat Race

- 27 March — Cambridge wins the 15th Oxford and Cambridge Boat Race

Other

- 26 May — Brown, Harvard, Trinity, and Yale boat clubs confer as the College Regatta Association but it never conducts a championship
