= 1887 in sports =

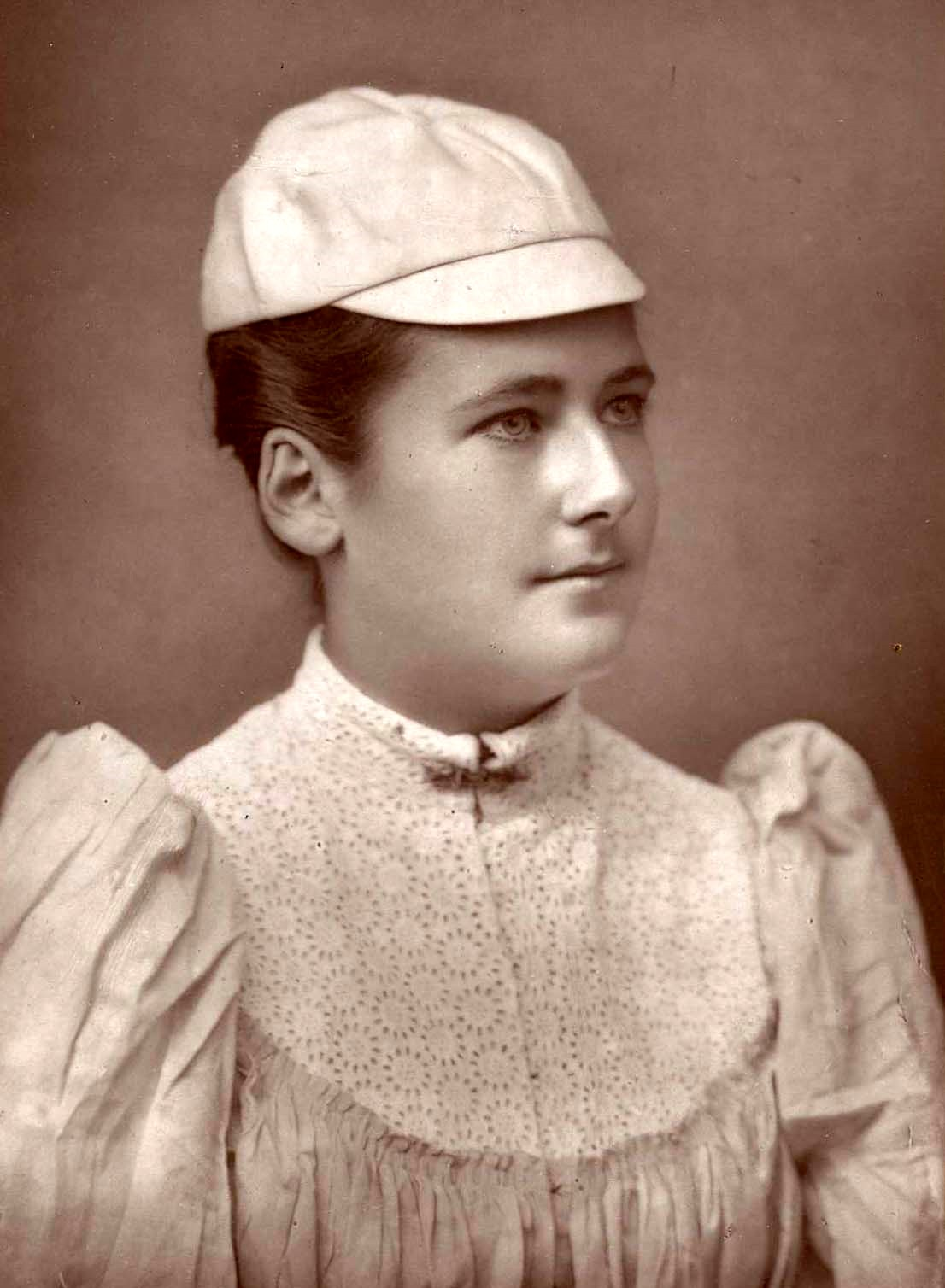
Lottie Dod – the youngest ever Wimbledon champion

1887 in sports describes the year's events in world sport.

== Athletics ==
- USA Outdoor Track and Field Championships

== American football ==
College championship

- College football national championship – Yale Bulldogs

Events

- The rules are changed so that gametime is set at two halves of 45 minutes each (as in Association football). Two paid officials, a referee and an umpire, are mandated for each game.

== Association football ==
England

- FA Cup final – Aston Villa 2–0 West Bromwich Albion at The Oval
- Barnsley FC and Blackpool FC are founded

Germany

- Hamburger SV founded as one of the oldest clubs in Germany

Scotland

- Scottish Cup final – Hibernian 2–1 Dumbarton

== Australian rules football ==
Events

- Carlton Football Club wins the Victorian Football Association premiership
- Norwood Football Club wins the South Australian Football Association premiership
- Unions Football Club wins the Western Australian Football Association premiership

== Baseball ==
National championship

- National League v. American Association – Detroit Wolverines (NL) defeats Saint Louis Cardinals (AA) 10 games to 5

Events

- The two major leagues agree to a unified set of rules.
- The National Colored Base Ball League plays for a few weeks before folding.
- Five black men play in the International League, the highest minor league, the high-water mark in racial integration of professional baseball.

== Boxing ==
Lineal world champions

- World Heavyweight Championship – John L. Sullivan
- World Middleweight Championship – Jack Nonpareil Dempsey
- World Lightweight Championship – Jack McAuliffe

== Canadian Football ==
- The Canadian Rugby Football Union ceases to exist after the exit of the ORFU.
- Winnipeg beats St John's to win the inaugural Manitoba championship.
- Montreal and Ottawa College both remain champions of the QRFU and ORFU respectively.
- Ottawa beats Montreal 10-5 for the Dominion Championship.

== Cricket ==
Events

- The English cricket team in Australia in 1886–87, generally known as Alfred Shaw's XI, is described by Wisden as "one of the strongest that ever left England for the Colonies". The team plays 10 first-class matches, winning 6 with 2 draws and 2 defeats (both against New South Wales). England win both Test matches played by 13 runs and 71 runs respectively.

England

- Champion County – Surrey
- Most runs – W. G. Grace 2,062 @ 54.26 (HS 183*)
- Most wickets – George Lohmann 154 @ 15.61 (BB 8–36)

Australia

- Most runs – Arthur Shrewsbury 721 @ 48.06 (HS 236)
- Most wickets – Charlie Turner 70 @ 7.68 (BB 8–32)

== Gaelic football ==
- 7 February — Irish forms of football are formally arranged into an organised playing code by the Gaelic Athletic Association, the rules being drawn up by Maurice Davin and published in the United Ireland magazine. The GAA seeks to promote traditional Irish sports, such as hurling and to reject "foreign" (particularly English) imports.
- Limerick GAA wins the inaugural All-Ireland Senior Football Championship.

== Golf ==
Major tournaments

- British Open – Willie Park junior

Other tournaments

- British Amateur – Horace Hutchinson

== Horse racing ==
England

- Grand National – Gamecock
- 1,000 Guineas Stakes – Reve d'Or
- 2,000 Guineas Stakes – Enterprise
- The Derby – Merry Hampton
- The Oaks – Reve d'Or
- St. Leger Stakes – Kilwarlin

Australia

- Melbourne Cup – Dunlop

Canada

- Queen's Plate – Bonnie Duke

Ireland

- Irish Grand National – Eglentine
- Irish Derby Stakes – Pet Fox

USA

- Kentucky Derby – Montrose
- Preakness Stakes – Dunboyne
- Belmont Stakes – Hanover

== Hurling ==
- Tipperary GAA wins the first All–Ireland Senior Hurling Championship

== Ice hockey ==
- February 25 - The Montreal Hockey Club defeats Montreal Victorias 1–0 to win the 1887 Montreal Winter Carnival Ice Hockey Tournament.
- March 11 - The Montreal Crystals defeat the Montreal Victorias 3–2 to win the inaugural 1887 AHAC championship on the final challenge of the season, despite having a record of two wins and four losses.

== Rowing ==
The Boat Race

- 26 March — Cambridge wins the 44th Oxford and Cambridge Boat Race

== Rugby football ==
Home Nations Championship

- Scotland wins the 1887 Home Nations Championship, which is the 5th series

== Softball ==
Events

- George Hancock invents an indoor baseball game that would become known as softball in Chicago, Illinois (USA) on November 24.

== Tennis ==
Events

- American champion Richard D. Sears retires from the sport after winning the US singles title for the seventh successive time, a record that still stands

England

- Wimbledon Men's Singles Championship – Herbert Lawford (GB) defeats Ernest Renshaw (GB) 1–6 6–3 3–6 6–4 6–4
- Wimbledon Women's Singles Championship – Lottie Dod (GB) defeats Blanche Bingley (GB) 6–2 6–0

USA

- American Men's Singles Championship – Richard D. Sears (USA) defeats Henry Slocum (USA) 6–1 6–3 6–2
- American Women's Singles Championship – Ellen Hansell (USA) defeats Laura Knight (USA) 6–1 6–0

== Yacht racing ==
America's Cup

- The New York Yacht Club retains the America's Cup as Volunteer defeats British challenger Thistle, of the Royal Clyde Yacht Club, 2 races to 0
