= 1867 Grand National =

English steeplechase horse race

- Grand National
- Location: Aintree
- Date: 6 March 1867
- Winning horse: Cortolvin
- Starting price: 16/1
- Jockey: John Page
- Trainer: Harry Lamplugh
- Owner: Duke of Hamilton
- Conditions: Good

The 1867 Grand National was the 29th renewal of the Grand National horse race that took place at Aintree near Liverpool, England, on 6 March 1867.

== The Course ==
The course this year was described as consisting of twelve jumps, which had to be jumped twice. However this most likely referred only to the course beyond the lane and not the three jumps which were only taken once, two on the first circuit and one on the second. This count, is accurate to previous descriptions of the course in the years leading up to this time. The usage of the term Canal Turn was coming back into fashion, having not been widely used in the last decade or so. The Water jump was more commonly being described as the Stand Water instead of the Artificial Brook of previous eras.

First circuit: Fence 1 {15} Ditch Fence 2 {16} Ditch and Bank, Fence 3 {17} Double Rails, Fence 4 {18} Rails and Ditch, Fence 5 {19} Becher's Brook Fence 6 {20} Post and Rails, Fence 7 {21} Post and Rails Fence 8 {22} Canal Turn, often recently referred to as the extreme turn Fence 9 {23} Valentine's Brook, Fence 10 {24} Ditch and Quickset, Fence 11 {25} Post and Rails, Fence 12 {26} Stump Hedge and Ditch.

The runners then crossed the lane at the canal bridge to re-enter the racecourse proper, turning at the first opportunity towards the fences in front of the stands. Fence 13 Gorse Hurdle, Fence 14 Stand Water Jump.

Second circuit: The runners then turned away from the Grandstands again and crossed what had been known in the 1850s as Proceed's Lane, following the same circuit until reaching the racecourse again. This time the runners continued to the wider extreme of the course before turning to run up the straight in front of the stands where Fence 27 Hurdle had to be jumped.

The runners then bypassed the Gorsed Hurdle and Stand Water inside before reaching the winning post in front of the Main Stand.

== Leading Contenders ==
King Arthur was sent off as the 5/1 favourite after both major anti post favourites Columbia and Surney were withdrawn in the days before the race. The mount would be Captain Harford's first in the race.

Shakespeare was sent off as 7/1 second favourite in partnership with duel winner, Alec Goodman as his tenth ride in the race.

Fan, the mare was an 8/1 shot and a second ride in the race for Arthur Thorpe.

Sea King was sent off at 12/1 and was partnered by another of the six riders making their debut, G Barry.

Globule was 100/8 and a recent winner at Croydon and was a fifth ride in the race for George Holman, who had yet to complete the course since finishing fourth on his debut.

The best of the dark horses was considered to be Shangarry at 100/7 and last year's runner up, Cortolvin at 100/6

== The Race ==
With a threat of snow, the runners were sent off after a long delay with the Irish veteran, Thomastown leading them over the lane towards the first fence where a usual scrimmage occurred, though none of the twenty-three runners came to grief. The Favourite rushed to the front approaching the second fence only to virtually refuse, although he lost only a little ground and was still tracking the leading group approaching the third fence where Whitehall was cannoned into by Havelock, the former coming to grief.

The twenty-two survivors were led over Becher's for the first time by Cortolvin, followed by Sea King, Globule, Miller and Silver Star, followed by Marengo having moved through the field well after a poor start.

The Canal Turn brought a melee that almost put paid to the chances of Fan who ran wide and was able to continue, having lost only a small amount of ground after the refusal of Havelock brought down Hall Court, Astrolabe, Little Frank Banker and Marengo while Little Wideawake was left perched on top of the fence before being able to continue.

Irish hopes were extinguished when Thomastown broke down badly along the Canal side, Murphy walking the horse in and declaring that perhaps it would have been better the horse had broken down years earlier to save bankrupting Ireland.

Globule took up the running re-entering the racecourse and led over the Gorsed Hurdle where Cortolvin blundered and almost came down, badly hampering Tennyson with George Stevens, the most experienced rider in the race, with three previous victories in eleven previous attempts, losing an iron approaching the water jump.

Globule continued on, taking the water ahead of Sea King, King Arthur, Revolver, Genievre, Tennyson, Shangarry, Shakespeare, Cortolvin, Lightheart, Silver Star, Miller, Fan and Plinlimmon with Little Wideawake a long way behind and the remounted Astrolabe, Marengo and Banker tailed off. The latter was quickly pulled up after jumping the water, having broken down so badly that the fate of the horse hung in the balance for over an hour before it was decided that he could be saved.

Globule increased the pace going down to Becher's for the second time until reaching the brook where a collision with Lightheart hampered the former and all but ended the chances of the latter.

Cortolvin now went to the front to take the field back along the Canal side, quickly making the pace too strong for Silver Star, Plinlimmon, Shangarry, Tennyson, Genievre, and Revolver while Shakespeare took one liberty too many with a fence and was almost brought to a standstill to recover. Miller too almost came down and was quickly pulled up leaving Cortolvin, Globule and Fan drawing away from King Arthur, whose earlier efforts to make up lost ground was now telling.

The race lay between the leading trio turning for home with Cortolvin appearing comfortable by the time the final hurdle was reached, Johnny Page doing just enough to maintain a healthy five length advantage over Fan at the finish. Shangarry came upsides Globule on the run in to fight out and just claim an exiting battle for third. Lightheart came through tired horses to canter in fifth while another eight were close enough to be counted by the judge.

== Finishing Order ==
Position	Name	Jockey	Handicap (st-lb)	SP	Distance	Colours
Winner	Cortolvin	Johnny Page	11-13	100-6	5 Lengths	Cerise, french grey sleeves and cap
Second	Fan	Arthur Thorpe	10-3	8-1	4 Lengths	Brown, white cap
Third	Shangarry	Tommy Pickernell	10-13	100-7	Neck	Cerise, white sash and cap
Fourth	Globule	George Holman	11-7	100-8	12 Lengths	Light blue, yellow and black sash, black cap
Fifth	Lightheart	E. Jones	11-1	40-1		Indigo
Sixth	Revolver	Pat Igoe	11-1	100-1		Pink, black cap
Seventh	Shakespeare	Alec Goodman	11-1	7-1		Orange and brown stripes, black cap
Eighth	Tennyson	George Stevens	10-10	50-1		Brown, light blue cap
Ninth	Silver Star	George Waddington	10-9	25-1		Buff, orange sleeves, black cap
Tenth	Genievre	George Ede	10-3	20-1		Cerise, blue sleeves and cap
Eleventh	Plinlimmon	John Holman	10-13	100-1		Indigo
Twelfth	King Arthur	Captain Harford	10-3	5-1 Fav		Blue and whites hoops, white cap
Thirteenth and last	Sea King	G. Barry	10-11	12-1		Red, yellow cap
Fence 27 {Final Hurdle}	Miller	Capt John {Piggy} Lawrence	11-1	100-1	Pulled up turning for home	Blue and white stripes, black cap
Fence 10 {Ditch & Quickset}	Thomastown	James Murphy	11-3	25-1	Pulled Up, Broke Down	White, blue cap
Fence 8 {Canal Turn}	Astrolabe	J. Cassidy	12-7	20-1	Brought Down, Continued tailed off and pull up 2nd circuit	Brown, red cap
Fence 8 {Canal Turn}	Banker	T. Ablett	11-10	100-1	Brought Down, remounted and broke down	Brown, red cap
Fence 8 {Canal Turn}	Hall Court	Capt. Brown	12-3	50-1	Brought Down	Cerise, white sash and cap
Fence 8 {Canal Turn}	Havelock	Bill Jarvis	10-3	100-1	Fell	Black, yellow sash, black cap
Fence 8 {Canal Turn}	Little Frank	James Knott	10-13	25-1	Brought Down	Cerise, orange sleeves, black cap
Fence 8 {Canal Turn}	Little Wideawake	John Rickaby	10-3	30-1	Brought Down, Remounted tailed off and pulled up 2nd circuit	Green, orange sleeves and cap
Fence 8 {Canal Turn}	Marengo	C. Fermin	11-1	100-1	Brought Down, Remounted, Pulled Up after 1st circuit	Red, white cap
Fence 3 {Double Rails}	Whitehall	Milward	10-13	40-1	Hampered & Fell	Purple and white hoops, purple cap

== Aftermath ==
There was initially some concern when John Page weighed in, only to come up light on the scales. A ribbon was tied to Cortolvin in the winner's enclosure while his bridle was removed and brought to Page, who then got the thumbs up from the stewards. This was also much to the relief of owner, The Duke of Hamilton, who, on the brink of financial ruin, wagered everything he had on Cortolvin and won what would have been the equivalent of £2 million in 2025.

Two horses broke down badly during the race, the Irish veteran Thomastown who was promptly retired with jockey Murphy joking that it might have been better for Ireland's finances had it happened years earlier. The other, Banker was at first thought to be so lame that only the shotgun could save him from further distress. However, after a long evaluation, it was decided the horse could be saved, sparing it from being destroyed.
