= 1861 English cricket season =

Cricket season review

The 1861 English cricket season was the 35th of the roundarm era. (Note: Any match listed in the ACS' Important Match Guide (1981) is historically important, and therefore of the highest standard, whether or not a scorecard might exist. The same applies to numerous matches discovered by researchers since 1981. For further information, see First-class cricket.) Sheffield Cricket Club oversaw the creation of the match fund committee that would become Yorkshire County Cricket Club.

== Important matches ==
- 1861 match list

== Events ==
7 March. A Match Fund Committee to run Yorkshire county matches was established in Sheffield, which had been the home of Yorkshire cricket for nearly 100 years. It was from this fund that Yorkshire County Cricket Club was founded two years later: an exact parallel with the formation of Sussex County Cricket Club from a similar fund (1836–1839).

H. H. Stephenson captained the first English team to tour Australia.

== Leading batsmen ==
Robert Carpenter was the leading runscorer with 883 @ 30.44

== Leading bowlers ==
Edgar Willsher was the leading wicket-taker with 87 @ 11.65

== Bibliography ==
- ACS (1981). A Guide to Important Cricket Matches Played in the British Isles 1709–1863. Nottingham: ACS. OCLC 85045528.
- Warner, Pelham (1946). Lords: 1787–1945. London: Harrap. OCLC 877106024.
