= 1860 English cricket season =

Cricket season review

The 1860 English cricket season was the 34th of the roundarm era. (Note: Any match listed in the ACS' Important Match Guide (1981) is historically important, and therefore of the highest standard, whether or not a scorecard might exist. The same applies to numerous matches discovered by researchers since 1981. For further information, see First-class cricket.) John Jackson took over 100 wickets in the season.

== Important matches ==
- 1860 match list

== Events ==
Freehold of Lord's Ground sold to a Mr Moses for £7,000. MCC did not bid. JH Dark retained the leasehold until 1864.

== Leading batsmen ==
Thomas Hayward was the leading runscorer with 557 @ 26.52

== Leading bowlers ==
John Jackson was the leading wicket-taker with 109 @ 9.20

== Bibliography ==
- ACS (1981). A Guide to Important Cricket Matches Played in the British Isles 1709–1863. Nottingham: ACS. OCLC 85045528.
- Warner, Pelham (1946). Lords: 1787–1945. London: Harrap. OCLC 877106024.
