= 1851 in sports =

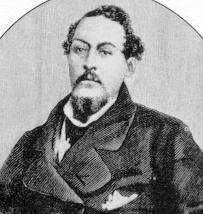
American boxing champion Tom Hyer

1851 in sports describes the year's events in world sport.

== Bandy ==
Events

- By the second half of the 19th century, bandy has become popular among the masses throughout the Russian Empire. Traditionally, the Russians use a longer skate blade than other nations, giving them the advantage of skating faster. However, they find it more difficult to turn quickly. A bandy skate has a longer blade than an ice hockey skate, and the "Russian skate" even longer.

== Baseball ==
Events

- The Knickerbocker Base Ball Club of New York plays two matches with the Washington club, soon afterwards named Gotham. These are the second and third meetings between two clubs under "Knickerbocker Rules" after one played five years earlier. For 1851 to 1853, two annual Knicks-Gothams games are the only known matches between clubs, the Knicks winning all six.

== Boxing ==
Events

- Tom Hyer announces his retirement (though he will make a brief but unsuccessful comeback in 1854) and relinquishes the Championship of America. The title is claimed by Yankee Sullivan who fought Hyer in 1849 but he is not generally recognised.
- 29 September — William Perry defends the Championship of England title against the welterweight Harry Broome at Mildenhall. Perry is disqualified in the 15th round for striking Broome while he is kneeling. Broome is the new English champion.
- 16 December — future champion Tom Paddock fights Harry Poulson at Belper in Derbyshire. Paddock wins in the 86th round but the fight ends in a riot. Paddock and Poulson are both jailed and sentenced to ten months hard labour.

== Chess ==
Events

- Adolf Anderssen and Lionel Kieseritzky play the Immortal Game in London. It is an informal game played during a break in the world's first international chess tournament, which is staged as part of the Great Exhibition.
- Anderssen wins the London tournament and, as he is one of the strongest players of his time, is considered by many to be the first World Chess Champion.

== Cricket ==
Events

- 11 & 12 February — Tasmania v Victoria at Launceston Racecourse is the inaugural first-class match played in Australia. Tasmania wins by 3 wickets.

England

- Most runs – George Chatterton 455 @ 19.78 (HS 88)
- Most wickets – James Grundy 114 @ 9.60 (BB 8–?)

== Horse racing ==
England

- Grand National – Abd-El-Kader (second successive win)
- 1,000 Guineas Stakes – Aphrodite
- 2,000 Guineas Stakes – Hernandez
- The Derby – Teddington
- The Oaks – Iris
- St. Leger Stakes – Newminster

== Lacrosse ==
Events

- Montreal's Olympic Club organises a team to play a game against an indigenous team.

== Rowing ==
The Boat Race

- The Oxford and Cambridge Boat Race is not held this year

== Yacht racing ==
America's Cup

- The yacht America beats the Royal Yachting Squadron in a race around the Isle of Wight, the event leading to the creation of the America's Cup
