= 1856 in sports =

1856 in sports describes the year's events in world sport.

== Baseball ==
Events

- The four established New York (Manhattan) clubs play nine matches between August 30 and October 28. Several other clubs in present New York City play matches against a rival or two. Daily and weekly newspapers cover the game and some matches.
- 17 October — the Eagle club scores 8 against 2 by Gotham, an extreme example of the main problem with the 21–run rule (revised to nine innings next spring).

== Boxing ==
Events

- 26 January — Harry Poulson meets the upcoming Tom Sayers at Appledore, Kent. Sayers enhances his growing reputation by winning in the 109th round.
- 19 May — Harry Broome finally defends the Championship of England against Tom Paddock at Manningtree. Paddock wins in the 51st round and takes the title. Broome announces his retirement.
- 2 October — a scheduled bout between Paddock and former champion William Perry is cancelled because Paddock is ill. Paddock pays forfeit and Perry claims the English title but is not recognised.
- With the American champion John Morrissey refusing to fight again until 1858, the focus shifts to his eventual next opponent, the upcoming John C. Heenan, known as "The Benicia Boy".

== Cricket ==
Events

- Surrey begins a period of dominance in the inter-county game, their team at this time including William Caffyn, Tom Lockyer, Edgar Willsher, H. H. Stephenson and Julius Caesar

England

- Most runs – John Lillywhite 620 @ 24.80 (HS 138)
- Most wickets – John Wisden 73 @ 12.51 (BB 6–33)

== Horse racing ==
England

- Grand National – Freetrader
- 1,000 Guineas Stakes – Manganese
- 2,000 Guineas Stakes – Fazzoletto
- The Derby – Ellington
- The Oaks – Mincepie
- St. Leger Stakes – Warlock

== Lacrosse ==
Events

- The Montreal Lacrosse Club is formed in Montreal by W. George Beers, the first organised lacrosse team. They also develop the first codified rules of lacrosse, which Beers will rewrite in 1867.

== Rowing ==
The Boat Race

- 15 March — Cambridge wins the 13th Oxford and Cambridge Boat Race. The first twelve Races were contested over 27 years from 1829. From 1856 the event will be annual except during the two World Wars.
