= Ralph Forster =

English cricketer and British Army officer

Personal information
- Full name: Ralph Forster
- Born: 21 July 1835; Spring Hill, County Durham, England
- Died: 17 February 1879 (aged 43); Rome, Lazio, Italy
- Batting: Right-handed

Domestic team information
- Years: Team
- 1859: Cambridge University
- 1861–1870: Marylebone Cricket Club

Career statistics
Competition	First-class
Matches	17
Runs scored	117
Batting average	5.57
100s/50s	–/–
Top score	40*
Catches/stumpings	5/–
- Source: Cricinfo, 20 April 2021

Ralph Forster JP (21 July 1835 – 17 February 1879) was an English first-class cricketer and barrister.

The son of Thomas Forster, he was born at Spring Hill in County Durham in July 1835. He was educated at Harrow School, before going up to Caius College, Cambridge. While studying at Cambridge, he made a single appearance in first-class cricket for Cambridge University against the Marylebone Cricket Club (MCC) at Lord's in 1859. A student of Lincoln's Inn, he was called to the bar in January 1860. During his legal career, Forster wrote the book Copyhold and Customary Tenures. Beginning in 1861, Forster began playing first-class cricket for the MCC, making sixteen appearances to 1870. He had little success in these matches, scoring 117 runs at a low average of 5.85 and a highest score of 40 not out. He married Frances Joanna Stone in December 1862. A justice of the peace, he died at Rome in February 1879 from Bright's disease.
