= Tom Allen (boxer) =

English boxer

- Allen circa 1869

Personal information
- Born: Thomas Allen; 23 April 1839 Birmingham, England
- Died: 5 April 1903 (aged 62) St. Louis, Missouri, U.S.
- Height: 5 ft 11 in (1.80 m)
- Weight: 170 lb (77 kg); Weight varied from 136-189; Generally fought at 170 lb

Boxing career

Boxing record
- Total fights: 26 (major fights only)
- Wins: 12
- Win by KO: 2
- Losses: 8
- Draws: 6

Tom Allen (23 April 1839 – 5 April 1903) was a British bare-knuckle boxer who claimed the Heavyweight Championship from 1873, when he defeated Mike McCoole, until 1876, when he lost to Joe Goss. For much of his earlier career he fought just above the middleweight range, around 165-75, making him smaller than most of the heavyweights he met, he became an American citizen later in life.

== Early life ==
Allen was born on 1 April 1840 in Birmingham, England. By the age of 27, he had settled in America, having arrived with his greatest boxing adversary Mike McCoole in New York on 21 July 1867. Allen was a fast, scientific fighter and could deliver solid blows. He possessed considerable courage but sometimes did less well in long fights, lacking the durability to take lengthy punishment.

=== London Prize Ring rules ===
Under the English Broughton rules, if a man went down and could not continue after 30 seconds, the fight ended. Hitting a downed fighter and grasping or hitting below the waist were prohibited. Broughton invented and encouraged the use of "mufflers", a form of padded gloves, which were used in training and exhibitions. The advent of the Broughton rules around 1743 did allow fighters an advantage not enjoyed by modern boxers; a boxer could drop to one knee to start a 30-second count at any point in the match, but overuse of this privilege was frowned upon and sometimes disallowed by the judges. By 1870, when Allen began boxing in earnest, the Broughton Rules, had evolved into the slightly more civilized London Prize Ring Rules promulgated in 1843. Fine scientific boxing with a calculated defense involving feints with the arms and forward foot were rarely a feature of bare-knuckle boxing in the 1870s, nor necessary with the undisciplined nature of London Prize Ring Rules. These rules also outlawed head butting, holding the ropes, strangling, using resin, stones or hard objects in the hands, and biting. Other than gouging, hitting a man when he was down, kicking, or hitting or grabbing below the waist, most moves were permitted, including throwing a man down or holding him to inflict blows.

== Early boxing career highlights ==
Fighting at a lighter weight on 2 June 1864 Allen lost in a battle for the welterweight championship of England to Bob Smith in a 50-round match at Widbury Isle. Some sources give the location as Wilbury Tole. It was Allen's first attempt at an English championship, and his only known attempt at a championship in the welterweight division.

On 28 November 1865, Allen took the middleweight championship of England in a 41-round contest against Posh Price in Staffordshire, England.

=== Attempts at three championships, 1867 ===
After several fights were stopped by Police, Allen and Joe Goss finally met on 5 March 1867 for the Middleweight championship of England in Gloucestershire. According to one account, Goss had a decided lead until the 34th round. Goss's right and Allen's left were somewhat disabled in the fighting, which caused the judges to end the fight in the 35th round in a draw. According to one source, the purse was 400 English pounds per side.

Allen lost to what many consider his most skilled opponent, Mike McCoole in an early career battle on 15 July 1869 at Foster's Island near St. Louis, for the heavyweight championship of America in a ninth round foul. Allen appeared to be nearly the equal of McCoole, the better known boxer, but lost the battle when the foul occurred. In the ninth round, McCoole and Allen clinched and fell rolling around the ring, when it appeared to the judges present that Allen gouged McCoole's eyes, a clear violation of the Broughton Rules. In the opinion of the New York Daily Herald, "Allen outfought McCoole all the way through and to all appearance would have won the fight if he had been allowed to proceed". Allen would face McCoole again with better results. A large fight broke out after the bout that included the use of clubs.

In a title bout for the Heavyweight Championship of America on 17 August 1869, Allen drew with Charley Gallagher at "Foster's Island" near St. Louis, Missouri in eleven rounds. Allen knocked out Gallagher, but the referee called the contest a draw. The eighth was most decisive, with Allen landing repeated blows on Gallagher with little return. In a brutal fight, Gallagher was down in both the ninth and the tenth, and was down in the eleventh from a strong left blow to the mouth. Both boxers were injured, however, and both scored a number of blows, though the St. Louis Globe wrote that the match appeared decisively in Allen's favor, particularly after the seventh round. The Globe also noted that Gallagher's seconds had thrown up the sponge to indicate a knockout loss by their boxer, but that the referee chose to rule the fight a draw nonetheless.

=== Heavyweight title attempt, 1870 ===
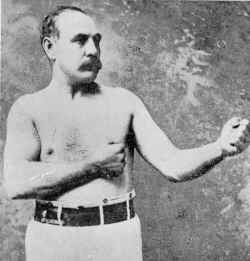
Jem Mace

On 10 May 1870, Allen was dealt a brutal ten round loss from well known middleweight boxer Jem Mace at Kennerville, Louisiana, before a substantial crowd of 2,000, in a title bout for the heavyweight championships of both England and America. Allen's eyes were injured by the eighth, particularly the right one and he took more punishment in the round. Both men attempted to put the other in a headlock unsuccessfully, a strategy permissible by the lax London Prize Rules that governed the fight. By the tenth, Allen had taken too much punishment to stand long, particularly to his eyes, which were battered. At the end of the round Allen threw Mace to the ground, but Allen was the more injured and could not continue the match, his seconds throwing up the sponge. Allen's arm was badly injured or broken. Each contestant received a large purse of $2,500.

== American Heavyweight champion, 1873 ==
Heavyweight champion, Mike McCoole

On the day before the championship fight against Allen and Mike McCoole near St. Louis, both boxers were arrested and required to post a bond of $1,000 to keep the peace. Nonetheless, the fight took place the following day on 23 September 1873 with a seventh round win by Allen at Chouteau Island in Madison County, Illinois. Allen fought at 172, with a sixteen-pound weight disadvantage, and a three-inch disadvantage in height.

The taller McCoole, who many historians considered the more awkward boxer, took the fiercer punishment in the first three rounds, with Allen opening a cut on his right eye, which he continued to pound. By the fourth round, McCoole was down for the first time, and a terrible site to behold. The fifth round saw additional punishment to McCoole, and in the final round Allen started off with several mighty blows to McCoole's face, soon ending the bout. McCoole had a terrible cut under his right eye with damage to his left eye as well, and what appeared to be a broken nose. Spectators begged McCoole's seconds to take him out of the ring, and they soon did. Allen took the bare-knuckle heavyweight championship of America, in only twenty minutes of fighting. Allen had proven he was a superior boxer to McCoole and that what most perceived as his superior performance in their previous meeting, was genuine. The title, in the view of many, was a world championship, and the greatest honor bestowed on Allen in his career. Perhaps due partly to the number of spectators, and the high stakes involved, Allen was arrested two months later on the evening of 23 November for participating in the fight on a requisition from the Governor of Illinois.

On 18 November 1873, Allen drew with Ben Hogan for the Heavyweight championship of America in three rounds at Pacific City, Iowa. A few reports credited Allen with a win, but actually only three rounds were fought and a fight broke out.

== Losing championship, 1876 ==
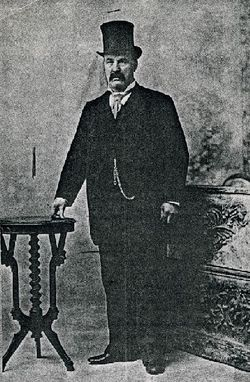
Allen in later life, circa 1897

On 7 September 1876, Allen lost the Heavyweight championship of America to Joe Goss in 34 rounds in Boone County, Kentucky, taking one hour and fourteen minutes. The first seven rounds were fought in Kenton County, Kentucky and ruled a draw. Each side collected $5,000. Many considered the title Allen fought for a world and not just an American title, and most boxing historians today consider the title a heavyweight world title. According to one source, a foul caused when Allen struck Goss when he was down in the 14th, turned the decision in favor of Goss. Some dispute occurred as to whether the blow was deliberate. Several newspaper accounts seemed to agree with Allen that he had the better of the fight and was winning when the foul occurred. Allen claimed to have won the bout, and stated "It seems to me that I cannot get fair play in this country, and I now say I will never again enter the ring". Allen was arrested briefly after the match, as boxing was illegal in Kentucky. Goss was later arrested on 16 September in New York. According to one account, Allen skipped bail to head to England to seek fights, and spend time at the racetracks.

== Heavyweight champion 1877–1878 ==
Allen defeated Tompkin Gilbert on 29 October 1877, in London, England, for a title various described in British newspapers as the Heavyweight Championship of the world, the Championship of Britain or just the Championships, in a seventh-round technical knockout. Gloves and the more modern Queensbury Rules of boxing, adopted widely in 1865, were used in the match.

While still in England, on 4 April 1878, Allen fought Charley Davis to for the heavyweight Championship of Britain in Cambridge, England, before a substantial crowd of 2,000, winning on a foul in five rounds. In a welcome change of events, gloves were used in the match, the newer Queensbury rules were followed for the first time in a championship match, and a British 200 pound prize was offered. Allen had a five-inch height advantage, and Davis was down in the first not long after a terrific blow to the neck. The fourth was fought viciously on both sides with blood streaming from Allen's nose, but equal damage being done to Davis, who went down after four minutes of fighting, ending the round. Davis finally went down in the fifth from a terrific right to his eye which ended the bout, and though Davis's supporters rushed into the ring claiming foul, the decision was for Allen.

=== Vacating English championship ===
In his last professional fight, Allen again fought for the Heavyweight championship of England and a 400-pound purse against Jem Stewart on 22 April 1879 in London. The bout resulted in a 24-round draw and was fought with gloves using Queensbury Rules. The fighting was not brutal, lacking heavy blows to the disappointment of many spectators, until the seventeenth when Allen appeared to have a slight advantage. A large crowd attended, including several members of the aristocracy. Allen relinquished the Heavyweight Championship of Britain.

== Boxing retirement, and death ==
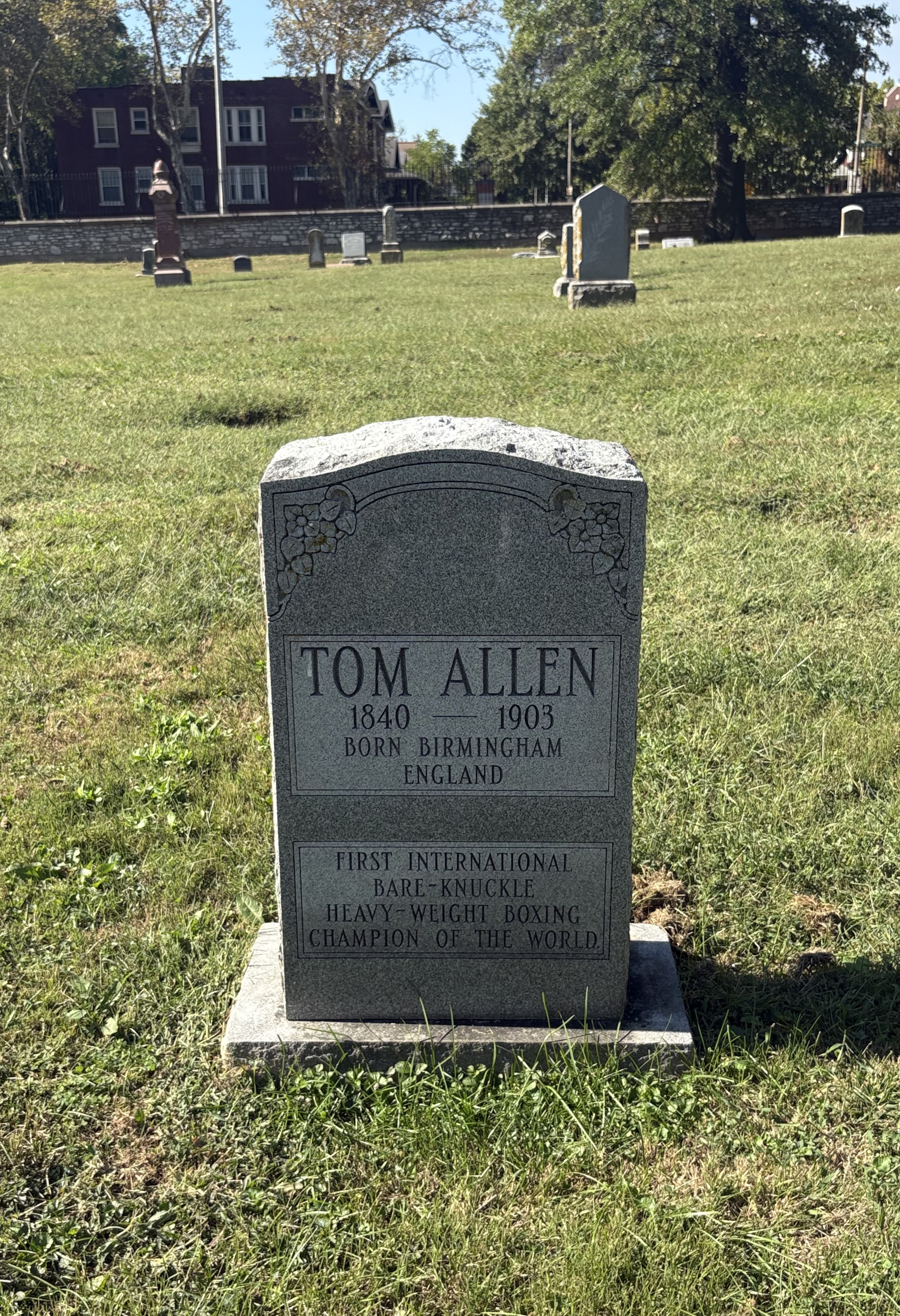
Allen's grave at Bellefontaine Cemetery

Allen was back in America by 1878, and in New York issued a challenge to fight the great John L. Sullivan, though the fight never took place. When he returned to the United States, his lawyer successfully argued for his release from the bond posted as a result of his arrest after his fight in Kentucky.

Between 1881–1886, Allen fought several exhibition fights which helped earn him income, but were not professional bouts. By around 1886, he had retired from all forms of boxing.

By 1899, Allen operated "Champion's Rest", a saloon on Market Street, in St. Louis. He was in custody on 27 February 1899 for the murder of a Tom Coupry four days earlier at his Saloon. Allen claimed self defense. Believing Coupry was about to shoot him, he pulled his revolver and fired first. Allen was eventually released on bond, and continued to operate his Saloon, the site of several crimes and assaults in the following years.

Allen died on 5 April 1903, at the Baptist Sanitarium in St. Louis, Missouri, at the age of 62, and was buried at St. Louis's Bellefontaine Cemetery. He had two weeks earlier announced his engagement to Tillie Hartgrave. There were various claimants to his estate including his 21 year old fiancée Tillie Hartgrave, though he clearly willed part of his estate to his daughter Mary Taylor and her sister, Mrs. J. H. Newey of Birmingham, England.

Awards and achievements
Preceded by Mike McCoole	World Heavyweight Bare-knuckle Boxing Champion; 23 September 1873 – 7 September 1876	Succeeded by Joe Goss
