= Arnold Haultain =

British writer

Theodore Arnold Haultain
- Born: 3 November 1857; Cannanore, India
- Died: 11 June 1941 (aged 83)
- Occupation: novelist
- Writing career
- Notable works: Hints for Lovers, Reminiscences, The Mystery of Golf, Two Country Walks in Canada

Theodore Arnold Haultain (1857–1941) was a British writer. He was for many years secretary to Goldwin Smith in Toronto, writing a memoir and acting as literary executor after his death. His book, "Hints for Lovers", was a limited edition, dedicated to his daughter Emma.

== Life ==
Haultain was born on 3 November 1857 in Cannanore, India. He was the son of Major Gen. Francis Mitchell Haultain and Isabella Thomas. He was for many years secretary to Goldwin Smith in Toronto, writing a memoir and acting as literary executor after his death.

He died on 11 June 1941 in Westmoreland at the age of 83.

== Works ==
During his life he published 36 books, on subjects ranging from "A history of Riel's second rebellion and how it was quelled" to "The mystery of golf". His book, "Hints for Lovers", was a limited edition, dedicated to his daughter Emma.

From The Writer, vol 21:

"Arnold Haultain, author of "The Mystery of Golf," published recently by Houghton Mifflin Company, was born in India, and is a son of the late Major-General Haultain, of the British army. Mr. Haultain was educated in England, and going to Canada while still young, took his degree at the University of Toronto. His first publication was a little critique of Cardinal Newman's theory of the Illative Sense as expounded in that famous prelate's "Grammar of Assent."

Since then Mr. Haultain has contributed to the Nineteenth Century, Blackwood's Magazine, the Westminster Review, the Monthly Review, Literature (published by The Times), Nature, and many other first-class periodicals. Two or three of his English articles have been copied into American magazines, notably "How to Read" (from Blackwood's Magazine), in Littell's Living Age, and his "Mayfair and the Nurses" (also from Blackwood's), in the Eclectic.

His first original contribution to American magazines was a long essay on "Walks and Walking Tours," printed in the Atlantic for October, 1903. In July, 1904 the Atlantic published a second essay, "The Mystery of Golf." This article was Mr. Haultain's second essay on the subject of golf, his first paper having appeared in the Contemporary Review for August, 1902, from which magazine it was copied in full in Littell's Living Age for the following month. Morang & Co., of Toronto, published an octavo illustrated volume by Mr, Haultain, entitled "Two Country Walks in Canada” "

== Family ==
Haultain married Amy Millicent Fraser, daughter of Alexander Fraser and Mary Mead Torrance, on 23 June 1886 in Detroit, Michigan. They had three children:

- Theodore Jones Arnold Haultain b. 5 Aug 1887, d. 28 Sep 1914
- John Arnold Minet Haultain b. 10 Nov 1896, d. 22 Apr 1898
- Emma Mellicent Audrey Haultain b. 8 Feb 1903, d. Nov 1993
