= Mike McCoole =

American boxer

Personal information
- Nicknames: Mike McCool; Frequent spelling in newspapers
- Nationality: (Republic of Ireland) Irish American (United States); Became American citizen
- Born: Michael McCoole; 12 March 1837 Bally Bulay, County Donegal, Ireland
- Died: 17 October 1886 (aged 49) New Orleans, Louisiana, U.S.
- Height: 6 ft 2 in (1.88 m); Height estimates vary slightly downward
- Weight: 180 lb (82 kg)-200 lb (91 kg)

Boxing career
- Stance: Orthodox; Right-handed; Used London Prize Ring Rules

Boxing record
- Total fights: 8 (major fights only)
- Wins: 6
- Draws: 2

Mike McCoole (12 March 1837 – 17 October 1886), sometimes spelled McCool, was an Irish-born bare-knuckle boxing champion who came to America at the age of thirteen. He claimed the Heavyweight Championship of America in 1866 by defeating boxer Bill Davis after former champion Joe Coburn retired, and lost the title to Tom Allen in 1873.

== Early life ==
McCoole was born on 12 March 1837 in Bally Bulay, County Donegal, Ireland, and came to America at the age of only 13, living first in New York, and then moving West, making a home first around Louisville, Kentucky and Cincinnati, Ohio. He worked on steam boats hauling freight on the Ohio and the Upper Mississippi, for most of his career.

McCoole's boxing style was not highly scientific and finessed but aided by his strength, size and a frequent hard right. He occasionally used throws against smaller opponents in the hope it would wear them down. His first recorded bout was in April, 1858 for a purse of $100 against Bill Nary, a well reputed prize fighter, in Louisville, Kentucky, which he won in seventeen minutes and eight rounds. At the age of 22, McCoole defeated William Blake on Twelve Mile Island in the Ohio off Louisville, Kentucky on 29 June 1859 in thirty-seven minutes, and 29 rounds. It was a difficult battle, and McCoole had his nose damaged and his eyes nearly closed. Tom Jennings, a larger man and desperate hitter, fell to McCoole for a $500 purse in his third match on 2 May 1861, in only thirty-three minutes in New Orleans, Louisiana, McCoole's future home.

== London Prize Ring rules ==
Under the English Broughton rules of prize fighting, used by McCoole, if a boxer went down and could not continue after 30 seconds, the fight ended. Hitting a downed fighter and grasping or hitting below the waist were prohibited. Broughton invented and encouraged the use of "mufflers", a form of padded gloves, which were used in training and exhibitions, but not prize fights. The advent of the Broughton rules around 1743 did allow fighters an advantage not enjoyed by modern boxers; a boxer could drop to one knee to start a 30-second count at any point in the match, but overuse of this privilege was frowned upon and sometimes disallowed by the judges.

By 1866, when McCoole began boxing in earnest, the Broughton Rules had evolved into the slightly more civilized London Prize Ring Rules promulgated in 1843. Fine scientific boxing with a calculated defense involving feints with the arms and forward foot were rarely a feature of bare-knuckle boxing in the 1860s, nor necessary with the undisciplined nature of London Prize Ring Rules. The rules also outlawed head butting, holding the ropes, strangling, using resin, stones or hard objects in the hands, and biting. Other than gouging, hitting a man when he was down, kicking, or hitting or grabbing below the waist, most moves were permitted, including throwing a man down or holding him to inflict blows.

McCoole first fought Joe Coburn for the American heavyweight championship and a purse of $2,000 on 5 May 1863 in Charlestown, Maryland, losing in 67 rounds and in a time of 1:10:00. The substantial crowd of 2,000 assembled about 30 feet from the shore of the North East River, a remote area, to elude police who may have stopped the fight. When compared to his opponent, McCoole was two years younger, around 20 pounds heavier, and had a height advantage of around three and a half inches. Coburn appeared from early in the fight to have the upper hand, but he was thrown heavily to the ground in the early rounds by his larger opponent, a move allowed under London Prize Ring Rules. Coburn appeared lighter on his feet than the heavier man, and with greater science dealt two blows to each one of McCoole's. McCoole continued to begin each round and absorb punishment. By the 67th, McCoole was badly injured and exhausted from loss of blood. When the fight was called at the end of the 68th, McCoole was said to be "frightfully bruised and disfigured".

== American heavyweight champion, 1866 ==
McCoole secured the heavyweight championship of America by defeating Bill Davis in 35 rounds and 34 minutes on 19 September 1866 at "Chouteau Island" in Madison County, Illinois. Joe Coburn had previously vacated the title in 1865 due to his retirement from boxing, allowing McCoole to fight for the title against Davis. Coburn later returned to the ring without the title. Taking place at 4 pm, there was a purse of $500, to be split by each contestant, and a championship belt containing gold and silver, at stake. McCoole dominated the bout, appearing to have a weight advantage of at least 15 pounds, and had the first knockdown in the first round. McCoole's greater weight made a difference as he fell upon Davis several times, and had a far heavier punch. In the brutal affair, Davis was down in both the thirty-second and thirty-third rounds. McCoole punched Davis, who was badly injured, "all over the ring" in the 35th when Davis's seconds threw up the sponge, ending the fight.

== Defense of the championship, 1867 ==
On 31 August 1867, McCoole successfully defended the championship against English-born Aaron Jones before an impressive 3,500 spectators near a railway station in a beautiful grove at Busenbark's Station, Ohio, winning in thirty-four rounds and twenty-six minutes. Jones was four years older at 35, an inch and a half shorter and before the fight, around eight pounds lighter than McCoole. In the brutal affair, Jones was knocked out in the 34th round, and was believed to have two broken ribs and a concussion. Jones was down in the thirty-second and thirty-third, possibly to end the rounds. Jones appeared to be "completely overwhelmed" by McCoole, and fought with little science or a studied defense. McCoole scored the final knockdown with a terrible right between the eyes of Jones, who was borne away by carriage a half hour later. McCoole's vanquished opponent had fought his last fight, and according to at least one source died several years later, partly from injuries to his lungs caused by his broken ribs in the match. In September 1867, McCoole scheduled three exhibitions with Adam Jones, but the outcome of these fights remain unknown.

McCoole scheduled a heavyweight championship fight with former champion Joe Coburn in Cold Spring Station, Indiana for 27 May 1868 which was cancelled when the police intervened and arrested both Coburn and his trainer, having previously arrested McCoole. Both boxers were imprisoned in Lawrenceburg, Indiana, but were released on July 3. The impressive purse was for $5,000 a side. McCoole had previously been briefly arrested in Cincinnati as a warning not to fight within the State of Ohio.

== Marriage, 1868 ==
A large crowd attended the church service as McCoole married a well bred and attractive local Irish girl, Mollie Norton, on August 9, 1868, in St. Louis, though the marriage was brief and troubled. With his championship winnings, he opened a popular Saloon in St. Louis, on the corner of Washington and Fifth Streets which he continued to operate through the early 1870s. The Saloon would be mentioned frequently in local papers for assaults, shootings, and thefts.

== Losing the championship, 1873 ==
On the day before his championship fight against Tom Allen in St. Louis, both boxers were arrested and required to post a bond of $1,000 to keep the peace. Nonetheless, the fight took place the following day on 23 September 1873 with a seventh round win by Allen at Chouteau Island in Madison County, Illinois. A crowd of around 2,000 assembled to watch the bout. Allen fought at 172 pounds, winning the bout despite a sixteen-pound weight disadvantage, and a three-inch disadvantage in height.

McCoole was considered by many historians to be the more awkward boxer, and took the fiercer punishment in the first three rounds, with Allen opening a cut on his right eye, which he continued to pound. By the fourth round, he was down for the first time, and a terrible site to behold. The fifth round saw Allen doling out additional punishment to McCoole, and in the final round Allen started off with several mighty blows to McCoole's face, soon ending the bout. McCoole had a terrible cut under his right eye with damage to his left as well, and what appeared to be a broken nose, and badly cut upper lip. Spectators begged McCoole's seconds to take him out of the ring, and they soon did. Allen took the bareknuckle heavyweight championship of America, in only twenty minutes of fighting. Allen had proven he was a superior boxer to McCoole and that what most perceived as his superior performance in their previous meeting, was genuine. He later called Allen, the "most magnificent tactician I had ever seen", and considered the bout, "the hardest of my life". The fight became the greatest loss of McCoole's career as the title, in the view of many current boxing historians, was a world and not merely American heavyweight championship.

== Charge of murder ==
On 30 October 1873, McCoole was arrested outside his Saloon in St. Louis on a charge of murdering a lightweight boxer named Patsy Manley, with whom he was said to have been quarreling with in his Saloon on Washington Street. Manley had received a gunshot wound to his left breast. McCoole was jailed for a period of time after his arrest, but was later acquitted on 17 February 1875 as the prosecution could not find the principle witnesses to testify. A sizable percentage of St. Louis residents still believed McCoole was guilty of the crime. Not long after his arrest, his brush with the law may have caused him to lose his Saloon in St. Louis from lack of patronage, and because he fell out of favor after his loss to Tom Allen. Allen operated a competing St. Louis saloon which saw more business after McCoole's loss. By 1879, McCoole had relocated to New Orleans, working for a period as a wharf laborer and on a Sugar Plantation.

As late as 1878, McCoole tried to set up a fight with Tom Kelly, but the fight never took place, as Kelly believed the $100 stake would not justify the time and effort it would take for him to complete his training.

== Work on the Mississippi ==
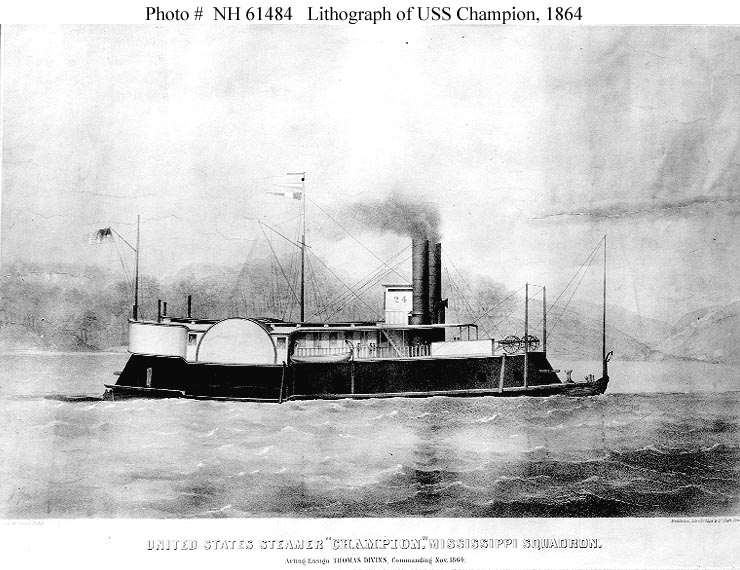
Steamer USS Champion

In his boxing retirement, McCoole continued to work as a wharf laborer and mate on steamboats, and worked occasionally on coal barges as well. He was aboard the steamboat Champion in 1864 when she was set on fire in Memphis during the Civil War. The Champion was hit by an incendiary device, starting a small fire. She returned to shore, while McCoole tied her up and waited for her crew and supplies to unload.

He was a mate on the stern wheel packet freighter Florence Meyer when she was snagged and sunk on the Mississippi while loaded with cotton and other supplies, about 12 miles above Natchez, Mississippi near Bullett's Bayou, Louisiana in the early morning of September 25, 1880. At least four of the crew were lost in the accident. McCoole did not drown, as several newspapers reported, though he was washed overboard as the ship was sinking. After a struggle, he was able to grab on to a barrel and pull himself back aboard using a guard rope to wait for rescue. He worked aboard the steamer Yazoo off Louisiana as late as 1881, and as a fireman, shoveling fuel to the boiler, on the Earle, a New Orleans harbor boat. In 1884, he worked as a fireman on the towboat Port Eads.

McCoole died in financial distress on 17 October 1886, at Charity Hospital in New Orleans, Louisiana, of malaria, and other diseases, and was buried at St. Patrick's Catholic Cemetery, near Canal Street.

Awards and achievements
Preceded by Joe Coburn– Vacated	World Heavyweight Bare-knuckle Boxing Champion; 19 September 1866–23 September 1873	Succeeded by Tom Allen
