= 1857 in sports =

1857 in sports describes the year's events in world sport.

== Baseball ==
National championship

- National Association of Base Ball Players champion – Brooklyn Atlantics
- In May, sixteen baseball clubs from modern New York City convene and revise the rules including replacement of 21 runs by 9 innings. The convention will be known as the first of the National Association of Base Ball Players although there is yet no annual commitment or formal organization.

== Boxing ==
Events

- John Morrissey retains the Championship of America but there is no record of any fights involving him in 1855.
- 10 February — Tom Sayers defeats Aaron Jones in the 85th round at Medway, Kent. Having beaten Harry Poulson the previous year, Sayers is now the main contender for the Championship of England title disputed by William Perry and Tom Paddock.
- 16 June — Sayers defeats Perry after 85 rounds at the Isle of Grain. Sayers claims the title but most backers still recognise Paddock, who does not fight this year. Perry's career ends after his defeat by Sayers.

== Cricket ==
Events

- The All-England Eleven (AEE) and the United England Eleven (UEE) begin an annual series of matches against each other that will continue until 1869. The fixture is the most important of the season while it lasts.
- James Grundy becomes the first player known to be given out handled the ball when playing for MCC v. Kent at Lord's.

England

- Most runs – William Caffyn 612 @ 18.00 (HS 90)
- Most wickets – William Caffyn 126 @ 9.09 (BB 9–29)

== Football ==
Events

- 24 October — foundation of Sheffield FC, the world's oldest known association football club (currently playing in the Northern Premier League).
- Foundation of Liverpool F.C., the rugby union club which is now part of Liverpool St Helens F.C. It will merge with St Helens RUFC in the 1980s but still claims to be the world's oldest "open" rugby football club.

== Horse racing ==
England

- Grand National – Emigrant
- 1,000 Guineas Stakes – Imperieuse
- 2,000 Guineas Stakes – Vedette
- The Derby – Blink Bonny
- The Oaks – Blink Bonny
- St. Leger Stakes – Imperieuse

== Rowing ==
The Boat Race

- 4 April — Oxford wins the 14th Oxford and Cambridge Boat Race
