= James Mansfield (golfer) =

Scottish golfer

Personal information
- Full name: James Lutyens Mansfield
- Nationality: Scotland
- Born: 6 September 1841 Edinburgh, Scotland
- Died: 20 December 1888 (aged 47) Edinburgh, Scotland

Career
- Sport: Golf
- Status: Amateur

Best results in major championships
- The Open Championship: T7: 1882

James Lutyens Mansfield (6 September 1841 – 20 December 1888) was a Scottish amateur golfer who played in the late 19th century. Mansfield tied for seventh place in the 1882 Open Championship.

== Early life and family ==
Mansfield was born in Edinburgh in 1841, the son of Thomas Mansfield and Mary Ann Henrietta Mansfield (née Lutyens). His sister, Marion Charlotte Mansfield, married James Adam Hunter and two of their children—Thomas Mansfield Hunter and Norman Frederick Hunter—were useful amateur golfers.

== Golf career ==
=== 1882 Open Championship ===
The 1882 Open Championship was the 22nd Open Championship, held 30 September at the Old Course at St Andrews, Fife, Scotland. Bob Ferguson won the Championship for the third successive time, by three strokes from Willie Fernie.

==== Details of play ====
Ferguson led after the morning round with an 83. Going out in 40 he started back 4-3-4 and with some steady play came back in 43, despite a six at the 16th. Fitz Boothby, a local amateur, scored 86 despite a couple of sevens in the closing holes. He shared second place with Jack Kirkaldy, Jamie Anderson, and Tom Kidd in 87.

Boothby scored 89 in the second round and took an early lead on 175. Anderson and Bob Martin, playing together, each had good rounds and they also both finished on 175. Ferguson again played steadily, going out in 42. Starting home he continued to score well and, despite a few sixes on his card, he avoided major disasters and finished with an 88 and a total of 171. The best of the later starters was Fernie. Despite starting with a six he was out in 40 and finished in 86 for a total of 174, good enough for second place.

Ferguson's win was his third in succession, once on each of the Championship courses, matching the achievement of Anderson from 1877 to 1879. His £12 first prize was a record for the Open at that time.

=== Amateur Championship ===
Mansfield played in the first Amateur Championship in 1885 and also in 1888. In 1885 he lost in the first round but In May 1888 at Prestwick he reached the quarter-finals before losing to the eventual winner John Ball 2 and 1.

== Schooling and career ==
Mansfield studied at Loretto School, Rugby School, and Cambridge University and became an advocate at the Scottish Bar in Edinburgh.

== Death ==
Mansfield was thrown from his horse on 18 December 1888 while riding in Edinburgh and died two days later.
