= Glenrothes and Mid Fife =

UK Parliament constituency (since 2005)

Coordinates: 56.197°N 3.173°W

- County constituency for the House of Commons
- Location of Glenrothes and Mid Fife within Scotland
- Subdivision: Fife
- Electorate: 69,734 (March 2020)
- Major settlements: Glenrothes, Levenmouth (part of), Lochgelly, Kelty and Cardenden

Current constituency
- Created: 2005 (as Glenrothes)
- Member of Parliament: Richard Baker (Scottish Labour)
- Created from: Central Fife

Glenrothes and Mid Fife (/ɡlɛnˈrɒθɪs/) is a constituency in Scotland in the House of Commons of the UK Parliament, represented by Richard Baker of the Labour Party since the 2024 general election. The seat was previously held by Peter Grant of the Scottish National Party (SNP). The seat includes the major settlements of Glenrothes, Levenmouth (part of), Lochgelly, Kelty and Cardenden.

It was created at the 2005 general election as Glenrothes, and renamed as Glenrothes and Mid Fife for the 2024 general election under the 2023 review of Westminster constituencies.

== Boundaries ==
Map of boundaries 2005–2024

Map of boundaries from 2024

2005–2024: Under the Fifth Review of UK Parliament constituencies, the constituency boundaries were defined in accordance with the ward structure in place on 30 November 2004 and contained the Fife Council wards of Cardenden, Cluny and Chapel; Kinglassie, Bowhill and Dundonald; Wemyss and Muiredge; Buckhaven and Denbeath; Methilhill; Methil; Leven West and Kirkland; Kennoway; Windygates, Star and Balgonie; Markinch and Woodside East; Auchmuty and Woodside West; Pitteuchar and Finglassie North; Thornton, Stenton and Finglassie South; Caskieberran and Rimbleton; Newcastle and Tanshall; South Parks and Macedonia; Leslie and Whinnyknowe; Balgeddie and Collydean; Cadham, Pitcoudie and Balfarg.

2024–present: Under the 2023 review of Westminster constituencies which came into effect for the 2024 general election, the renamed constituency contains the following wards or part wards of Fife Council:

- In full: Lochgelly, Cardenden and Benarty; Glenrothes West and Kinglassie; Glenrothes North, Leslie and Markinch; Glenrothes Central and Thornton; Buckhaven, Methil and Wemyss Villages.
- In part: Cowdenbeath (community of Kelty).

As a result of the boundary review, the communities of Lochgelly, Kelty and the Benarty area were added from the (renamed) Cowdenbeath and Kirkcaldy constituency. To compensate, Kennoway, Windygates and west Leven were transferred to North East Fife.

The revised 2024 boundaries of the constituency centre on Glenrothes and its surrounding villages; Coaltown of Balgonie, Leslie, Markinch, Milton of Balgonie and Thornton. Moving south and west to include Ballingry, Cardenden, Kelty, Kinglassie, Lochgelly and Lochore. In the east, the seat includes parts of the Levenmouth conurbation, including Buckhaven, Methil and the Wemyss villages; East Wemyss, West Wemyss, and Coaltown of Wemyss.

== History ==
Glenrothes was created for the 2005 general election, mostly replacing Central Fife, but incorporating small parts of Kirkcaldy and Dunfermline East.

=== Creation in 2005–2008 ===
The first holder of the newly created seat was John MacDougall, who died on 13 August 2008, triggering a by-election.

=== 2008 ===
In the 2008 by election, Lindsay Roy was elected, the Labour majority falling by around 4,000 votes, with the Labour vote increasing by 3%; the SNP making significant gains from the lower-placed Conservative and the Liberal Democrat candidates.

=== 2010 general election ===
With the 2010 general election, the Labour share of the vote increased by 10% at the expense of the SNP candidate. The winner's total reached 62% of the votes cast, which places the seat in the top decile of seats won and therefore indicates a safe seat majority. Relative to the 2005 general election the swing against the SNP was less accentuated than relative to the by-election at 4.45% of the vote on the standard two-party measure of swing, which is comparable to the national swing.

== Members of Parliament ==
Election	Member	Party
2005	John MacDougall	Labour
2008 by-election	Lindsay Roy	Labour
2015	Peter Grant	Scottish National Party
2024	Richard Baker	Labour

== Elections ==
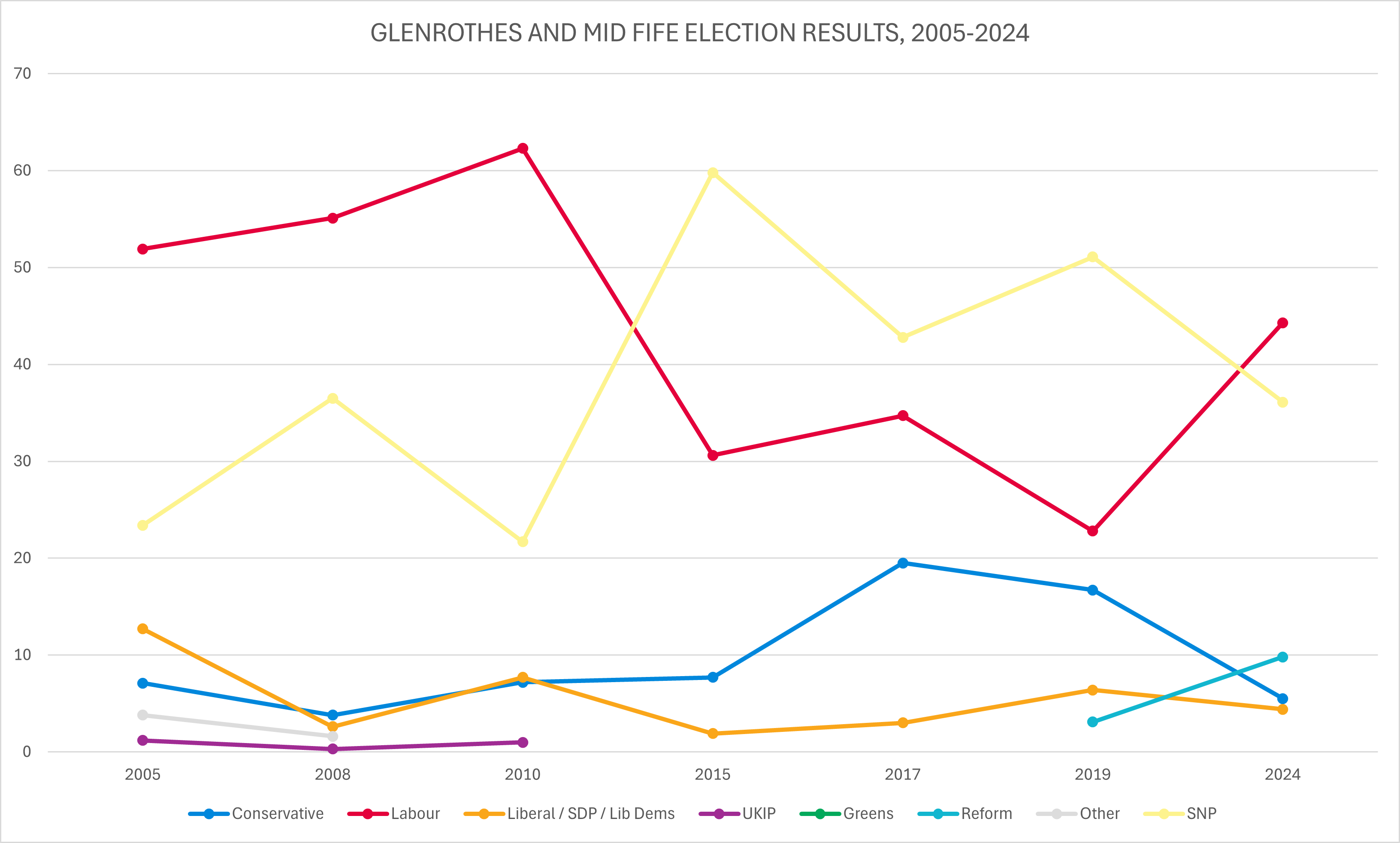
Election results 2005-2024

=== Elections in the 2020s ===
General election 2024: Glenrothes and Mid Fife
Party	Candidate	Votes	%	±%
Labour	Richard Baker	15,994	44.3	+16.9
SNP	John Beare	13,040	36.1	−13.4
Reform	Ian Smith	3,528	9.8	+6.8
Conservative	Debbie MacCallum	1,973	5.5	−9.8
Liberal Democrats	Jill Reilly	1,604	4.4	±0.0
Majority		2,954	8.2	N/A
Turnout		36,139	51.33	−9.5
Registered electors		70,655		
Labour gain from SNP		Swing	+15.1	

=== Elections in the 2010s ===
2019 notional result (Note: Estimate of the 2019 general election result as if the revised boundaries recommended under the 2023 boundary review were in place)
Party	Vote	%
SNP	20,921	49.5
Labour	11,569	27.4
Conservative	6,482	15.3
Liberal Democrats	1,876	4.4
Brexit Party	1,284	3.0
Scottish Greens	146	0.3
Majority	9,352	22.1
Turnout	42,278	60.6
Electorate	69,734	

General election 2019: Glenrothes
Party	Candidate	Votes	%	±%
SNP	Peter Grant	21,234	51.1	+8.3
Labour	Pat Egan	9,477	22.8	−11.9
Conservative	Amy Thomson	6,920	16.7	−2.8
Liberal Democrats	Jane Ann Liston	2,639	6.4	+3.4
Brexit Party	Victor Farrell	1,276	3.1	New
Majority		11,757	28.3	+20.2
Turnout		41,546	63.2	+2.3
SNP hold		Swing	+10.1	

The Brexit Party withdrew support for Victor Farrell over homophobic remarks.

General election 2017: Glenrothes
Party	Candidate	Votes	%	±%
SNP	Peter Grant	17,291	42.8	−17.0
Labour	Altany Craik	14,024	34.7	+4.1
Conservative	Andrew Brown	7,876	19.5	+11.8
Liberal Democrats	Rebecca Bell	1,208	3.0	+1.1
Majority		3,267	8.1	−21.1
Turnout		40,399	60.9	−7.3
SNP hold		Swing	−10.6	

General election 2015: Glenrothes
Party	Candidate	Votes	%	±%
SNP	Peter Grant	28,459	59.8	+38.1
Labour	Melanie Ward	14,562	30.6	−31.7
Conservative	Alex Stewart-Clark	3,685	7.7	+0.5
Liberal Democrats	Jane Ann Liston	892	1.9	−5.8
Majority		13,897	29.2	N/A
Turnout		47,598	68.2	+8.5
SNP gain from Labour		Swing	+35.0	

General election 2010: Glenrothes
Party	Candidate	Votes	%	±%
Labour	Lindsay Roy	25,247	62.3	+10.4
SNP	David Alexander	8,799	21.7	−1.7
Liberal Democrats	Harry Wills	3,108	7.7	−5.0
Conservative	Sheila Low	2,922	7.2	+0.1
UKIP	Kris Seunarine	425	1.0	−0.2
Majority		16,448	40.6	+12.1
Turnout		40,501	59.7	+3.5
Labour hold		Swing	+6.0	

=== Elections in the 2000s ===
2008 Glenrothes by-election
Party	Candidate	Votes	%	±%
Labour	Lindsay Roy	19,946	55.1	+3.2
SNP	Peter Grant	13,209	36.5	+13.1
Conservative	Maurice Golden	1,381	3.8	−3.3
Liberal Democrats	Harry Wills	947	2.6	−10.1
Scottish Senior Citizens	Jim Parker	296	0.8	−1.1
Scottish Socialist	Morag Balfour	212	0.6	−1.3
UKIP	Kris Seunarine	117	0.3	−0.9
Solidarity	Louise McLeary	87	0.2	New
Majority		6,737	18.6	−9.9
Turnout		36,195	52.4	−3.7
Labour hold		Swing	−4.96	

General election 2005: Glenrothes
Party	Candidate	Votes	%	±%
Labour	John MacDougall	19,395	51.9	−6.0
SNP	John Beare	8,731	23.4	−0.6
Liberal Democrats	Elizabeth Riches	4,728	12.7	+4.8
Conservative	Belinda Don	2,651	7.1	−0.4
Scottish Senior Citizens	George Rodger	716	1.9	New
Scottish Socialist	Morag Balfour	705	1.9	−0.8
UKIP	Paul Smith	440	1.2	+1.1
Majority		10,664	28.5	−5.4
Turnout		37,366	56.1	
Labour win (new seat)				
