= Jack Kirkaldy =

Scottish professional golfer (1858–1907)

Personal information
- Full name: John Kirkaldy
- Nickname: Jack
- Nationality: Scotland
- Born: 1858 St Andrews, Scotland
- Died: 10 November 1907 (aged 48-49) St Andrews, Scotland

Career
- Sport: Golf
- Status: Professional

Best results in major championships
- Masters Tournament: DNP
- PGA Championship: DNP
- U.S. Open: DNP
- The Open Championship: T3: 1882

John Kirkaldy (1858 – 10 November 1907) was a Scottish professional golfer who played in the late 19th century. Kirkaldy tied for third place in the 1882 Open Championship and placed eighth and T9 in the 1879 and 1884 Open Championships, respectively. His younger brothers Andrew and Hugh were also professional golfers.

== Early life ==
Born in St Andrews in 1858, Kirkaldy took naturally to golf as a boy. As a young professional he was posted at Alexandra Park in Glasgow for a time. He also worked in Cannes, France, where he was a noted instructor of golf. He favorite club was the cleek, and he sometimes played with only that club against competitors with a full complement of clubs.

== 1882 Open Championship ==
=== Details of play ===
The 1882 Open Championship was the 22nd Open Championship, held 30 September at the Old Course at St Andrews, Fife, Scotland. Bob Ferguson won the Championship for the third successive time, by three strokes from Willie Fernie. Kirkaldy had rounds of 86-89=175 and won £6 in prize money.

Ferguson led after the morning round with an 83. Going out in 40 he started back 4-3-4 and with some steady play came back in 43, despite a six at the 16th. Fitz Boothby, a local amateur, scored 86 despite a couple of sevens in the closing holes. He shared second place with Jack Kirkaldy with Jamie Anderson and Tom Kidd on 87. Boothby scored 89 in the second round and took an early lead on 175. Anderson and Bob Martin, playing together, each had good rounds and they also both finished on 175. Ferguson again played steadily, going out in 42. Starting home he continued to score well and, despite a few sixes on his card, he avoided major disasters and finished with an 88 and a total of 171. The best of the later starters was Fernie. Despite starting with a six he was out in 40 and finished in 86 for a total of 174, good enough for second place.

Ferguson's win was his third in succession, once on each of the Championship courses, matching the achievement of Anderson from 1877 to 1879. His £12 first prize was a record for the Open at that time.

== Death ==
Kirkaldy died on 10 November 1907 in St Andrews, Scotland.

== Results in The Open Championship ==
Tournament	1879	1880	1881	1882	1883	1884	1885	1886	1887	1888	1889
The Open Championship	T8			T3		T9	T11		T12	T18	

Tournament	1890	1891	1892	1893	1894	1895	1896	1897	1898	1899
The Open Championship		T14							T32	

Tournament	1900	1901	1902	1903	1904	1905	1906
The Open Championship	T19					CUT	CUT

Note: Kirkaldy played only in The Open Championship.

Top 10
Did not play

CUT = missed the half-way cut
"T" indicates a tie for a place

== Team appearances ==
- England–Scotland Professional Match (representing Scotland): 1905 (tie), 1906
