= James Mansfield (disambiguation) =

James Mansfield (1733–1821) was a British politician.

James Mansfield may also refer to:

- James Mansfield (Australian cricketer) (1860–1930), Australian cricketer
- James Mansfield (English cricketer) (1862–1932), English cricketer
- Jim Mansfield (1939–2014), Irish businessman and property owner
- James Mansfield (golfer) (1841–1888), Scottish amateur golfer
