= 1882 Open Championship =

Coordinates: 56.043°N 2.823°W

Tournament information
- Dates: 30 September 1882
- Location: St Andrews, Scotland
- Course: Old Course at St Andrews

Statistics
- Field: 40 players
- Prize fund: £45 15s
- Winner's share: £12

Champion
- (Scotland) Bob Ferguson
- 171

Location in Scotland

The 1882 Open Championship was the 22nd Open Championship, held 30 September at the Old Course at St Andrews, Fife, Scotland. Bob Ferguson won the Championship for the third successive time, by three strokes from Willie Fernie.

Ferguson led after the morning round with an 83. Going out in 40 he started back 4-3-4 and with some steady play came back in 43, despite a six at the 16th. Fitz Boothby, a local amateur, scored 86 despite a couple of sevens in the closing holes. He shared second place with Jack Kirkaldy with Jamie Anderson and Tom Kidd on 87.

Boothby scored 89 in the second round and took an early lead on 175. Anderson and Bob Martin, playing together, each had good rounds and they also both finished on 175. Ferguson again played steadily, going out in 42. Starting home he continued to score well and, despite a few sixes on his card, he avoided major disasters and finished with an 88 and a total of 171. The best of the later starters was Fernie. Despite starting with a six he was out in 40 and finished in 86 for a total of 174, good enough for second place.

Ferguson's win was his third in succession, once on each of the Championship courses, matching the achievement of Anderson from 1877 to 1879. His £12 first prize was a record for the Open at that time.

== Final leaderboard ==
Saturday, 30 September 1882

Place	Player	Score	Money
1	(Scotland) Bob Ferguson	83-88=171	£12
2	(Scotland) Willie Fernie	88-86=174	£9
T3	(Scotland) Jamie Anderson	87-88=175	£6
T3	(Scotland) Fitz Boothby (a)	86-89=175	−
T3	(Scotland) Jack Kirkaldy	86-89=175	£6
T3	(Scotland) Bob Martin	89-86=175	£6
T7	(Scotland) David Ayton Sr.	90-88=178	£2
T7	(Scotland) James Mansfield (a)	91-87=178	−
T7	(Scotland) Willie Park Sr.	89-89=178	£2
T7	(Scotland) James Rennie	90-88=178	£2

Tom Kidd took the last prize of 15s for finishing tied for 11th place with Henry Lamb, "as Mr Boothby, Mr Mansfield and Mr Lamb only played for the honour they retired from the list and allowed Kidd to get a place."

An additional prize of £1 10s was offered to the player with the lowest score for the final nine holes of the second round. This was shared by George Lowe, Bob Martin, Willie Park Sr. and Peter Fernie each scoring 44.
