= 2008 Glenrothes by-election =

UK parliamentary by-election

- 6 November 2008

Glenrothes parliamentary seat
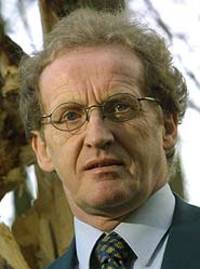

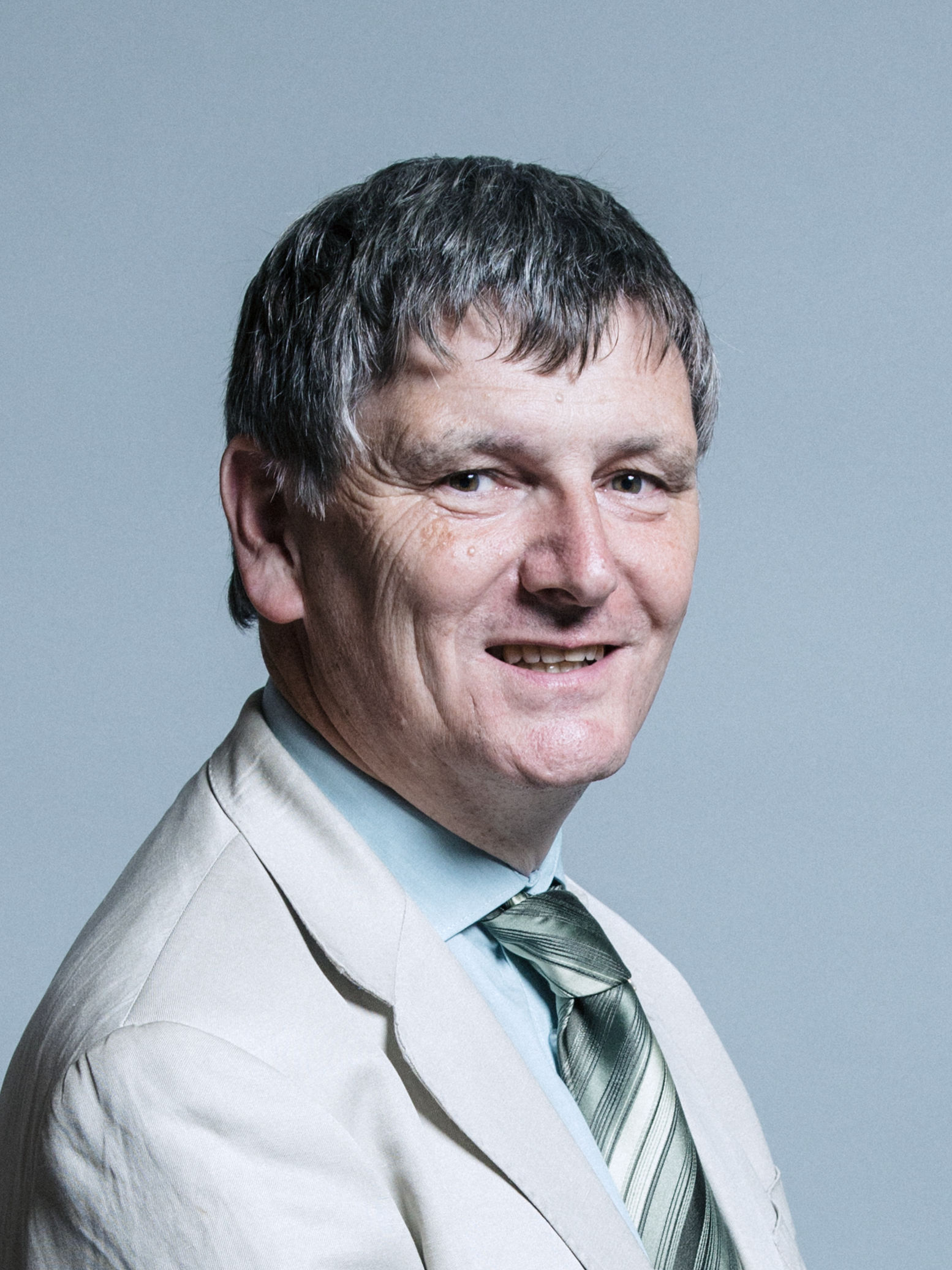
	First party	Second party
Candidate	Lindsay Roy	Peter Grant
Party	Labour	SNP
Popular vote	19,946	13,209
Percentage	55.1%	36.5%
Swing	▲3.2%	▲13.1%
MP before election
John MacDougall
Labour
Subsequent MP
Lindsay Roy
Labour

A by-election for the United Kingdom parliamentary constituency of Glenrothes was held on 6 November 2008, following the death of incumbent Labour Party MP John MacDougall. It was won by Lindsay Roy, who held the seat for Labour.

== Background ==
Fife is traditionally a stronghold for the Labour Party. MacDougall had held Glenrothes and its forerunner, Central Fife, since 2001, when he succeeded Henry McLeish. Willie Hamilton had previously represented the area, which has elected Labour MPs since Hamilton won West Fife from the Communist Party of Great Britain in 1950.

MacDougall died of pleural mesothelioma on 13 August 2008, aged 60. Pleural Mesothelioma is a rare form of lung cancer caused by prolonged exposure to asbestos.

The writ to trigger a by-election was moved on 7 October. By tradition, the polling date was decided by the vacating MP's party—Labour—and set for Thursday, 6 November.

Had the writ been moved immediately the by-election could have been held as early as mid-September, although this coincided with the Trades Union Congress annual conference and the following weeks were filled with various party conferences. A Labour loss during this period could have provided a particular boost for their opponents, or for dissident elements within the party. The SNP may have favoured a quick by-election, noting that Labour called the Glasgow East by-election rapidly, when commentators believed it was to Labour's advantage.

The poll followed a run of poor by-election results for the Labour Party, which included a loss to the Scottish National Party (SNP) in Glasgow East, formerly the party's twenty-fifth safest seat in Britain. Glenrothes has a considerably smaller Labour majority than Glasgow East had.

According to the Financial Times, Labour privately admitted that they expected to lose Glenrothes to the SNP. The Guardian described the constituency's main town, Glenrothes, as a "core area" for the SNP. The SNP were in second place in the seat in the 2005 general election and won the nearest equivalent seat in the 2007 Scottish Parliament election.

The SNP also ran Fife Council, which covers the constituency, in coalition with the Scottish Liberal Democrats. The Scottish Liberal Democrats won the last by-election to be held in Fife from Labour on a swing of 16%.

== Candidates ==
The Labour party candidate was Kirkcaldy High School rector Lindsay Roy. The SNP selected the leader of Fife Council, Peter Grant. The Conservative Party selected Maurice Golden while the Liberal Democrats chose Harry Wills. The Scottish Socialist Party stood Morag Balfour, their national co-chair, who lived in Glenrothes and had been a candidate in the constituency before. Solidarity stood Louise McLeary, a community activist who lived in the part of Kirkcaldy which lies inside the constituency. The UKIP candidate was Kris Seunarine a specialist in the science of biophotonics at Dundee university, and chairman of the Fife branch of UKIP.

Two of the minor party candidates had disabilities: Balfour was a wheelchair user and McLeary was visually impaired.

== Result ==
Glenrothes by-election, 2008
Party	Candidate	Votes	%	±%
Labour	Lindsay Roy	19,946	55.1	+3.2
SNP	Peter Grant	13,209	36.5	+13.1
Conservative	Maurice Golden	1,381	3.8	−3.3
Liberal Democrats	Harry Wills	947	2.6	−10.1
Scottish Senior Citizens	Jim Parker	296	0.8	−1.1
Scottish Socialist	Morag Balfour	212	0.6	−1.3
UKIP	Kris Seunarine	117	0.3	−0.9
Solidarity	Louise McLeary	87	0.2	New
Majority		6,737	18.61	−9.89
Turnout		36,195	52.37	−3.7
Labour hold		Swing	-4.96	

=== 2005 general election result ===
Glenrothes, 5 May 2005
Party	Candidate	Votes	%	±%
Labour	John MacDougall	19,395	51.9	−6.0
SNP	John Beare	8,731	23.4	−0.6
Liberal Democrats	Elizabeth Riches	4,728	12.7	+4.8
Conservative	Belinda Don	2,651	7.1	−0.4
Scottish Pensioners Party	George Rodger	716	1.9	New
Scottish Socialist	Morag Balfour	705	1.9	−0.8
UKIP	Paul Smith	440	1.2	+1.1
Majority		10,664	28.5	−5.4
Turnout		37,366	56.1	
Labour win (new seat)				

== Marked register ==
Some months after the election, the marked register (on which the electors who had cast their vote were marked) was discovered to be missing. In law the register ought to have been preserved for a year and a day; the Returning Officer from Fife Council had transmitted the marked register to the Sheriff Court as required by law and obtained a receipt. The SNP Constituency Organiser, Cllr John Beare, had asked for a copy of the marked register on 19 November 2008; after ten weeks, the Scottish Court Service admitted the marked register was lost. An inquiry by the Scottish Court Service identified significant failings in its handling of election documents, which had been placed in a room at the court office in Kirkcaldy to which outside contractors had access.

In October 2009, the Scotland Office agreed a protocol to create a substitute marked register for the election.
