= Henry Lamb (golfer) =

Scottish golfer

- Lamb, c. 1871

Personal information
- Full name: Henry Alexander Lamb
- Nationality: Scotland
- Born: 24 February 1844 India
- Died: 1 January 1893 (aged 48) Matlock, Derbyshire, England

Career
- Sport: Golf
- Status: Amateur

Best results in major championships
- Masters Tournament: DNP
- PGA Championship: DNP
- U.S. Open: DNP
- The Open Championship: 7th: 1876
- British Amateur: 2nd: 1886

Henry Alexander Lamb (24 February 1844 – 1 January 1893) was a Scottish amateur golfer who played in the late 19th century. He is most associated with Royal Wimbledon Golf Club. Lamb finished second in the 1886 Amateur Championship, losing 7 and 6 to Horace Hutchinson in the finals. He placed seventh in the 1876 Open Championship and finished in eight place in the 1873 Open Championship.

== Early life ==
Lamb was born in India on 24 February 1844. His father was posted in India where he worked for the East India Company.

== Golf career ==
=== The 1873 Open Championship ===
The 1873 Open Championship was the 13th Open Championship, held 4 October at the Old Course at St Andrews, Fife, Scotland. Tom Kidd won the Championship by a stroke from Jamie Anderson. This was the first Open Championship not held at Prestwick."

==== Details of playing conditions ====
In the days before the Championship heavy rains had soaked the course. However, when the first round got underway it was sunny with light winds—ideal conditions except for the wet turf. Under these adverse wet ground conditions Lamb was still able to get around the links in good fashion and played consistently, posting rounds of 96-96=192.

At this time in golf history there wasn't a specific rule in place to take free drops from casual water. The only option, other than playing the ball as it laid, was to drop (or tee up) a ball behind the hazard with a 1-stroke penalty. The winning score of 179 was the highest recorded while the Championship was over 36 holes. This was partly due to the fact that St Andrews was the toughest of the three courses used at that time for the Open and partly due to the difficult conditions. When the Open was next contested at St Andrews in 1876 the winning score was 176.

=== The 1876 Open Championship ===
In the 1876 Open Championship, held on 30 September at the Old Course at St Andrews, Fife, Scotland, Lamb finished in seventh place, carding rounds of 94-92=186.

=== The 1882 Open Championship ===
In the 1882 Open Championship, held 30 September at the Old Course at St Andrews, Fife, Scotland, Lamb finished in 11th place.

== Death and legacy ==
Lamb died on 1 January 1893 at Matlock, Derbyshire, England. He is best remembered as a frequent competitor in both the Open Championship and the Amateur Championship. In the latter event, he played extremely well finishing in second place in 1886. In the 1870s, Lamb had two top-10 finishes in the Open Championship.

Lamb is reputed to be the inventor of the "bulger" golf club, a wood with a convex face, circa 1885. In his 1890 book Golf, Horace Hutchinson advises that the theory behind the convex face is that shots hit on the heel will have less of a tendency to go to the right and shots struck nearer the toe will have a lesser tendency of traveling to the left of your target. Meanwhile, a shot struck in the sweet spot (center of the clubface) will be unaffected. All woods and metal woods of the modern era incorporate Lamb's invention.

== Results in major championships ==
| Tournament | 1873 | 1874 | 1875 | 1876 | 1877 | 1878 | 1879 | 1880 | 1881 | 1882 | 1883 | 1884 | 1885 | 1886 | 1887 | 1888 | 1889 | 1890 | 1891 |
|---|---|---|---|---|---|---|---|---|---|---|---|---|---|---|---|---|---|---|---|
| The Open Championship | 8 LA | | | 7 LA | | | T11 LA | | | T11 LA | | | | | | | | | WD |
| The Amateur Championship | NYF | | | | | | | | | | | | | 2 | R16 | | QF | R64 | R16 |

Note: Lamb played only in The Open Championship and The Amateur Championship.

Top 10
Did not play

LA = Low amateur
NYF = Tournament not yet founded
WD = Withdrew
"T" indicates a tie for a place
R64, R32, R16, QF, SF = Round in which player lost in match play

Sources for Amateur Championship: 1887, 1889, 1890, 1891
