= Walter Gourlay =

Scottish golfer

Personal information
- Nationality: Scotland
- Born: c. 1853 St Andrews, Fife, Scotland
- Died: September 1882 (aged 29) Dundee, Scotland

Career
- Sport: Golf
- Status: Professional

Best results in major championships
- Masters Tournament: DNP
- PGA Championship: DNP
- U.S. Open: DNP
- The Open Championship: 6th: 1873

Walter Gourlay (c. 1853 – September 1882) was a Scottish professional golfer. Gourlay placed sixth in the 1873 Open Championship and finished tied for eight place in the 1876 Open Championship.

== Early life ==
Gourlay was born in St Andrews, Scotland, circa 1853. The Gourlay family was well known for their club- and ball-making skills.

== Golf career ==
=== The 1873 Open Championship ===
The 1873 Open Championship was the 13th Open Championship, held 4 October at the Old Course at St Andrews, Fife, Scotland. Gourlay had rounds of 92-96=188 and finished in sixth place. Tom Kidd won the Championship by a stroke from Jamie Anderson. This was the first Open Championship not held at Prestwick.

==== Details of playing conditions ====
In the days before the Championship heavy rains had soaked the course. However, when the first round got underway it was sunny with light winds—ideal conditions except for the wet turf. Under these adverse wet ground conditions Gourlay was still able to post good scores.

At the time there wasn't a specific rule in place to take free drops from casual water. The only option, other than playing the ball as it lay, was to drop (or tee up) a ball behind the hazard with a 1-stroke penalty. The winning score of 179 was the highest recorded while the Championship was over 36 holes. This was partly due to the fact that St Andrews was the toughest of the three courses used at that time for the Open and partly due to the difficult conditions. When the Open was next contested at St Andrews in 1876 the winning score was 176.

=== The 1876 Open Championship ===
In the 1876 Open Championship, Gourlay finished tied for eighth place. He carded rounds of 98-89=187 tying with Bob Kirk and George Paxton.

== Results in major championships ==
Tournament	1873	1874	1875	1876	1877	1878	1879
The Open Championship	6			T8			T20

Note: Gourlay played only in The Open Championship.

Top 10
Did not play

"T" indicates a tie for a place

== Death ==
A body was found on the beach at Dundee between 9 and 10 am on 13 September 1882, having been left behind by the receding tide. Later in the day the body was identified as Walter Gourlay, "a caddie belonging to St Andrews".
