= Peter Grant (politician) =

Scottish politician

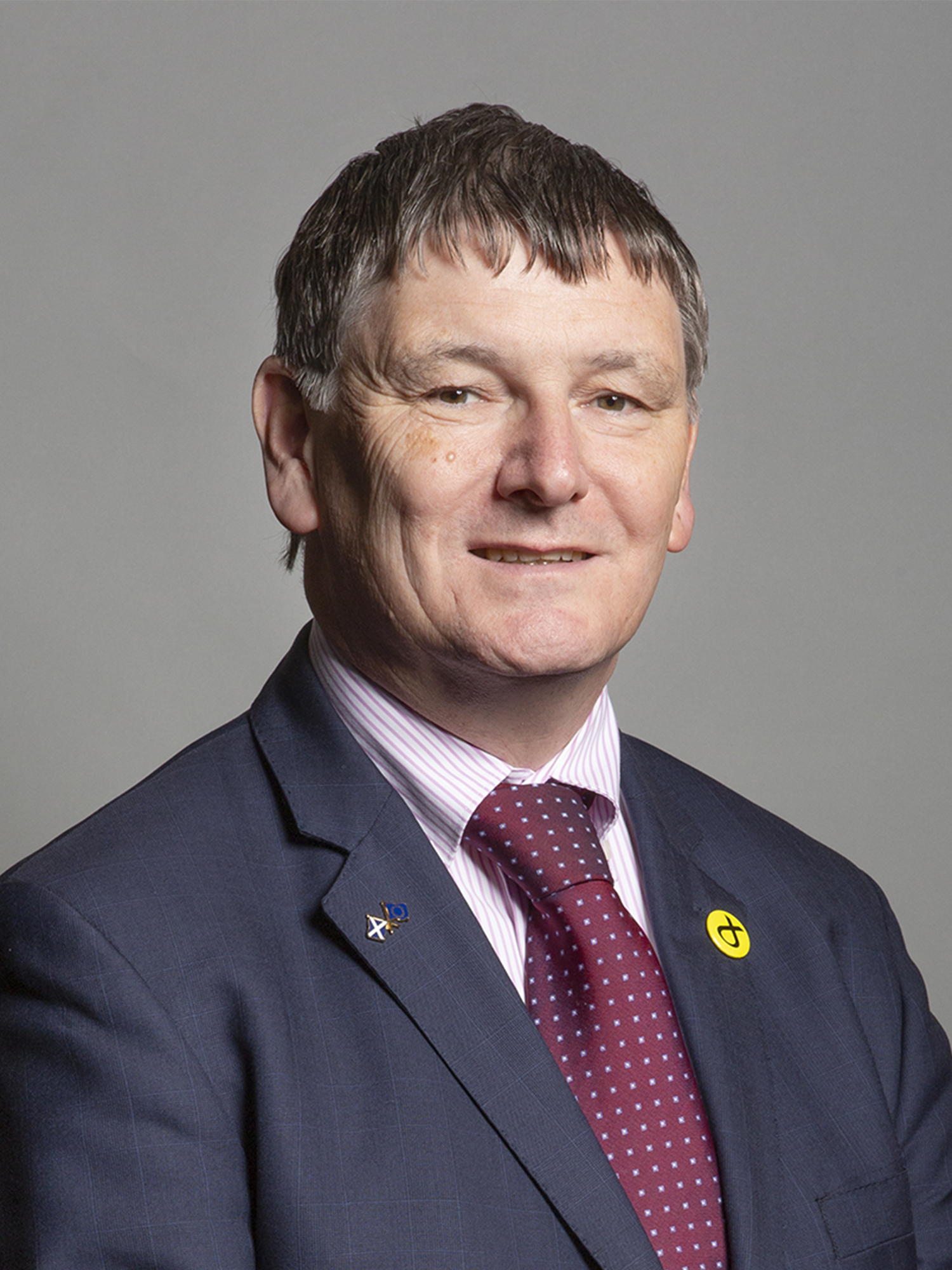

Member of Parliament for Glenrothes
- In office 7 May 2015 – 30 May 2024
- Preceded by: Lindsay Roy
- Succeeded by: Richard Baker

Personal details
- Born: 12 October 1960 (age 66) Coatbridge, Scotland
- Party: Scottish National Party (since 1987)
- Spouse: Fiona Grant (1985–present)

Peter Grant (born 12 October 1960) is a Scottish politician who served as the Member of Parliament (MP) for Glenrothes from 2015 to 2024. He is a member of the Scottish National Party (SNP).

== Early life ==
Peter Grant was raised in Lanarkshire and moved to Glenrothes in 1983. He married Fiona who later served as a Scottish National Party councillor. He joined the Scottish National Party in 1987.

== Political career ==
=== Early politics ===
Grant served on the council in Fife from the Glenrothes and Kinglassie ward from 1992 to 2015. During his tenure on the council he served as leader of the Fife Council from 2007 to 2012, with a coalition between the Scottish National Party and the Liberal Democrats. In 2015, he left the council so that he could focus on his campaign for a seat in the House of Commons of the United Kingdom.

=== EU Referendum ===
During a speech in Parliament on Monday 5 September 2016, Peter Grant equated campaigners for leaving the European Union, to the extreme right, when he said "The referendum was provoked by the desire of the then Prime Minister to fend off a challenge from the extreme right—not only the extreme right in the Conservative party, but those who were too extreme for his party—rather than facing down the xenophobes who wanted to demonise immigration and hold immigrants responsible for all the ills in our society."

=== House of Commons ===
==== Elections ====
Member of Parliament John MacDougall died in 2008, causing a by-election to be held in the Glenrothes constituency. Grant was selected to serve as the Scottish National Party's candidate, being the first candidate nominated by a party in the by-election, and was defeated by Labour nominee Lindsay Roy. Alex Salmond, the leader of the Scottish National Party, stated that he was at fault for the party's defeat in the by-election.

Grant was the Scottish National Party's candidate in the 2015 general election and defeated Labour nominee Melanie Ward, and Conservative nominee Alex Stewart-Clark. He was re-elected in the 2017 general election against Labour nominee Altany Craik and Conservative nominee Andrew Brown. He was re-elected in the 2019 general election against Labour nominee Pat Egan, Conservative nominee Amy Thomson, and Liberal Democrats nominee Jane Ann Liston.

==== Tenure ====
Grant served as the Scottish National Party Spokesperson for Exiting the European Union from 20 June 2017 to 7 January 2020, until he was replaced by Philippa Whitford. He has served as the Assistant Spokesperson for the Treasury since 7 January 2020.

He announced in June 2023 that he would stand down at the 2024 general election.

== Political positions ==
In July 2021, Grant apologised for a post on Twitter he made stating that "You're more right than you care to admit. Murdering babies wasn't on the Nazi manifesto." Marie van der Zyl, president of the Board of Deputies of British Jews, stated that "We are disturbed by the suggestion from some MPs that Nazism only gradually revealed its true aims."

Grant supported Nicola Sturgeon's condemnation of transphobia.

== Electoral history ==
2008 Glenrothes by-election
Party	Candidate	Votes	%	±%
Labour	Lindsay Roy	19,946	55.11%	+3.20%
SNP	Peter Grant	13,209	36.49%	+13.12%
Conservative	Maurice Golden	1,381	3.82%	−3.27%
Liberal Democrats	Harry Wills	947	2.62%	−10.03%
Scottish Senior Citizens	Jim Parker	296	0.82%	+0.82%
Scottish Socialist	Morag Balfour	212	0.59%	−1.30%
UKIP	Kris Seunarine	117	0.32%	−0.86%
Solidarity	Louise McLeary	87	0.24%	+0.24%
Total votes		36,195	100.00%	

2015 general election in Glenrothes election
Party	Candidate	Votes	%	±%
SNP	Peter Grant	28,459	59.79%	+38.06%
Labour	Melanie Ward	14,562	30.59%	−31.75%
Conservative	Alex Stewart-Clark	3,685	7.74%	+0.53%
Liberal Democrats	Jane Ann Liston	892	1.87%	−5.80%
Total votes		47,598	100.00%	

2017 general election in Glenrothes election
Party	Candidate	Votes	%	±%
SNP	Peter Grant (incumbent)	17,291	42.80%	−16.99%
Labour	Altany Craik	14,024	34.71%	+4.12%
Conservative	Andrew Brown	7,876	19.50%	+11.76%
Liberal Democrats	Rebecca Bell	1,208	2.99%	+1.12%
Total votes		40,399	100.00%	

2019 general election in Glenrothes election
Party	Candidate	Votes	%	±%
SNP	Peter Grant (incumbent)	21,234	51.11%	+8.31%
Labour	Pat Egan	9,477	22.81%	−10.90%
Conservative	Amy Thomson	6,920	16.66%	−2.84%
Liberal Democrats	Jane Ann Liston	2,639	6.35%	+3.36%
Brexit Party	Victor Farrell	1,276	3.07%	+3.07%
Total votes		41,546	100.00%	

Parliament of the United Kingdom
Preceded by Lindsay Roy	Member of Parliament for Glenrothes; 2015–2024	Succeeded by Richard Baker
