= Ned Cosgrove =

Scottish golfer

Personal information
- Full name: Edward Cosgrove
- Nickname: Ned
- Nationality: Scotland
- Born: July 1819 Inveresk, Scotland
- Died: Unknown

Career
- Sport: Golf
- Status: Professional

Best results in major championships
- Masters Tournament: DNP
- PGA Championship: DNP
- U.S. Open: DNP
- The Open Championship: 3rd: 1880, 1881

Edward Cosgrove (born July 1819) was a Scottish professional golfer who played in the late 19th century. Cosgrove had two strong finishes in the Open Championship, both third place, in the 1880 Open Championship and again in the 1881 Open Championship. Bob Ferguson was the winner of both the 1880 and 1881 Open Championships.

== Early life ==
Cosgrove was born in Inveresk, Scotland, in July 1819. the son of Edward Cosgrove, a general laborer, and his wife Ann Fechnie. Cosgrove worked as a caddie on Musselburgh links during the summer and returned to general labor in the winter months. His cousin, William Cosgrove, was also a professional golfer. Ned also had a younger brother, Robert, who was also a very fine player.

== Golf career ==
Cosgrove had two excellent results in the Open Championship. He had third-place finishes in both the 1880 Open Championship and the 1881 Open Championship.

== Death and legacy ==
Cosgrove's date of death is unknown. He is best remembered for having two third-place finishes in the Open Championship.

== Results in The Open Championship ==
Tournament	1880	1881
The Open Championship	3	3

Note: Cosgrove played only in The Open Championship.

DNP = Did not play
"T" indicates a tie for a place
Yellow background for top-10
