= Fitz Boothby =

Scottish golfer

Personal information
- Full name: George James Fitz-Robert Boothby
- Nationality: Scotland
- Born: 1861 Scotland
- Died: 26 September 1889 (aged 27–28) Queenscliff, Victoria, Australia

Career
- Sport: Golf
- Status: Amateur

Best results in major championships
- Masters Tournament: DNP
- PGA Championship: DNP
- U.S. Open: DNP
- The Open Championship: T3: 1882

George James Fitz-Robert Boothby (1861 – 26 September 1889) was a Scottish amateur golfer who played in the late 19th century. Boothby tied for third place in the 1882 Open Championship.

== Early life ==
Boothby was born in 1861 in Scotland, the son of Robert Tod Boothby. His younger brother was Robert Tuite Boothby, the father of Baron Boothby. His sister Edith Cunningham Boothby was the second wife of Walter Cunliffe, 1st Baron Cunliffe.

His father played in the 1876 Open Championship while his brother Robert played a number of times from 1885 to 1900. He had a son, Eric FitzGeorge Boothby (1887–1919), who played four times in the Amateur Championship between 1907 and 1914.

== Golf career ==
=== 1882 Open Championship ===
The 1882 Open Championship was held 30 September at the Old Course at St Andrews, Fife, Scotland. Boothby shot rounds of 86-89=175 and finished in third place. Scottish professional Bob Ferguson won the Championship for the third successive time, by three strokes from Willie Fernie.

==== Details of play ====
Ferguson led after the morning round with an 83. Going out in 40 he started back 4-3-4 and with some steady play came back in 43, despite a six at the 16th. Boothby, a local amateur, scored 86 despite a couple of sevens in the closing holes. He shared second place with Jack Kirkaldy with Jamie Anderson and Tom Kidd on 87.

Boothby scored 89 in the second round and took an early lead on 175. Anderson and Bob Martin, playing together, each had good rounds and they also both finished on 175. Ferguson again played steadily, going out in 42. Starting home he continued to score well and, despite a few sixes on his card, he avoided major disasters and finished with an 88 and a total of 171. The best of the later starters was Fernie. Despite starting with a six he was out in 40 and finished in 86 for a total of 174, good enough for second place.

Ferguson's win was his third in succession, once on each of the Championship courses, matching the achievement of Anderson from 1877 to 1879. His £12 first prize was a record for the Open at that time.

== Australia ==
Boothby married Mary McCrea at St Peter's, Eastern Hill, Melbourne in 1884. He had come to Australia in 1884 and later joined the Victorian Artillery as a lieutenant in April 1885 and was promoted to captain in July 1889.

== Death ==
Boothby died on 26 September 1889 in Queenscliff, Victoria, Australia. He died of acute inflammation of the lungs. Mary Boothby was also seriously ill at the time of Boothby's death but recovered and died in St Andrews on 20 June 1933.
