= Glastian =

Saint Glastian of Kinglassie
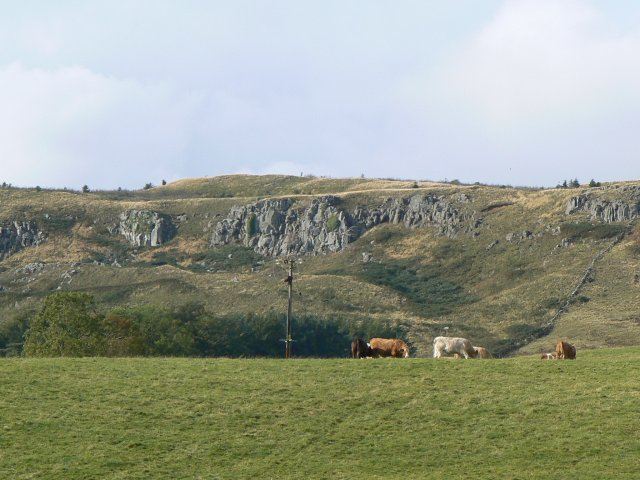
- Fife landscape near Kinglassie
- Born: Scotland
- Died: 830; Kinglassie, Fife
- Canonized: Pre-congregation
- Feast: 28 January
- Patronage: Kinglassie, Fife, Scotland

Saint Glastian of Kinglassie (or Glastianus, Glascianus; died 830) was a bishop based in Fife who acted as a mediator in the wars between the Picts and the invading Scots. His feast day is 28 January.

== Heritage ==
The church in Kinglassie, which belonged to Dunfermline Abbey, was dedicated to Saint Glastian. It was near to St. Glastian's Well. It is quite possible that the surname M'Glashan comes from Glastian.

== Monks of Ramsgate account ==
The monks of St Augustine's Abbey, Ramsgate wrote in their Book of Saints (1921),

Glastianus (St.) Bp. (Jan. 28)
(9th cent.) The Patron Saint of Kinglassie in Fife. As mediator between the Picts and Scots, he did much to alleviate the lot of the former when subjugated by their enemies. He died A.D. 830.

== Forbes's account ==
Alexander Penrose Forbes (1817–1875) in his Kalendars of Scottish Saints wrote,

GLASCIANUS, B. January 30.—Of the life of the saint we have no details. The collect in the Breviary runs in these terms :—

"Grant, we beseech Thee, Almighty God, that we, who celebrate the anniversary of blessed Glascianus, Thy confessor and bishop, may, by the inter-cession of his devout prayers, be deemed meet to attain to eternal joys, through our Lord."

He is known in the parish of Kinglassie (or Kinglassin), near Kirkcaldy, of which frequent mention is made in the Register of Dunfermline.—(Bannatyne Club, pp. 56, 57, 59, 69, 64,66, 81, 172, 175, 207, 418.) "Some trace" the name "from a saint whose name was Glass, and point out a well of fine water called S. Glass's well."—(O.S.A. iv. p. 501; N.S.A., Fife, 194.)

The other name of the parish of Strachur—i.e. Kilmaglas, or Kilmalosh, —points to a dedication to this saint in Argyleshire.—(Orig. Par. ii. 77.)

== Butler's account ==
The hagiographer Alban Butler (1710–1773) wrote in his Lives of the Fathers, Martyrs, and Other Principal Saints under January 28,

St. Glastian, Bishop and Confessor in Scotland

HE was a native of the county of Fife, and discharged in the same, during many years, the duties of the episcopal character with which he was honoured. Amidst the desolation which was spread over the whole country, in the last bloody civil war between the Scots and Picts, in which the latter were entirely subdued, St. Glastian was the comforter, spiritual father, and most charitable protector of many thousands of both nations. He died in 830, at Kinglace in Fifeshire, and was particularly honoured in that country, and in Kyntire. According to the ancient custom of that country, his name is frequently written Mac-Glastian, the word Mac signifying son. See the Breviary of Aberdeen; King in his Calendar, &c.

== Sources ==
- Butler, Alban (1868), The Lives of the Fathers, Martyrs, and Other Principal Saints, vol. I, Dublin: J. Duffy This article incorporates text from this source, which is in the public domain.
- Forbes, Alexander Penrose (1872), Kalendars of Scottish Saints: With Personal Notices of Those of Alba, Laudonia, & Strathclyde : an Attempt to Fix the Districts of Their Several Missions and the Churches where They Were Chiefly Had in Remembrance, Edmonston and Douglas This article incorporates text from this source, which is in the public domain.
- M'Kerlie, Peter Handyside (1879), History of the lands and their owners in Galloway, W. Paterson
- Scott, Hew (1950), Fasti ecclesiae scoticanae, vol. 1–8, Рипол Классик, ISBN 9785882268847
- St. Augustine's Abbey, Ramsgate (1921), The Book of saints : a dictionary of servants of God canonized by the Catholic Church, London: A. & C. Black, ltd. This article incorporates text from this source, which is in the public domain.
