= Lindsay Roy =

British politician (born 1949)

Lindsay Roy CBE FRSA
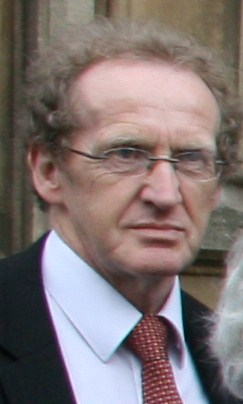

Member of Parliament for Glenrothes
- In office 6 November 2008 – 30 March 2015
- Preceded by: John MacDougall
- Succeeded by: Peter Grant

Personal details
- Born: 19 January 1949 (age 77)
- Party: Labour

Lindsay Allan Roy, CBE, FRSA (born 19 January 1949) is a British Labour Party politician, who was the Member of Parliament (MP) for Glenrothes from 2008 until 2015. He is the former Rector of Inverkeithing High School and Kirkcaldy High School. He announced he would be standing down as an MP in 2015 after being diagnosed with Parkinson's disease.

== Teaching career ==
Roy was educated at the University of Edinburgh where he was awarded a Bachelor of Science degree in 1970. He then trained as a teacher and became principal teacher of Modern Studies at Queen Anne High School Dunfermline in 1974. He was promoted to be Assistant Rector of Kirkcaldy High School in 1983, but left after three years to be Depute Rector of Glenwood High School in Glenrothes.

Starting in 1990, Roy became Rector of Inverkeithing High School, being awarded with a CBE for his work there in 2004. He served also as an Associate Assessor for HM Inspectorate of Education from 1996, and was appointed Chairman of the Curriculum and Student Affairs Committee of Carnegie College in 1997. Becoming active in The Headmaster's Association of Scotland, he was appointed as its president for the year 2004–05.

He became Rector of Kirkcaldy High School in 2008, the High School that former Prime Minister Gordon Brown had attended as a boy.

== Parliamentary career ==
=== 2008 by-election ===
Roy was chosen by the local Labour Party to fight the Parliamentary constituency of Glenrothes, following the death of local MP John MacDougall.

Following the victory at a by-election of the Scottish National Party in the parliamentary constituency of Glasgow East earlier that year, despite Fife not having a history of such spectacular landslide swings to the SNP in the past as in the West of Scotland, it had been expected that Labour would lose the by-election; however, the Labour Party held the seat, increasing their total vote slightly, albeit with a reduced majority.

Roy was subsequently a member of the Scottish Affairs Select Committee.

=== 2010 general election ===
At the 2010 election he polled 25,247 votes, 62.3% of the votes cast, an increase of 10.4%, easily securing re-election.

== Notes and references ==
Parliament of the United Kingdom
Preceded by John MacDougall	Member of Parliament for Glenrothes; 2008–2015	Succeeded by Peter Grant
