= Peter Paxton =

Scottish golfer (1857–1929)

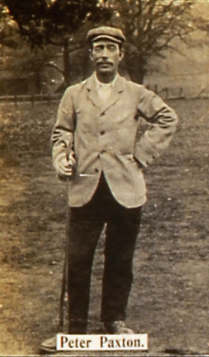
- Paxton, c. 1892

Personal information
- Nationality: Scotland
- Born: 20 October 1857 Musselburgh, Scotland
- Died: 3 July 1929 (aged 71) Romford, Essex, England
- Spouse: Sarah Hobley
- Children: 2

Career
- Sport: Golf
- Turned professional: c. 1876

Best results in major championships
- Masters Tournament: DNP
- PGA Championship: DNP
- U.S. Open: DNP
- The Open Championship: 2nd: 1880

Peter Paxton (20 October 1857 – 3 July 1929) was a Scottish professional golfer who played in the late 19th century. Paxton had three top-10 finishes in the Open Championship. He took second place in the 1880 Open Championship five shots behind winner Bob Ferguson. Paxton was an expert club and ball maker. His golf ball inventions included the Bramble and Sirdar models, the former being the ball of choice for Harry Vardon at one time. Paxton was also the designer of a number of golf courses, with Coventry Golf Club (Coventry, England) and East Berkshire Golf Club (East Berkshire, England) being among those designs.

== Early life ==
Paxton was born in Musselburgh, Scotland, on 20 October 1857. Peter was born to James Paxton, a cab driver, and his wife Elizabeth Sharp. In September 1881 he married Sarah Hobley at Upton-upon-Severn, Worcestershire, England. They had two children, George and Elizabeth. His older brother George was also a professional golfer.

== Golf career ==
=== 1880 Open Championship ===
The 1880 Open Championship was held 9 April at Musselburgh Links, Musselburgh, East Lothian, Scotland. Bob Ferguson won the Championship by five strokes from runner-up Paxton who carded rounds of 81-86=167.

=== 1883 Open Championship ===
In the 1883 Open Championship, again held at Musselburgh Links, he was tied for tenth place. Bob Ferguson dominated play from 1880-82 by winning three Open Championships in a row. Paxton shots rounds of 46-39-39-43=167.

=== 1885 Open Championship ===
The 1885 Open Championship was the 25th Open Championship, held 3 October at the Old Course at St Andrews, Fife, Scotland. Bob Martin won the Championship for the second time, by one stroke from Archie Simpson. Paxton fired rounds of 85-91=176, finishing in eighth place, and won £1 in prize money.

=== Match vs. Albert Tingey, Sr. ===
Paxton met Albert Tingey, Sr. in a memorable match on 27 October 1900 on a windy and wet day at Tooting Bec Golf Club in south London. Paxton, playing on his home links, was likely the betting favorite, although his results going in were not equal with Tingey who in October 1899 had halved against Harry Vardon at Watford and had been playing better golf in the short term. Heavy rain the day before had soaked the course making approach shots and putting difficult. Playing in stiff winds, the first 27 holes were stubbornly contested to a draw, but Tingey pulled away in the end winning 4 and 3.

=== Club maker ===
Paxton was an expert club and ball maker, his clubs being highly desirable in his day and beyond. Not unlike other golfers of his era, he began as a caddie at Musselburgh. He apprenticed as a club maker under David Park, the brother of Willie Park, Sr. In addition to the tutelage he received under David Park, he also picked up a few useful skills when he later apprenticed under Tom Hood. He took a job as the professional from his brother John at Malvern’s Worcestershire Club and was later posted at Royal Eastbourne.

Paxton exhibited considerable inventiveness when in 1892 he created a machine that would produce several thousand gutta-percha golf balls weekly. He received patents on a type of grip and also for square socketed clubs. Some of his clubs were made from an unusual type of hardwood that he called “sylviac”, but it could possibly have been itauba.

He left Royal Eastbourne in 1893—with several skilled club makers joining him—and took up a new post at Tooting Bec. By this time, he had gained the royal patronage of the Duke and Duchess of York and therefore placed a crown mark on the clubs he made.

Balls, clubs and other items made by Paxton were displayed on the golf stall at the Sports and Pastimes Exhibition at the Crystal Palace in 1893.

== Later life and death ==
Paxton was professional at Old Colwyn Golf Club from 1910 before moving to Oakwood Park Hotel, Conway.

Paxton died in Romford, Essex, on 3 July 1929.

== Results in The Open Championship ==
Paxton in about 1885 hitting a shot

Tournament	1877	1878	1879
The Open Championship	?	13	T20

Tournament	1880	1881	1882	1883	1884	1885	1886	1887	1888	1889
The Open Championship	2	DNP	DNP	T10	DNP	8	23	DNP	DNP	?

Tournament	1890	1891	1892	1893	1894	1895	1896	1897	1898	1899
The Open Championship	DNP	T41	DNP	DNP	WD	DNP	30	T51	T21	CUT

Tournament	1900	1901	1902	1903
The Open Championship	T19	CUT	CUT	CUT

Note: Paxton played only in The Open Championship.

DNP = Did not play
WD = Withdrew
? = Finish unknown
CUT = missed the half-way cut
"T" indicates a tie for a place
Yellow background for top-10
