= 1873 Open Championship =

Coordinates: 56.043°N 2.823°W

Tournament information
- Dates: 4 October 1873
- Location: St Andrews, Scotland
- Course: Old Course at St Andrews

Statistics
- Field: 27 players
- Prize fund: £25
- Winner's share: £11

Champion
- (Scotland) Tom Kidd
- 179

Location in Scotland

The 1873 Open Championship was the 13th Open Championship, held 4 October at the Old Course at St Andrews, Fife, Scotland. Tom Kidd won the Championship by a stroke from Jamie Anderson. This was the first Open Championship not held at Prestwick. The Championship was still contested over 36 holes; now two rounds of 18 holes rather than three rounds of 12. Since the new "Champion Trophy" (commonly known as the Claret Jug) was not ready in 1872, Kidd became the first golfer to receive it at the Championship. "The trophy conferred on the successful golfer is a silver cup which, however, can never become the absolute property of any winner (as was the case with the champion belt which fell to Young Tom Morris, who won it three times in succession). Along with the honour the winner receives a medal and likewise a money prize."

In the days before the Championship the rain had fallen incessantly, leaving the course very wet. Although the day of the Championship itself was sunny with little wind, the course remained very heavy with several parts being pools of water. Under the rules at the time there was no concept of "casual water". The only option, other that playing it, was that "if the ball is in water, the player may take it out, change the ball if he pleases, tee it, and play from behind the hazard, losing a stroke." It was reported that "the play as a whole was indifferent, but this may be partly accounted for by the state of the green." The winning score of 179 was the highest recorded while the Championship was over 36 holes. This was partly because St Andrews was the toughest of the three courses used and partly due to the difficult conditions. The next time the Open (in 1876) was at St Andrews the winning score was 176.

The best score in the first round was 91 by Jamie Anderson, Tom Kidd and Bob Kirk. A number of the players scored over 100. Three players beat 90 in the second round, the best being 88 by Tom Kidd, who won the Championship by a stroke from Jamie Anderson who scored 89. The favourites were Tom Morris Jr. and Davie Strath. Defending champion Morris scored a second round 89 but his first round of 94 left him out of contention. Strath had a first round 97 that also left him too far behind. Henry Lamb from Royal Wimbledon Golf Club was the leading amateur, finishing in 8th place.

== Final leaderboard ==
Saturday, 4 October 1873

Place	Player	Score	Money
1	(Scotland) Tom Kidd	91-88=179	£11
2	(Scotland) Jamie Anderson	91-89=180	
T3	(Scotland) Bob Kirk	91-92=183	
T3	(Scotland) Young Tom Morris	94-89=183	
5	(Scotland) Davie Strath	97-90=187	
6	(Scotland) Walter Gourlay	92-96=188	
7	(Scotland) Tom Morris Sr.	93-96=189	
8	(England) Henry Lamb (a)	96-96=192	
T9	(Scotland) Willie Fernie	101-93=194	
T9	(Scotland) Bob Martin	97-97=194	

Those in second to sixth places also received prize money. Kirk and Tom Morris Jr. shared the third and fourth place money.
