= 1881 Open Championship =

Coordinates: 56.043°N 2.823°W

Tournament information
- Dates: 14 October 1881
- Location: Prestwick, South Ayrshire, Scotland
- Course: Prestwick Golf Club

Statistics
- Field: 22 players
- Prize fund: £21
- Winner's share: £8

Champion
- (Scotland) Bob Ferguson
- 170

Location in Scotland

The 1881 Open Championship was the 21st Open Championship, held 14 October at Prestwick Golf Club in Prestwick, South Ayrshire, Scotland. Bob Ferguson won the Championship for the second successive year, by three strokes from runner-up Jamie Anderson.

The weather was terrible, taking place on the same day as the Eyemouth disaster, where over 100 fishermen died. Play was delayed an hour for the weather to improve but it actually got worse and eventually started at 11:30.

The 1st hole proved to be particularly challenging. At 578 yards it was a long hole by the standards of the time, although Tom Morris Jr. had holed his third shot in his opening round of the 1870 Open Championship. Ferguson was in the first group and started with an eight. In his three tries at the hole that day he took a total of 25 (8-9-8) but lost nothing on his nearest challenger Anderson who also took 25 (8-10-7). The scores of the other players is unrecorded.

Ferguson played an excellent first round, scoring 53 (8-4-4-6-4-5-3-3-6-3-3-4). This was four strokes better than anyone else. He scored 60 in his second round and Willie Campbell with a 56 reduced the lead to three, with Anderson four behind.

Campbell had a poor final round of 65 and Jamie Anderson was Ferguson's only challenger. Ferguson played a steady final round of 57 and although Anderson had a good last round, Ferguson won by a clear three strokes.

== Final leaderboard ==
Friday, 14 October 1881

| Place | Player | Score | Money |
|---|---|---|---|
| 1 | (Scotland) Bob Ferguson | 53-60-57=170 | £8 |
| 2 | (Scotland) Jamie Anderson | 57-60-56=173 | £5 |
| 3 | (Scotland) Ned Cosgrove | 61-59-57=177 | £3 |
| 4 | (Scotland) Bob Martin | 57-62-59=178 | £2 |
| T5 | (Scotland) Willie Campbell | 60-56-65=181 | £1 |
| T5 | (Scotland) Tom Morris Sr. | 58-65-58=181 | £1 |
| T5 | (Scotland) Willie Park Jr. | 66-57-58=181 | £1 |
| 8 | (Scotland) Willie Fernie | 65-62-56=183 | |

The scores of the other finishers is not recorded.
