= 1880 Open Championship =

Coordinates: 55.948°N 3.044°W

Tournament information
- Dates: 9 April 1880
- Location: Musselburgh, East Lothian, Scotland
- Course: Musselburgh Links

Statistics
- Field: 30 players
- Prize fund: Not known
- Winner's share: £8

Champion
- (Scotland) Bob Ferguson
- 162

Location in Scotland

The 1880 Open Championship was the 20th Open Championship, held 9 April 1880 at Musselburgh Links, Musselburgh, East Lothian, Scotland. Bob Ferguson won the Championship, by five strokes from runner-up Peter Paxton.

A number of players were absent because of the short notice given for the competition. Jamie Anderson, winner of the previous three Open Championships was amongst those that were missing. Good weather brought out many spectators. The Championship was played over four rounds of the nine-hole Musselburgh course.

Andrew Kirkaldy scored a hole-in-one at the eighth hole in his second round and almost repeated the feat in his third round.

After three rounds Bob Ferguson was tied for the lead with Peter Paxton with Ned Cosgrove only a shot behind. In the final round Ferguson scored 39 to Paxton's and Cosgrove's 44s to win by five strokes.

== Final leaderboard ==
Friday, 9 April 1880

Place	Player	Score	Money
1	(Scotland) Bob Ferguson	40-41-42-39=162	£8
2	(Scotland) Peter Paxton	81-86=167	
3	(Scotland) Ned Cosgrove	82-86=168	
T4	(Scotland) David Brown	86-83=169	
T4	(Scotland) George Paxton	85-84=169	
T4	(Scotland) Bob Pringle	90-79=169	
7	(Scotland) Andrew Kirkaldy	85-85=170	
T8	(Scotland) Willie Brown	87-84=171	
T8	(Scotland) Davie Grant	87-84=171	
10	(Scotland) Tom Morris Sr.	87-88=175	

Generally scores relate to first 18 holes and second 18 holes. Individual round scores mostly not recorded.
