= Milton of Balgonie =

Village in Fife, Scotland

Coordinates: 56.194°N 3.096°W

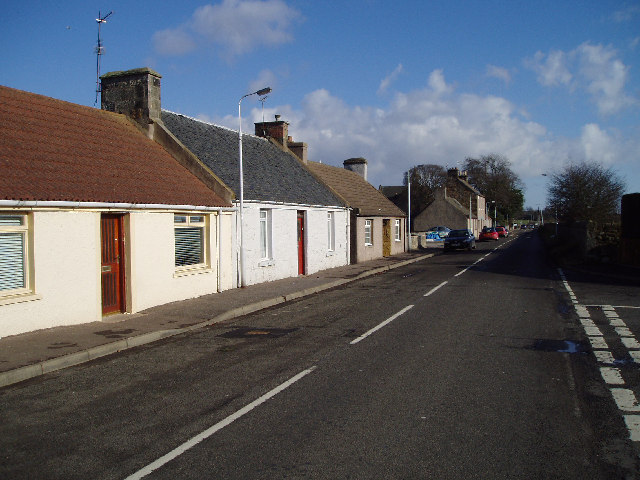

Milton of Balgonie is a small village in central Fife, Scotland. It is situated 2 miles (3.2 km) east of Glenrothes between the nearby villages of Markinch and Coaltown of Balgonie to the west and Windygates to the east. Nearby attractions include Balgonie Castle which is situated between Milton and Coaltown. The ruins of Balfour House, where Mary, Queen of Scots sometimes resided, are to the south of the village.

The village has been home to a number of industries through the ages, from flax, flour and wood mills, and to coal mining, although none now remain active: the sawmill being the last standing, but already partially redeveloped.

The coal mine was situated at the west end and was the 'ingaun ee' type: a mine accessible by walking into rather than a vertical shaft. There is little remaining apart from a bricked up entrance in the wall opposite Castle View, some concrete stairs, and the sloped mound of the entrance in the field behind.

An extended family in the Milton were McCluskie with daughters Lavinia, Mary & Betha & sons Wull, Aund - their father was a coal miner and would regale locals with the tale of cycling to work very early in the day when he would ride into a dip in the road, known as a "Will 'o the Wisp" - descending into a shroud of a mist and suddenly very cold to emerge at the other end teeth chattering!

== Sources ==
- The Gazetteer for Scotland
