= Willie Thomson =

Scottish golfer

Personal information
- Nationality: Scotland
- Born: c. 1851 Scotland

Career
- Sport: Golf
- Status: Professional

Best results in major championships
- Masters Tournament: DNP
- PGA Championship: DNP
- U.S. Open: DNP
- The Open Championship: T4: 1876

Willie Thomson (born c. 1851) was a Scottish professional golfer who played during the late 19th century.

== Early life ==
Thomson was born in Scotland c. 1851. He was born into what was called the "famous Thomson golfing dynasty." That extended family included: Ben Sayers, a brother-in-law and famous club and ball maker and the winner of 24 professional golf tournaments; Davie Grant, a brother-in-law and famous golf ball maker who played in 10 Open championships; Jack White, a brother-in-law and the 1910 Open Champion and long time head pro at the Sunningdale Golf Club in London; George Thomson, a nephew and a head pro at numerous UK clubs and the first professional at the Longniddry Golf Club in Scotland; Wilfred Thomson, a brother and the head professional at a number of UK and US golf clubs including The Country Club of Virginia Jimmy Thomson, a nephew and PGA Tour professional who won two PGA events.

== Golf career ==
In total, Thomson had three top-10 finishes in The Open Championship. In the 1874 Open Championship and 1889 Open Championship he finished tied for sixth and tenth, respectively. His best performance came in the 1876 Open Championship where he finished tied for fourth place.

Thomson was appointed head professional at the Huntingdon Valley Country Club in Philadelphia in 1899. He was the club's third head pro. Thomson left Huntingdon Valley in 1903 to become the head professional at the Riverton Country Club in Riverton, New Jersey and later at Plymouth Country Club just north of Philadelphia before moving to the Congress Lake Golf Club in Hartsville, Ohio.

== Death ==
Thomson's place and date of death are unknown.

== Results in The Open Championship ==
Tournament	1874	1875	1876	1877	1878	1879	1880	1881	1882	1883	1884	1885	1886	1887	1888	1889
The Open Championship	T6		T4	?			T22		T16	23						T10

Note: Thomson played only in The Open Championship.

Top 10
Did not play

? = played, finish unknown
"T" indicates a tie for a place
