= Thornton, Fife =

Coordinates: 56.164°N 3.148°W

Thornton: Scots: Thorntoun
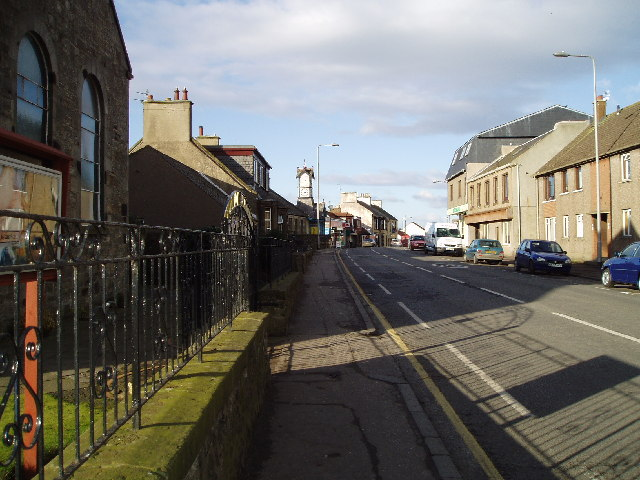
- Main Street, Thornton

- Location within Fife
- Population: 2,040 (2020)
- OS grid reference: NT288974
- Council area: Fife
- Lieutenancy area: Fife
- Country: Scotland
- Sovereign state: United Kingdom
- Post town: KIRKCALDY
- Postcode district: KY1
- Dialling code: 01592
- Police: Scotland
- Fire: Scottish
- Ambulance: Scottish
- UK Parliament: Glenrothes
- Scottish Parliament: Mid Fife and Glenrothes

Thornton (Scots: Thorntoun) is a village in Fife, Scotland. It is between Kirkcaldy and Glenrothes, and stands between the River Ore and Lochty Burn, which are at opposite ends of the main street. The Church of Scotland parish church was built in 1835 and is located on the Main Street.

== Community Council ==
Thornton has an active community council. Thornton Community Council meet on the first Monday of the month in Thornton Bowling Club. These meetings are open to any member of the public with local residents specifically encouraged to attend. Ward Councillors from Fife Council also attend as ex-officio members of the community council along with representatives from Police Scotland's Community Policing Team to discuss local issues.

== Transport ==
The village has a small railway station, which is called Glenrothes with Thornton. Although situated at the south end of Thornton, it also serves the Glenrothes area. This rail halt was opened in May 1992, restoring a rail service to Thornton lost when its main line railway station closed in October 1969 as a consequence of the 1963 report by Dr Richard Beeching on the Reshaping of British Railways (the Beeching Report). The railway station name is misleading as Thornton is not part of Glenrothes, whose town centre is 3 1/2 miles (5.5 kilometres) from the station, resulting in travellers bound for Glenrothes alighting in Thornton thinking they have reached their final destination.

The village is well served by local buses, operated by Stagecoach Group in Fife and running between Kirkcaldy and Glenrothes. However, express services providing travel further afield bypass Thornton.

== Railways ==
Thornton Junction railway station was opened in the 1840s on the Edinburgh and Northern Railway. During the first part of the twentieth century, Thornton Junction railway station was situated on the Aberdeen to London main line to the east of the village, at the end of Station Road. To the west, alongside the Dunfermline line, the largest railway marshalling yard in Scotland was built during the 1950s. Though much reduced, this yard is still in use for rail freight services.

== Coal mining ==
In 1957, the Rothes Pit was opened to mine the coal in the rural hinterland surrounding the village. This coal mine was tied very closely to the development of the postwar new town of Glenrothes to the north. The planned long-term benefits were to be huge, and were to be the driver for economic regeneration in Central Fife. In 1961, four years after opening, the huge investment was written off and the mine run down because of unstemmable flooding, and closed in May 1962. Ironically, miners who had worked in older deep pits in the area had forewarned against the development of the Rothes Pit for this very reason. The state-of-the art engineering and design was closed, leaving the huge enclosed concrete wheel-towers standing at Thornton for many years as a forlorn symbol of the collapse until 1993, when the towers were demolished.

== Sport ==
The village is home to the football club Thornton Hibs who compete in the East of Scotland League Premier Division and play at Memorial Park.

In season 2007–08, Thornton Hibs reached the semi-finals of the Scottish Junior Cup, only to be beaten 3-0 by Cumnock after extra time; the Hibs had been reduced to ten men, losing their goalkeeper, in the 89th minute when the score was 0-0.

The village also has its own 18-hole golf course and bowling club.

== Culture ==
The village used to hold a Highland Games annually every July. The event is not currently held as the organising committee have become inactive.

Thornton is also the birthplace of Sir George Sharp, a Labour politician who led the battle against local government reforms in the 1970s.

== Other ==
Thornton has a small (5-megawatt) solar farm.

== See also ==
Other villages on peripheries of Glenrothes:

- Coaltown of Balgonie (east)
- Kinglassie (south-west)
- Leslie (north-west)
- Markinch (north-east)
