= Richard Baker (Scottish politician) =

Scottish politician (born 1974)

Richard Baker MP
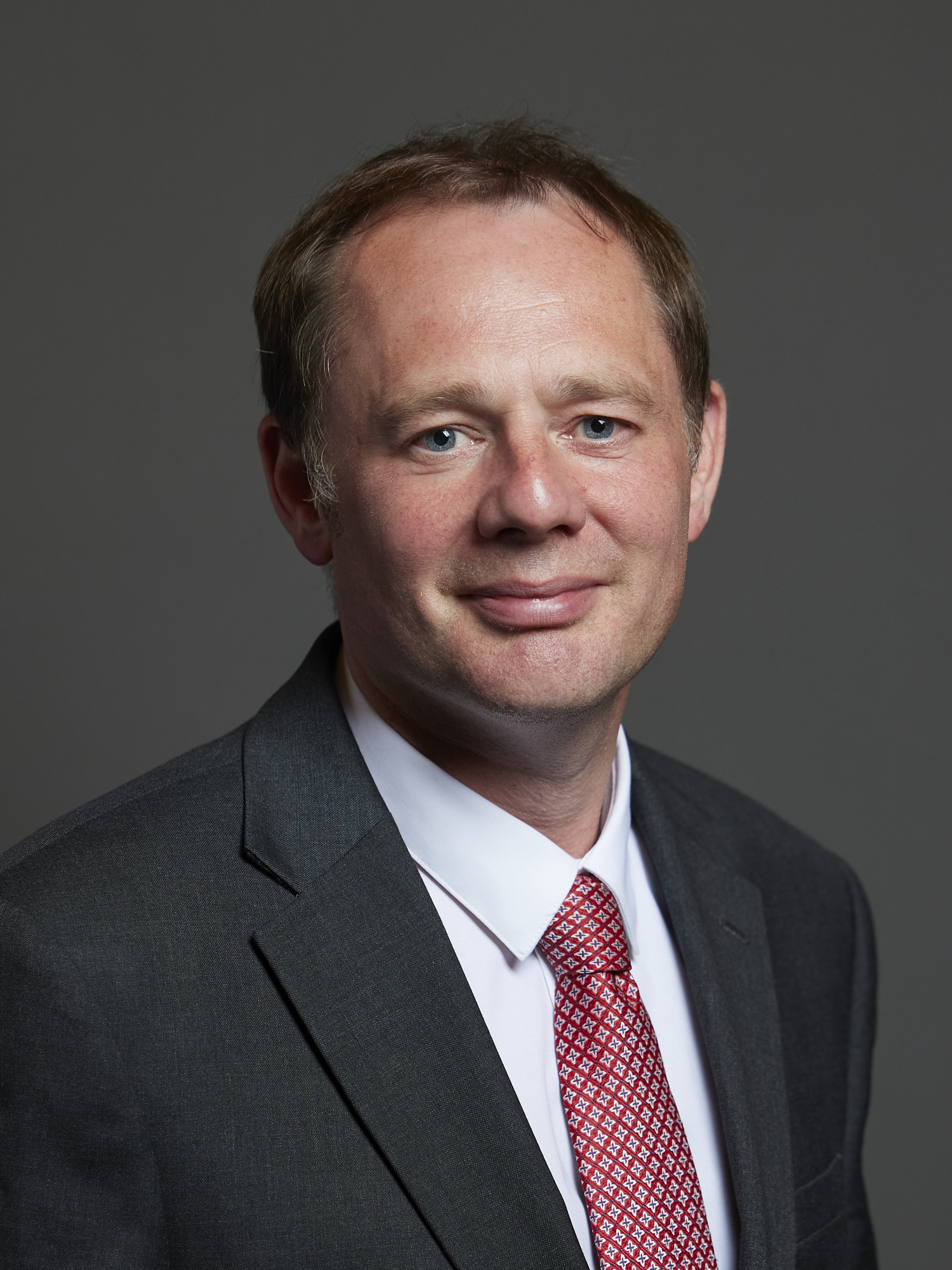
- Official portrait, 2024

Member of Parliament for Glenrothes and Mid Fife
- Incumbent
- Assumed office 4 July 2024
- Preceded by: Peter Grant
- Majority: 2,954 (8.17%)

Member of Scottish Parliament for North East Scotland
- In office 1 May 2003 – 11 January 2016
- Succeeded by: Lesley Brennan

Personal details
- Born: Richard James Baker; 29 May 1974 (age 52) Edinburgh, Scotland
- Party: Labour
- Spouse: Claire Brennan (m. 2004)
- Education: University of Aberdeen

Richard James Baker (born 29 May 1974) is a Scottish Labour politician who has served as the Member of Parliament for Glenrothes and Mid Fife since 2024. Baker was previously a member of the Scottish Parliament (MSP) for the North East Scotland region.

== Early life ==
Baker was born in Edinburgh to an Episcopalian priest father and English teacher mother, and is godson to the then Episcopalian Bishop of Aberdeen, Bruce Cameron. He was educated at the independent St. Bees School in Cumbria and at Aberdeen University. He was the elected president of the National Union of Students Scotland from 1998 till 2000 and before that the senior vice-president (an elected, full-time sabbatical officer post) at the University of Aberdeen students' representative council (now Aberdeen University Students' Association) in the academic year 1995/96. He is a former Scottish press officer of Help the Aged. Baker is a member of Unite the Union and the Co-operative Party.

== Political career ==
He was first elected in the 2003 Scottish Parliament election, when he was the youngest sitting MSP. He is a former member of Labour's Shadow Cabinet in the Scottish Parliament having served as the Shadow Cabinet Secretary for Justice and Shadow Cabinet Secretary for Finance.

In the early part of 2014, he was selected as the Labour candidate for Aberdeen North in the 2015 UK general election, after current MP Frank Doran announced his retirement. However, he lost in the election to Scottish National Party candidate Kirsty Blackman.

In June 2015, Baker announced he would stand in the 2015 Scottish Labour Party deputy leadership election. When the result was announced, he had come third of the three candidates in a close contest with 30% of the vote.

In September 2015, Baker announced he would be stepping down from the parliament at the 2016 election. He instead stood down early in January 2016 to take up a job with Age Scotland. As a list MSP, his seat was taken up by the next person on the Labour list for the North East Scotland region, Lesley Brennan.

In July 2024 he was elected Member of Parliament for the new constituency of Glenrothes and Mid Fife in the United Kingdom general election.

It was reported in August 2024 by The National that Baker was also a landlord and rented out four apartments, based on the parliamentary register of financial interests.

In May 2026, Baker joined a large number of Labour politicians in calling on leader Keir Starmer to resign. Baker praised Starmer for his work and progress, but was quoted in Fife Today as saying: "it is clear to me that too many people no longer believe he offers our country the leadership it needs". Baker asked Starmer to set a date for his departure.

== Personal life ==
Baker married Claire Brennan in 2004, with whom he has a daughter. Claire has served as a Member of the Scottish Parliament since 2007.
