= Markinch Curling Club =

UK curling club

Markinch Curling Club is a curling club in Markinch, Scotland that was instituted in 1842.

== Membership ==
Its members were formerly composed largely of employees of John Haig, the whisky blend whose bottling plant and offices used to be situated in Markinch, workers for Tullis Russell, a paper-mill on the banks of the nearby River Leven - in fact, Mr. Tullis was one of the founding members in 1842 - and a mixture of farmers and local Health Service professionals. With the closure of John Haig, one source of members was stopped; however, the club survives.

== Venues ==
Curling is known to have taken place in Markinch on "The Common", an area in the centre of the town now used as the car park for Markinch Bowling Club, Markinch Town Hall, Markinch Primary School, and the local library, prior to the Club’s founding but there is little known about this. The Club possesses a complete set of hand written minutes from the inaugural meeting to the present day.

There have been three curling ponds in the Club’s history. The first, opened in the winter of 1842, was on the North edge of the town on "the low lying ground at the foot of Archibald’s Park". It was only played on for five years. It had to be closed in 1847 when the North British Railway Company’s line to Cupar was built over the site. The Club received £15 in compensation. The second pond at Balfarg farm on Balbirnie estate was the most successful of the Club’s ponds, being played on during the great days of outdoor curling in the cold winters in the latter half of the 19th century. It was opened in 1850 with a match against Stratheden and curled on every winter for 64 years. This pond was the venue for club games, district medals and inter club challenge matches. A fine stone curling house was built with three rooms, the Laird’s room (the Laird being Mr. Balfour, of Balbirnie House), the west room and the curling stone room. However, in 1914, the club was again forced to move as the coming of electricity to Balfarg farm saw the mill lade drained and the source of water for the curling pond lost. A site for a new rink was found on "the common" in Markinch town itself, and it was opened on 6 January 1914, thus formalising the arrangements which had taken place before the Club's foundation. The days of outdoor curling were beginning to draw to an end, and the opening of Haymarket Ice Rink in 1912 confirmed that outdoor curling was becoming less popular. This rink eventually closed in 1938, bringing to an end 96 years of outdoor curling in Markinch.

Club games are now played at Kirkcaldy Ice Rink and at Kinross Curling Rink, the ice rink which was previously the property of the Green Hotel, Kinross, but which has been refurbished, and is now run, by Kinross Curling Trust.

== Competitions ==
The Club's main internal competition is the Balbirnie League, contested between the constituent rinks, which are named after historic Markinch place-names, Balgonie, Stob Cross, Dalginch, and Sweetbank. The Club's annual fixture with Glenrothes Curling Club is for the Davie Napier Trophy An annual game for the Mounie Trophy against Meldrum & Daviot Curling Club means that the Club may also play at Forfar Ice Arena, Curl Aberdeen, or Perth Ice Rink.

== Swiss Tours ==
The Club has been involved in three Swiss tours, the first in 1963, the second in 2003, and the latest from 19 to 26 January 2013. These "tours" have all been based in Zermatt, where the local ice rink holds an annual Scottish Curling Week.
