= East Berkshire Golf Club =

Golf club in Berkshire, England

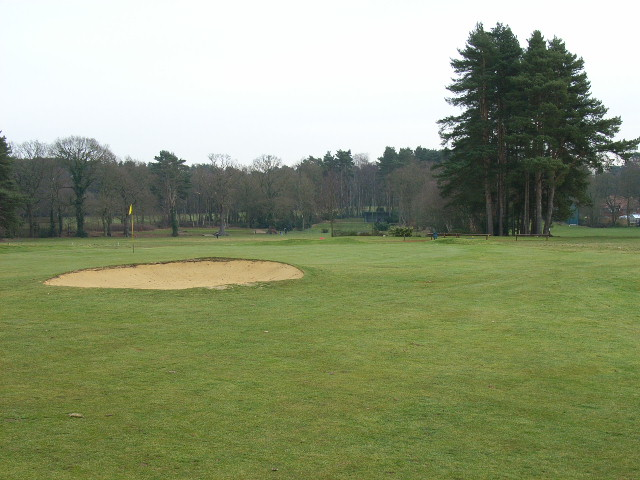

- Location within Berkshire
- 51°22′15″N 0°49′4″W

Club information
- Location: Crowthorne, Berkshire, England
- Established: 1903
- Tota holes: 18
- Designed by: Peter Paxton

East Berkshire Golf Club is a golf club, located in Crowthorne, Berkshire, England. It was established in 1903.

The course was designed by Peter Paxton.
