= James Mansfield (Australian cricketer) =

Australian cricketer

James Emmanuel Mansfield (23 April 1860 – 27 September 1930) was an Australian cricketer who played first-class cricket for Tasmania in 1883/84. He was born at Longford, Tasmania and died at Ascot Vale, Melbourne, Victoria.

Mansfield's only matches were on a tour by Tasmania to New Zealand in 1883/84 in which the same 11 players featured in four first-class games, two each against Otago and Canterbury. In a fairly mobile batting order, Mansfield started out as a middle-order batsman, but lack of success led him to be played further down the batting order and in the final game he batted at No 11, from where he made his highest score, an unbeaten 8 in the second innings against Canterbury.

His death notice in the Melbourne Argus indicated that he died "suddenly" and that he and his wife Alvie had eight children.

== See also ==
- List of Tasmanian representative cricketers
