= Kinglassie =

Coordinates: 56°10′N 3°14′W

Kinglassie: Scottish Gaelic: Cill Ghlasain
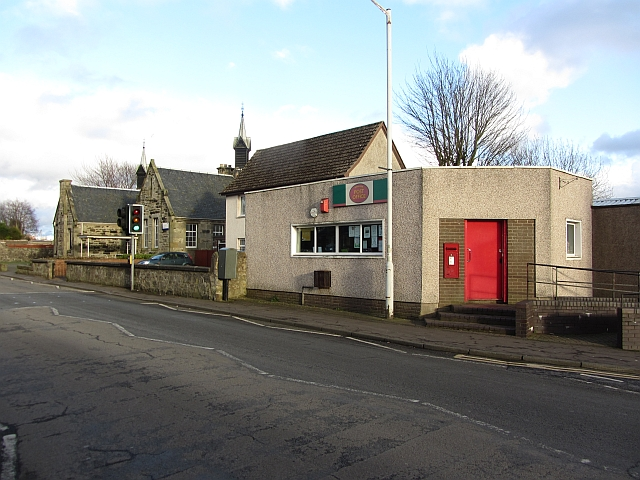
- Kinglassie Post Office

- Location within Fife
- Population: 1,900 (2020)
- Council area: Fife
- Country: Scotland
- Sovereign state: United Kingdom
- Post town: LOCHGELLY
- Postcode district: KY5
- Dialling code: 01592
- Police: Scotland
- Fire: Scottish
- Ambulance: Scottish

Kinglassie (Scottish Gaelic: Cill Ghlasain or Cill Ghlaise) is a small village and parish in central Fife, Scotland. It is located two miles southwest of Glenrothes. It has a population of around 1,900 (2020) The civil parish has a population of 22,543 (in 2011). The village lies to the north of the Lochty Burn, two miles (3.2 km) southwest of Glenrothes in Fife, and two miles southeast of Perth and Kinross district. For many years, it was a weaving village, but in the 19th and 20th centuries it developed as a mining town.

== History ==
The name of the village derives from Scottish Gaelic, although the exact meaning is obscure. The name was first recorded as "Kilglassin" in 1127. The first element, kil, is from the Gaelic, cill, meaning monk's cell or church, though gradually gave way to kin or ceann, meaning head or end, by the 13th century. The element 'glassie' may refer to the Irish saint Glaisne (also commemorated in an Irish townland with the same Gaelic name: Kinglassan~Cill Ghlasáin), or may refer to the word glas meaning 'burn', either as glasain "place of the burn" or glaise, simply "of the burn". Taken together this gives "St Glaisne's Church" or "Church of the Burn" as possible meanings. It is certainly common for cill place names to contain the name of a saint, however the later tradition of a St Glastian or Glascinanus is probably a late medieval attempt to explain the place name, rather than a reflection of a genuinely early saint's cult. Almost nothing of this period remains to be seen in the parish, except for the Dogton Stone, a Pictish cross of the 9th or early 10th century, situated in a field about a mile (1.5 km) to the south, at grid reference – NT 236 968. The lower portion of the stone is all that remains of the cross and badly eroded decoration including a figure of an armed horseman above two beasts can be discerned. It is a scheduled monument.

The administrative or secular district for which the church of Kinglassie served as parochial centre, and with which the later parish of Kinglassie was coextensive, was known as Goatmilkshire, or the schir of Gatemilc.

Kinglassie has a primary school, Mitchell Hall (1896) and the Miners' Welfare Institute (est. 1931). Fife Airport lies about a mile (1.5 km) to the north and, on a hill overlooking the farm of Redwells, stands Blythe's Folly, a 15.6-metre-high (51 ft) tower built in 1812 by an eccentric Leith ship owner. Kinglassie's development during the late 19th and early 20th centuries was marked by its rapid expansion to house mine workers. Many mine workers perished or were injured during the life of the mine. The mine was plagued by water flooding problems. The Kinglassie Pit opened in 1908 and closed in 1967. The Westfield open cast coal mine lies to the west of the village and is still regarded as the biggest man-made hole in Europe by local people.

== School ==
Kinglassie Primary School has a roll of approximately 270 pupils. The school was built to designs by the architect George Charles Campbell in 1912. It has a butterfly type plan consisting of two single storey rendered wings either side of a hexagon shaped hall. The central portion of the façade is two storeys high and of red sandstone, with generous steps leading to a central formal entrance. It is a category B listed building.

The Pupil Council represents pupils in the school. The eco-committee consists of pupils, staff, parents, and members of the wider community, and is proactive in promoting conservation initiatives throughout the school. A parent council represents the parent body and raises funds for various initiatives. In addition, children are supported in class by a growing number of parent helpers and the school is well-supported by parents generally.

== Local landmarks ==
Blythe's Tower, built in 1812, is a four-storey square tower, 15.8 m (52 ft) high, built of rubble with ashlar string courses and a crenellated parapet. It is a category B listed building. The tower's interior was formerly floored to afford access to an observation platform. The tower was built by a linen merchant to view ships as they entered the Forth, affording him the opportunity to procure the best goods at port. During World War II, the tower was used as a look out tower by the home guard.

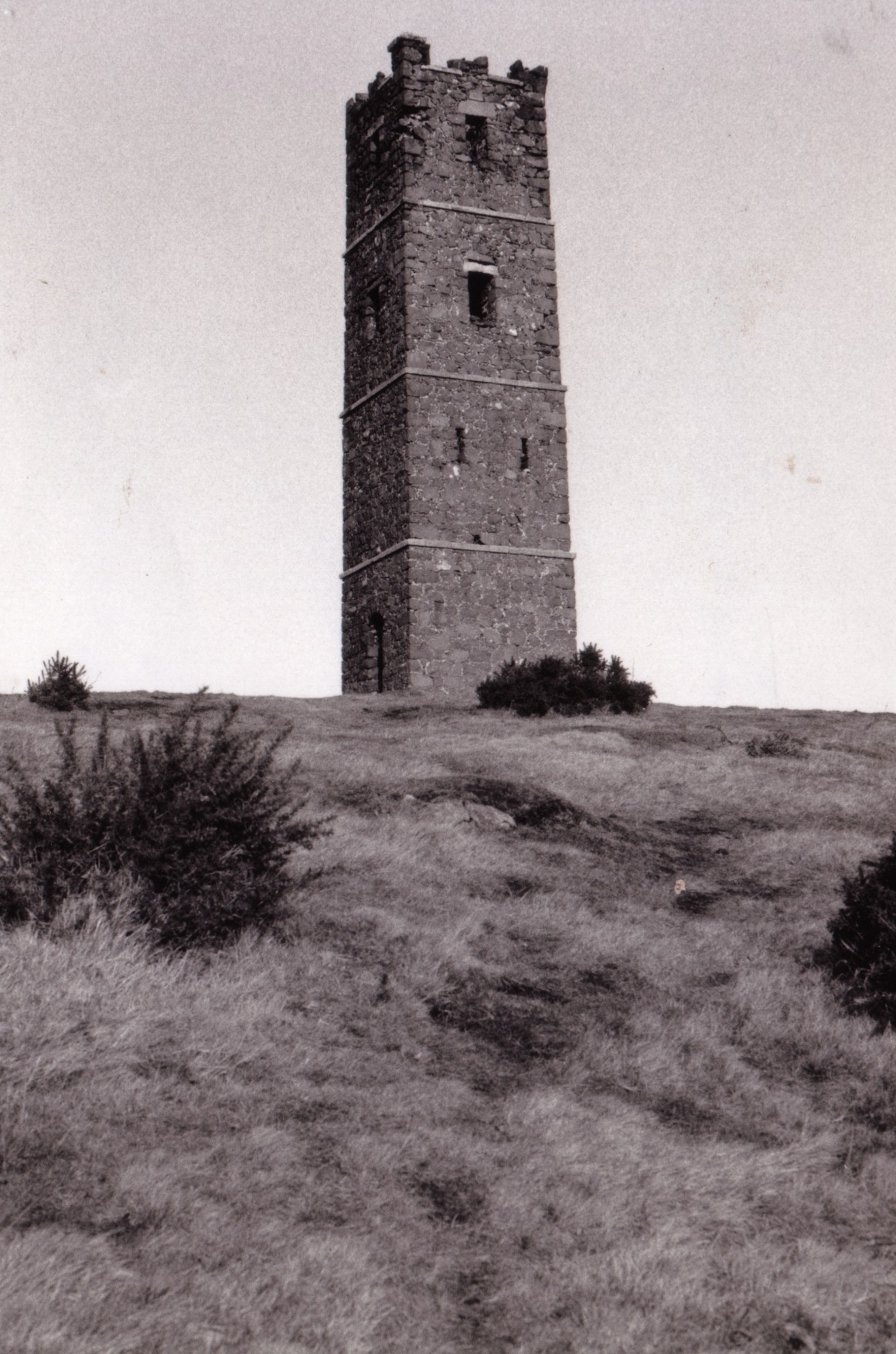
Blythe's Folly, atop Redwells Hill to the North of Kinglassie.

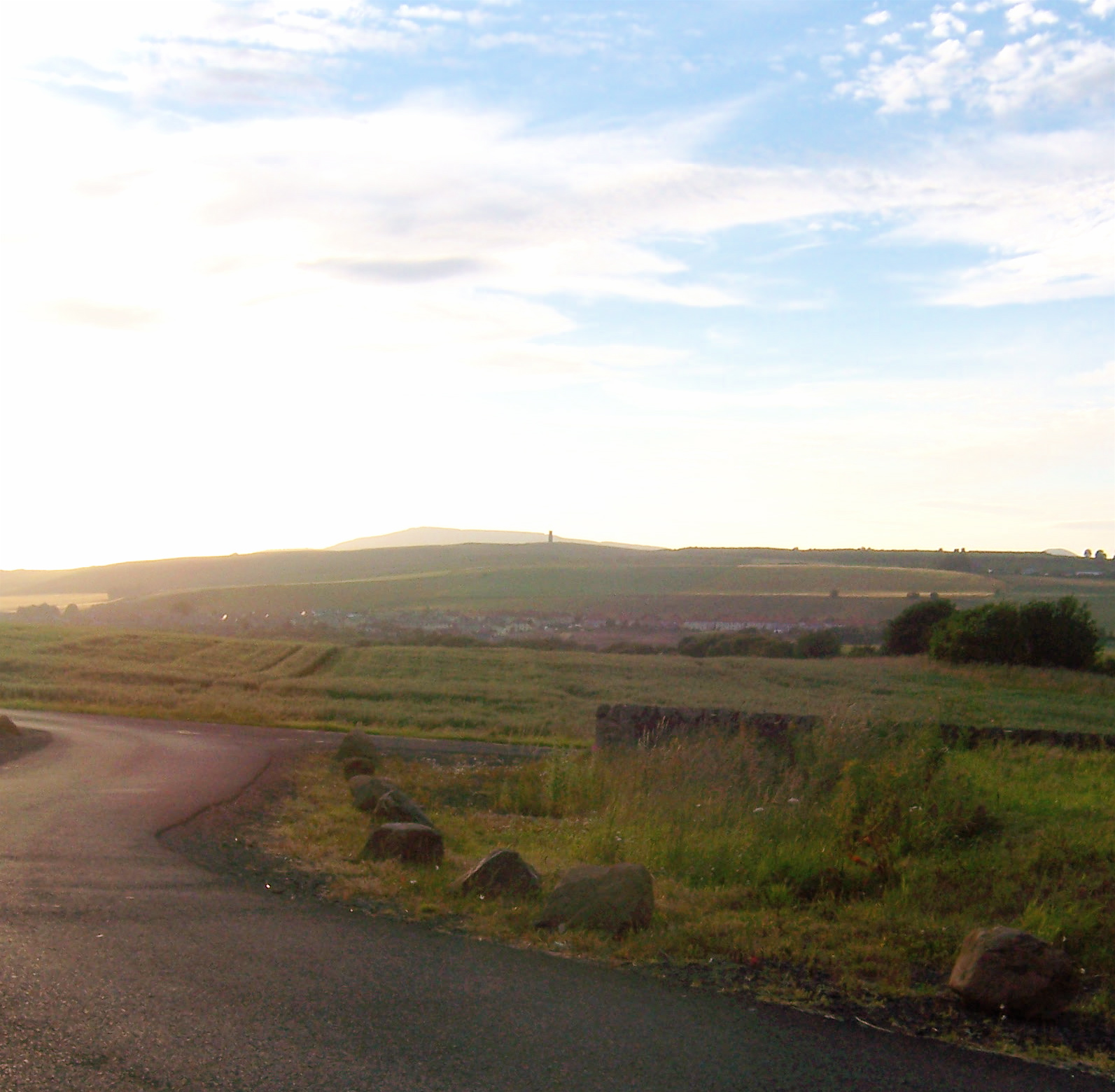
Kinglassie from the South with Blythe's Tower atop Redwells hill to the North.

The Mitchell Hall, built in 1896, was donated to the community by Alexander Mitchell. Mitchell also donated the first Parish Church organ. The Mitchell Hall is used by local community groups and is an asset to the wider Fife community.

== Culture ==
- The Kinglassie & District Pipe Band was reformed in 1982. It is currently in Grade 4a and its members are mostly of school age.
- Fife mining museum, formed in 1992, is located in Kinglassie at the back of the Kinglassie Miners Welfare Institute. The museum closed recently.
- The town is a key stop on the Fife Pilgrim Way walking route, being a historically popular rest point for pilgrims making their way to St Andrews.

== Notable people ==
- Sir William Reid (25 April 1791 – 31 October 1858), governor of Bermuda (1839–46), Barbados (1846–48), and Malta (1851–58); knighted 1851.
- Jimmy Bonthrone, footballer and manager (16 June 1929 – 7 June 2008) played for East Fife 1947–58, Dundee 1958–60; manager, East Fife 1963–69, Aberdeen 1971–75; general manager, East Fife 1980–94; married (two sons).
- Willie Fernie (22 November 1928 – 1 July 2011) was a Scottish footballer who played for the Scotland national football team in both the 1954 and 1958 FIFA World Cups. He also played for Celtic 1948–1958, Middlesbrough 1958–1960, St. Mirren 1961–1963, Partick Thistle 1963, Alloa 1963, Fraserburgh 1963–1964, Coleraine 1964 and Bangor 1964–1965 before becoming manager of Kilmarnock FC 1973–1977.
- T. McEwen junior, Scottish Motorcycle Speed Champion, the championships held on the West Sands, St Andrews on Saturday. He retained the medium-weight and heavyweight titles he secured in 1937 and also added the light-weight championship.
- Alan Murray, founder of Alan Murray Architects, award-winning Edinburgh architectural firm.

== See also ==
Other villages on peripheries of Glenrothes:

- Coaltown of Balgonie (east)
- Leslie (north-west)
- Markinch (north-east)
- Thornton (south)
