= 1876 Open Championship =

Coordinates: 56.043°N 2.823°W

Tournament information
- Dates: 30 September, 2 October 1876
- Location: St Andrews, Scotland
- Course: Old Course at St Andrews

Statistics
- Field: 34 players
- Prize fund: £27
- Winner's share: £10

Champion
- (Scotland) Bob Martin
- 176, playoff

Location in Scotland

The 1876 Open Championship was the 16th Open Championship, held on Saturday 30 September at the Old Course at St Andrews, Fife, Scotland. Bob Martin won the Championship. He had tied with Davie Strath but Strath refused to take part in the playoff and Martin took the title. The combination of a large crowd and the fact that a number of Royal and Ancient Golf Club of St Andrews members were playing the course caused a number of problems. An objection was made against Strath for hitting a spectator at the 17th. The objection was not decided on the evening of the contest and Strath was informed that he would have to play on the Monday, under protest. Objecting to this arrangement, Strath refused to take part.

In the first round Strath reached the turn in 43 and finished with 86. Martin was 42 after the first nine but took 7 at the 17th and also finished on 86. Tom Morris, Sr. scored 90 while Park had a poor start (7-6-6), going out in 49 and finished with 94. In the second round Strath's second shot at the 14th struck a Mr. Hutton (upholsterer), "who was playing out", on the forehead and he fell to the ground. Strath was shaken by the event and scored 6 at the hole followed by another 6 at the next. His tee shot at the 17th ended in the Station Park but he was able to climb the wall and played his second well up the course. There was now a large crowd and Strath's third shot "struck some party standing near the hole" which stopped it and he holed out for a 5, finishing with a 6 for a round of 90. Martin finished 7-5 and also scored 90. Park scored 89 to finish in third place.

The Open was played, like the 1873 tournament, during the Royal and Ancient autumn meeting at St Andrews and many members of the club were playing golf among the competitors. "The links were so crowded by golfers so as to interrupt the play. Often several of the couples had to stand waiting before they could play up to the putting greens. Indeed, to this fact may be traced the unfortunate result of the competition." "The members of the Royal and Ancient might have exercised that courtesy which is invariably accorded them on their medal days." "At the close it was found that Davie Strath and Bob Martin had tied at 176, but the former having, it is said, infringed one of the rules by playing before a previous couple had holed out, and striking one of the spectators, objection was lodged and the matter has been referred to the Club Council. The playoff was due to be played on the Monday "under protest, but Strath refused to do so, and Martin walked over the course." It seems that Club Council were to make their decision after the playoff but Strath felt that the decision should be made before the playoff and refused to take part.

This was the third occasion (after 1870 and 1872) that Strath was runner-up in the Open Championship. He fell ill with consumption in 1878 and went to Australia to recover. He died there in 1878.

== Final leaderboard ==
(Source):

Saturday, 30 September 1876

Place	Player	Score	Money
T1	(Scotland) Bob Martin	86-90=176	Playoff
T1	(Scotland) Davie Strath	86-90=176	Playoff
3	(Scotland) Willie Park, Sr.	94-89=183	£4
T4	(Scotland) Tom Morris, Sr.	90-95=185	Playoff
T4	(Scotland) Mungo Park	95-90=185	Playoff
T4	(Scotland) Willie Thomson	90-95=185	Playoff
7	(England) Henry Lamb (a)	94-92=186	−
T8	(Scotland) Walter Gourlay	98-89=187	Playoff
T8	(Scotland) Bob Kirk	95-92=187	Playoff
T8	(Scotland) George Paxton	95-92=187	Playoff

=== Playoff ===
(Source):

Monday, 2 October 1876

Martin and Strath were due to play an 18-hole playoff but Strath refused to play and the Championship was awarded to Martin. Martin took the first prize of £10 while Strath took £5 for second place.

Morris, Park and Thomson, who tied for fourth place, had a playoff on Monday morning. Tom Morris, Sr. (92) took 4th prize of £3, Mungo Park (94) took 5th prize of £2 while Willie Thomson (96) took 6th prize of £1 10s. Park played with Thomson while Morris played with Willie Park who also scored 92. Morris was out in 43 which included a two at the 8th hole.

There was further playoff on Monday for seventh place. Bob Kirk (94) took 7th prize of £1 (Henry Lamb, as an amateur, could not accept the 7th place prize money). Gourlay (104) took 10s for 8th prize. It seems that George Paxton did not compete.
