= Markinch =

Coordinates: 56.20262°N 3.13504°W

Markinch: Scottish Gaelic: Marc Innis
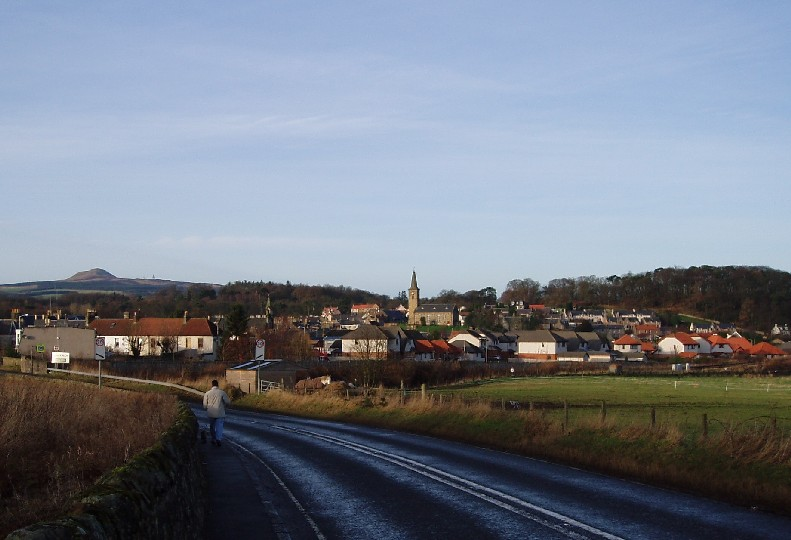
- Markinch from the south

- Location within Fife
- Population: 2,400 (2020)
- OS grid reference: NO296016
- Council area: Fife
- Lieutenancy area: Fife
- Country: Scotland
- Sovereign state: United Kingdom
- Post town: GLENROTHES
- Postcode district: KY7
- Dialling code: 01592
- Police: Scotland
- Fire: Scottish
- Ambulance: Scottish
- UK Parliament: Glenrothes
- Scottish Parliament: Mid Fife and Glenrothes

Markinch (/mɑːrˈkɪntʃ/, Scottish Gaelic: Marc Innis) is both a village and a parish in Fife, Scotland. According to an estimate taken in 2008, the village has a population of 2,420. The civil parish had a population of 16,530 (in 2011). Markinch is east of Fife's administrative centre, Glenrothes, and preceded Cupar as Fife's place of warranty and justice prior to the 13th century.

== History ==
The earliest indications of human activity around Markinch are Balfarg henge and Balbirnie Stone Circle, in an area now incorporated into the new town of Glenrothes, but formerly part of Markinch Parish. They are said to date back to 3,000 BC from the Neolithic period.

The name Markinch derives from the Scottish Gaelic Mark Innis. Mark is the Gaelic for horse, specifically a steed or charger, and innis is the Gaelic for a meadow or an island, here probably meaning a piece of land rising out of or above a body of water or a bog. The earliest written reference is a charter of around 1050 transferring ownership of the church to the Culdees of Loch Leven. Fife's early medieval place of legal assembly is listed as Dalgynch in early Scottish law books and charters. The original site of Dalginch is now believed to have been on the cemetery mound at Northhall, 500m northeast of Markinch Church. This has led to Markinch's designation as "The Capital Place of Fife".

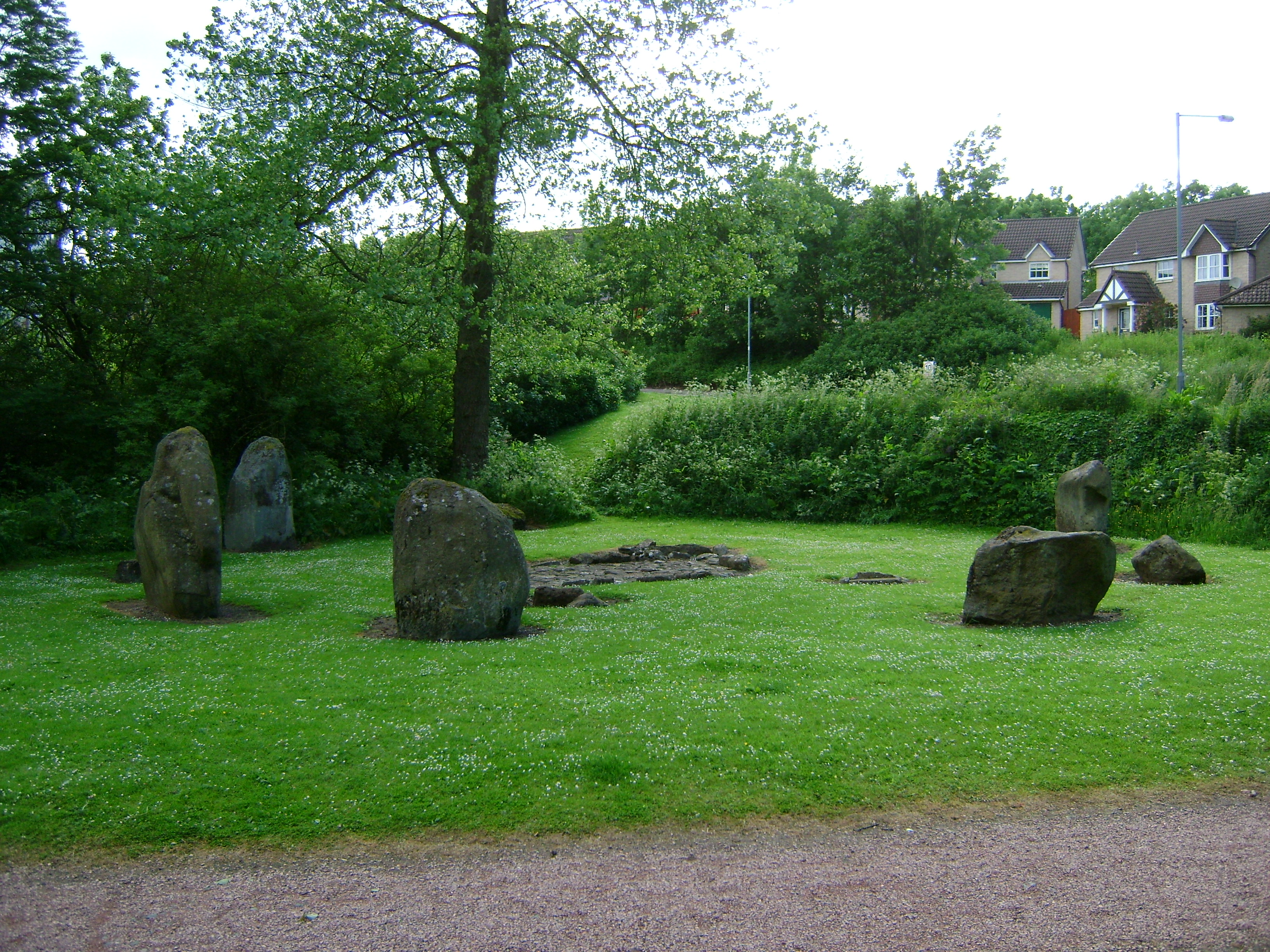
Balbirnie Stone Circle

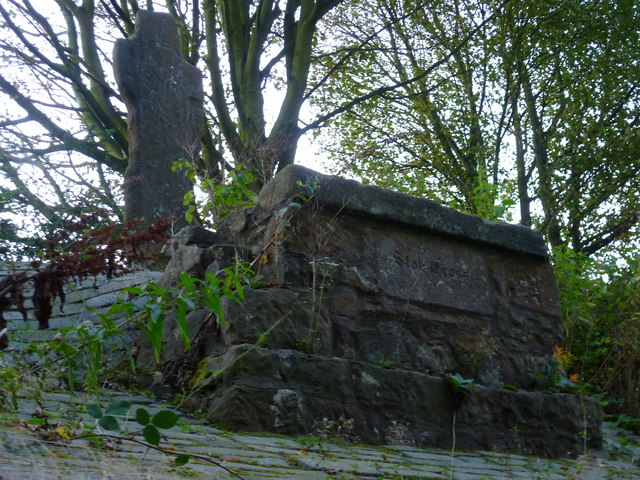
Stob Cross

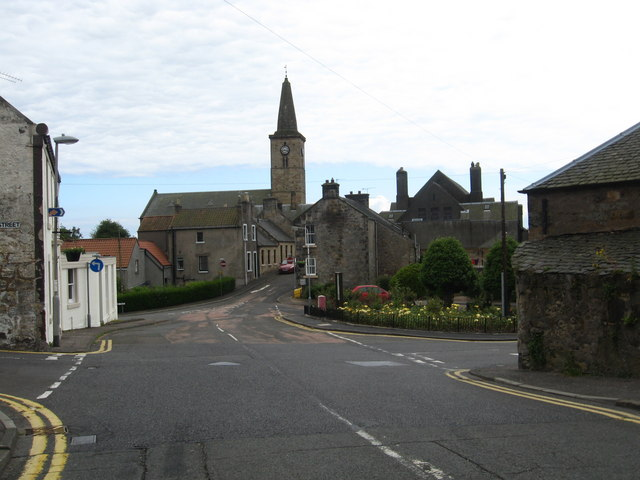
Markinch Parish Kirk from the cross roads of Stob Cross Road/School Street/Kirk Street/Commercial Street

The provincial importance of Markinch under the MacDuff Earls of Fife is likely to account for the very high architectural quality of the early 12th century church tower. The church was originally dedicated to St Drostan but later in the 13th century a re-dedication to St John the Baptist took place. Both saints fair days were celebrated up until the 19th century. The Norman-style tower and the east and west gables date from this early period and chip-cut stone carving can be seen surrounding the tower as well as in reset stones on the south wall. The Hepburn coat of arms was inserted into the west gable by Prior John Hepburn in the early part of the 16th century but none of his work is now visible. The south wall was rebuilt from mainly 12th century masonry when the church was enlarged in the 17th century. Further enlargements to the north took place in the 19th century (1807 and 1884). The octagonal spire on the Norman tower dates from 1807 and is now lacking its four corner pinnacles. 19th century Brunton Church and Balbirnie Church have both been converted for domestic use and the parishes of Thornton and Markinch have been merged.

On the northern outskirts of the town beside the East Lodge of Balbirnie House stands the ancient Stob Cross which may be a Pictish Class II symbol stone defaced during the Reformation. The town is built on the top and sides of a low ridge, which was once high ground surrounded by marshes (innis in Scots Gaelic). The height of this ridge is greater at its northern and southern extremities than at the centre. Markinch Hill has six terraces on the northern side cut into the sand and gravel. These are thought to be either medieval or Neolithic in origin. Recent rhododendron clearance has made them visible once more, and the view from the top of the hill to the south has been restored. The trees on the hill were planted by General Balfour of Balbirnie around 1820.

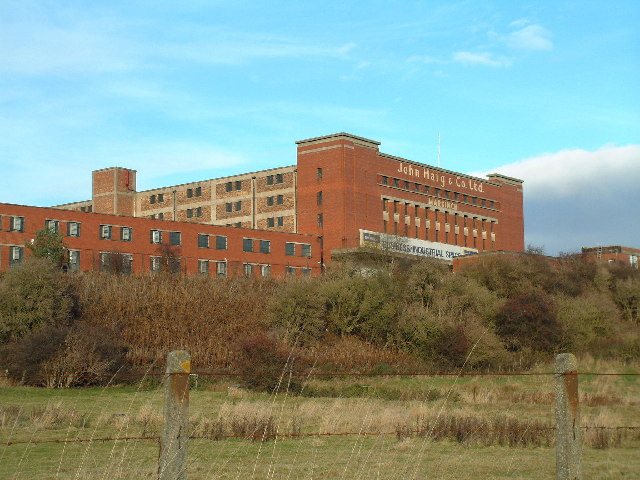
Former headquarters of John Haig & Sons whisky. This building has latterly been used as general industrial and office space but is now threatened with demolition

During the Industrial Revolution in the middle of the 19th century, the village started to adapt to spinning and weaving production. The use of water wheels of the corn and meal mills encouraged new industries to begin along the River Leven on land between Auchmuty (now part of Glenrothes) and Milton of Balgonie in the form of paper mills, bleach mills and ironworks. Papermaking was an important local employer based on the town's close proximity to the River Leven, until one of the two paper mills in the town, Sappi Graphics, closed down in 2001. The Tullis Russell paper mill, however, was still in operation, with a 474 strong workforce, until it went into administration in April 2015. Markinch's former Haig's Whisky bottling plant is now used as a business park and is split into small units. This is where Fife radio station Kingdom FM was based until October 2016. Haig's operated here for over a century until 1983 before moving to modern premises at Banbeath, Leven. It provided employment to a large workforce drawn from the town and from various parts of Fife. A queue of buses would be waiting for them at finishing time. Even in 1983 the workforce comprised some 500 employees. Many local residents still have connections with the firm, now absorbed into Diageo.

Markinch war memorial was erected in 1920 to a design by Sir Robert Lorimer. Further names were added to the memorial following the Second World War.

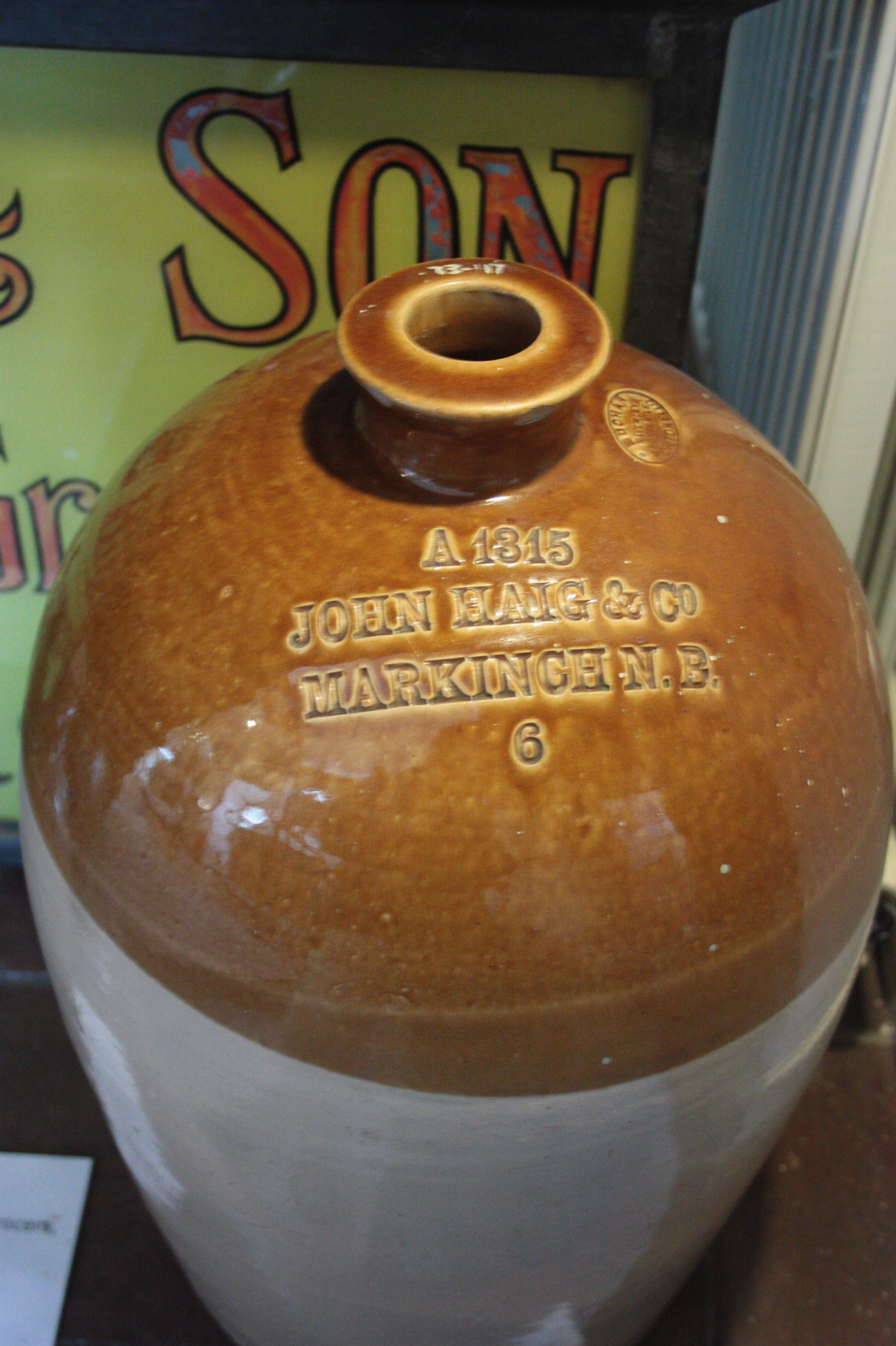
A John Haig whisky flagon from Markinch, Fife Folk Museum

== Sports and recreation ==
The town enjoys a range of local facilities including football, bowling, tennis, a curling club, and parks. Markinch's park is dedicated to Provost John Dixon who presented it to the burgh in 1919. The much larger Balbirnie Park, formerly the property of the Balfour family, lies nearby to the northeast. The park includes a golf course, Balbirnie House Hotel, formerly the Balfour family's home and subsequently the headquarters of Glenrothes Development Corporation, before its latest reincarnation, and craft centre. The popular Markinch Highland Games are held in John Dixon park. Dougray Scott has previously opened the games. The Constituency office of Jenny Gilruth, Scottish National Party, Member of the Scottish Parliament, is in the village.

The town is a key destination on the Fife Pilgrim Way- a historic walking route for pilgrims making their way to St Andrews.

== Transport ==
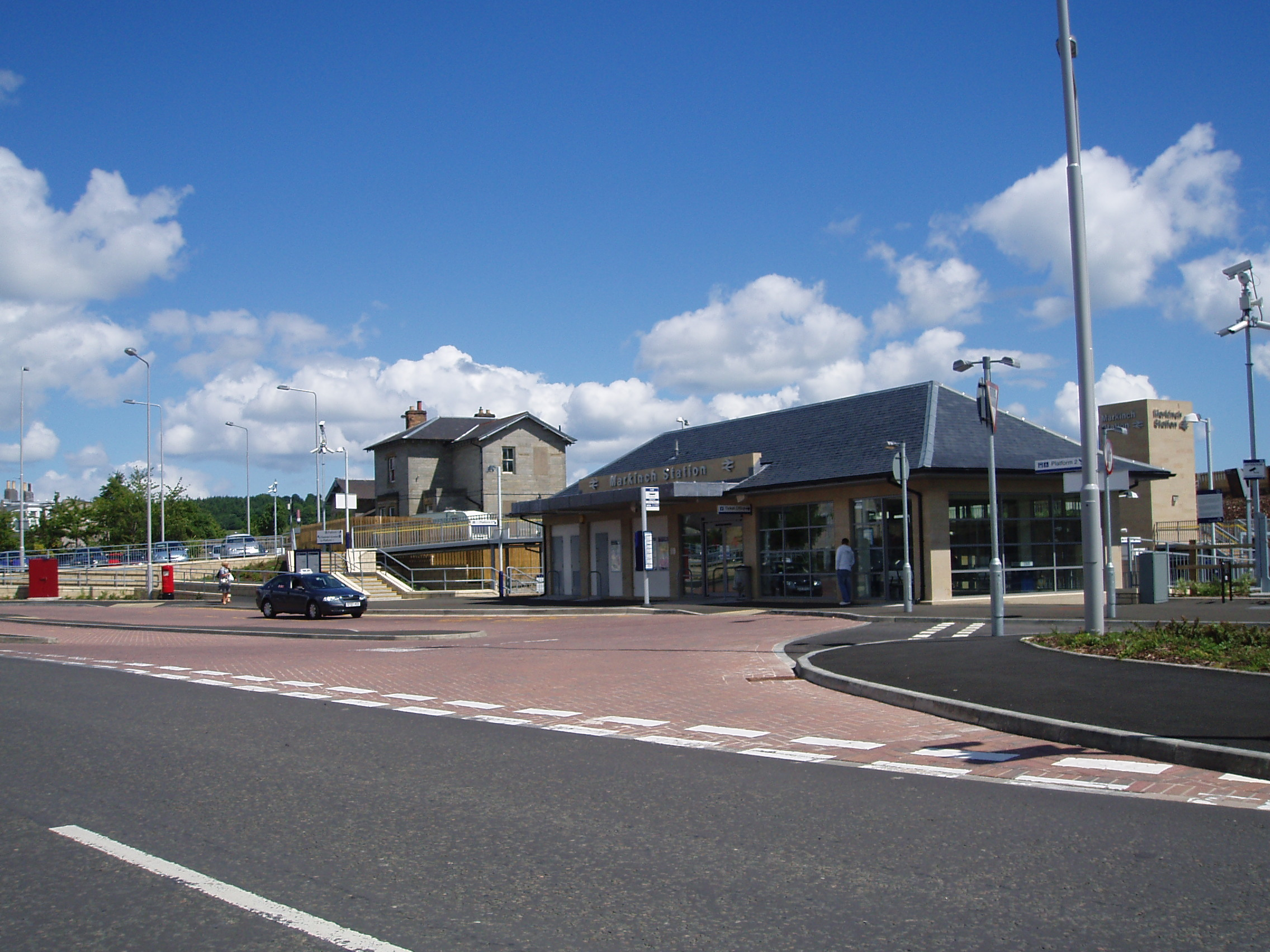
Markinch railway station

Markinch has good transport links being well linked to Dundee, Aberdeen and Edinburgh via rail. Markinch Interchange lies on the Edinburgh to Aberdeen Line and connects to Perth and Inverness, the latter via the Highland Main Line. The station was upgraded in 2007 with a new station building, longer platforms, and park and ride facilities. Regular bus services link the station with Glenrothes and Leven town centres and the surrounding villages.

The station was once a terminus of a branch line, which ran through the land now occupied by Glenrothes between Leslie and Markinch. The line was closed to passengers in 1935, but remained open to freight until 1967. The former branchline now forms part of the Fife Cycle Network and has been named Böblingen Way, after Glenrothes' German Twin Town. Another section of the branch line which linked to Tullis Russell paper mill was still in use until the early 1990s, but this has now also been removed and converted into a cycleway linking to Glenrothes.

Markinch has frequent bus services to Glenrothes and Levenmouth provided by a number of bus service providers. Markinch station was redeveloped to create an interchange for passengers travelling between Leven and Edinburgh/Dundee. Passengers can catch frequent buses from Leven town centre to Markinch railway station, then onwards to towns served by the East Coast Main Line, such as Edinburgh and Kirkcaldy in the south, as well as Perth and Dundee in the north.

While the opening of the Levenmouth rail link in 2024 has made this bus link redundant for rail passengers travelling southbound, there is still a demand for connections to northbound destinations, as the new rail link only has a southbound connection to the main line.

Moffat & Williamson provide the Markinch circular bus service, which links all areas of the village, with Glenrothes, as well as a rural service which meanders through Glenrothes, Coaltown of Balgonie, Star of Markinch, Leven and Buckhaven.

Stagecoach in Fife run the main Leven to Glenrothes bus service, as well as evening and Sunday services.

== Markinch Gap ==
The short valley of the Markinch Gap runs northwest of the village, between the basin of the River Leven and the Howe of Fife, separating the Lomond Hills, to the west, from the Riggin o Fife. Providing the path for the Edinburgh–Aberdeen railway line and the A92 road, it has long been a significant line of communication and transport, heightened by the expansion of the coal and limestone industries to its south and demand for their products to its north. There is a high concentration of ancient monuments at Balfarg and Balbirnie.

== Notable people ==
- James Sievewright (1783-1852), minister, Moderator of the General Assembly of the Free Church of Scotland
- David Jack (1924-2011), pharmacologist, head of research and development at Glaxo
- Jenny Gilruth, (1984-), Deputy First Minister of Scotland

== See also ==
Other villages on peripheries of Glenrothes:

- Coaltown of Balgonie (east)
- Kinglassie (south-west)
- Leslie (north-west)
- Thornton (south)
