= John MacDougall (British politician) =

British politician (1947–2008)

John MacDougall MP
- Official portrait, 2005

Member of Parliament for Glenrothes Central Fife (2001–2005)
- In office 7 June 2001 – 13 August 2008
- Preceded by: Henry McLeish
- Succeeded by: Lindsay Roy
- Majority: 10,664 (28.5%)

Personal details
- Born: John William MacDougall; 8 December 1947 Dunfermline, Fife, Scotland
- Died: 13 August 2008 (aged 60) Kirkcaldy, Fife, Scotland
- Party: Labour
- Children: Julie

John William MacDougall (8 December 1947 – 13 August 2008) was a British Labour politician who served as Member of Parliament (MP) for Glenrothes from the 2005 general election until his death; he was first elected to the House of Commons for Central Fife in the 2001 general election.

He was an active constituency MP who was loyal to the Labour government. From 2007 he was diagnosed with malignant mesothelioma, and due to his illness, his participation in Parliament became fleeting, although he remained as an MP until his death in August the following year.

== Early life ==
MacDougall was educated at Templehall Junior Secondary School in Kirkcaldy, Fife. He later obtained a diploma in industrial management and a certificate in naval architecture studies. He began work as an apprentice caulker riveter at Rosyth Dockyard, but his main working life was spent as a boilermaker from 1964 at the oil rig construction yard in Methil. He became a shop steward for the GMB trade union, later full-time Shop Steward Convenor. He had a daughter, Julie, who would later become a Reform UK MSP.

== Political career ==
=== Fife councillor ===
After joining the Labour Party in 1981, MacDougall was elected as a member of Fife Regional Council for Burntisland the following year. He became leader of the regional council in 1987, formally as Chairman of the Policy and Resources Committee, leaving work to be a full-time councillor, and serving until the Regional Council was abolished in the reform of local government.

MacDougall was elected to the new Fife unitary council in 1995 and became Convenor of the council when it assumed its powers in April 1996. MacDougall's position as leader led him to accept several other appointments, including as Chair of the Rosyth Dockyard and Naval Base Coordinating Committee, a director of Fife Enterprise, and Chair and director of Community Business Fife Ltd. In the mid-1990s he led the council's efforts to keep the Rosyth base open, including writing to every Conservative MP to ask them to support a defence review not led by the Treasury. He was a member of the Scottish Constitutional Convention which established the framework for the Scottish Parliament.

=== Parliament ===
When Henry McLeish announced that he would stand down from his UK Parliament seat in Central Fife on moving to the Scottish Parliament, MacDougall was thought to be likely to be beaten to the selection as his successor by the former Labour Party general secretary Alex Rowley. However MacDougall was announced as the winner of the ballot.

MacDougall won with a majority of 10,075.

==== Boundary changes ====
A boundary review cutting the number of United Kingdom Parliamentary seats in Scotland put MacDougall's seat in danger by enlarging it with parts taken from Kirkcaldy; it was rumoured that Kirkcaldy MP Lewis Moonie intended to challenge MacDougall. MacDougall was said to be "absolutely distraught" and intended to defend himself. He was mentioned as a potential candidate for the Central Fife constituency in the Scottish Parliament when Henry McLeish announced his retirement; however the selection went to his successor as council leader, Christine May. MacDougall won the selection for the new Glenrothes constituency when Lewis Moonie opted to retire instead.

== Burns translation ==
To celebrate Burns Night in 2003, MacDougall had some of Robert Burns' most famous poems translated out of the Scots language into contemporary English to make them comprehensible for English guests. When Labour MPs were reported to be plotting to get Tony Blair to resign the leadership in favour of Gordon Brown, MacDougall was quoted as a supporter of Brown in opposing the plotting as not in his interests.

== Illness and death ==
In May 2007 MacDougall revealed that he had serious health problems. He had had major surgery and a lung removed after being diagnosed with Mesothelioma, which transpired after his death came from the shipyards, but his doctor expected him to return to full health after he took part in the MARS Trial. In October it was said that he was likely to stand down in the event of a snap general election; however no election was called.

MacDougall was not recorded as having participated in any Parliamentary votes from early December 2007, and by June 2008 it was clear that his health problems were serious and there was a rumour that he would have to resign. However another rumour said that he was recovering and likely to return to work. MacDougall attended the House of Commons on 11 June 2008 to support the government on a knife-edge vote on pre-charge detention periods, giving an interview in which he admitted to having had an operation for pleural mesothelioma; he declared his intention to stand for re-election. However, MacDougall died of mesothelioma at 6 AM on 13 August 2008 at the Victoria Hospital in Kirkcaldy.

Parliament of the United Kingdom
Preceded by Henry McLeish	Member of Parliament for Central Fife; 2001–2005	Constituency abolished
New constituency	Member of Parliament for Glenrothes; 2005–2008	Succeeded by Lindsay Roy
