= Central Fife (UK Parliament constituency) =

UK Parliament constituency (1974–2005)

- Former county constituency for the House of Commons
- Boundary of Central Fife in Scotland for the 2001 general election
- Subdivisions of Scotland: Fife

1974–2005
- Created from: West Fife
- Replaced by: Glenrothes; North East Fife

Central Fife was a parliamentary constituency represented in the House of Commons of the Parliament of the United Kingdom from February 1974 until 2005, when it was largely replaced by the new Glenrothes constituency, with a small portion joining the expanded North East Fife.

It elected one Member of Parliament (MP), using the first-past-the-post voting system.

== Boundaries ==
=== 1974–1983 ===
The burghs of Cowdenbeath, Leslie, Lochgelly, and Markinch, the districts of Glenrothes and Lochgelly, and the electoral divisions of Markinch North and Markinch South in the district of Kirkcaldy.

=== 1983–1997 ===
The Kirkcaldy District electoral divisions of:

- Denbeath/Aberhill
- Mountfleurie/Methilhill/Methil North
- Leven
- Kennoway/Windygates
- Leslie/Markinch Star
- Auchmuty/Woodside
- Pitteuchar/Stenton/Balgonie
- South Parks/Rimbleton
- Southwood/Caskieberran

=== 1997–2005 ===
The Kirkcaldy District electoral divisions of:

- Methil, Denbeath and Muiredge
- Methilhill and Mountfleurie
- Leven
- Kennoway and Windygates
- Markinch, Pitcoudie and Star
- Auchmuty, Woodside and Coaltown of Balgonie
- Pitleuchar and Stenton
- Rimbleton and South Parks
- Glenwood and Newcastle
- Leslie and Collydean

== Members of Parliament ==
Election	Member	Party
Feb 1974	Willie Hamilton	Labour
1987	Henry McLeish	Labour
2001	John MacDougall	Labour
2005	constituency abolished	

== Elections ==
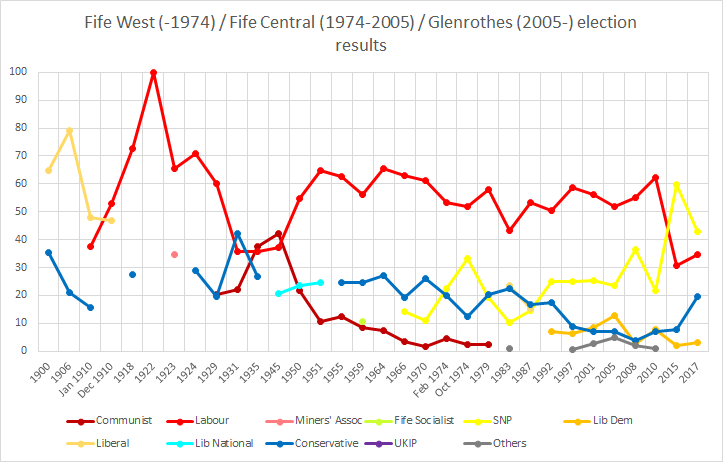
Fife West election results

=== Elections of the 1970s ===
General election February 1974: Central Fife
Party	Candidate	Votes	%	±%
Labour	Willie Hamilton	24,418	53.3	
SNP	David Veitch Livingstone	10,324	22.5	
Conservative	Stephen Ronald Eyres	9,098	19.8	
Communist	Alexander Maxwell	2,019	4.4	
Majority		14,094	30.8	
Turnout		45,859	79.2	
Labour win (new seat)				

General election October 1974: Central Fife
Party	Candidate	Votes	%	±%
Labour	Willie Hamilton	22,400	51.9	−1.4
SNP	David Veitch Livingstone	14,414	33.4	+10.9
Conservative	Peter Derek Clarke	5,308	12.3	−7.5
Communist	Alexander Maxwell	1,040	2.4	−2.0
Majority		7,986	18.5	−12.3
Turnout		43,162	73.9	−5.3
Labour hold		Swing		

General election 1979: Central Fife
Party	Candidate	Votes	%	±%
Labour	Willie Hamilton	27,619	58.0	+6.1
Conservative	Iain Allistair McCrone	9,597	20.2	+7.9
SNP	James Lynch	9,208	19.4	−14.0
Communist	Alexander Maxwell	1,172	2.5	+0.1
Majority		18,022	37.8	+19.3
Turnout		47,596	77.4	+3.5
Labour hold		Swing		

=== Elections of the 1980s ===
General election 1983: Central Fife
Party	Candidate	Votes	%	±%
Labour	Willie Hamilton	17,008	43.1	−11.2
Liberal	Teresa Little	9,214	23.4	New
Conservative	Douglas Mason	8,863	22.5	0.0
SNP	James Taggart	4,039	10.2	−12.3
Ecology	David Allison	297	0.8	New
Majority		7,794	19.7	
Turnout		39,421	72.5	
Labour hold		Swing		

General election 1987: Central Fife
Party	Candidate	Votes	%	±%
Labour	Henry McLeish	22,827	53.4	+10.3
Conservative	Richard Aird	7,118	16.7	−5.8
Liberal	Teresa Little	6,487	15.2	−8.2
SNP	Dan Hood	6,296	14.7	+4.5
Majority		15,709	36.7	+17.0
Turnout		42,728	72.6	+0.1
Labour hold		Swing	+8.0	

=== Elections of the 1990s ===
General election 1992: Central Fife
Party	Candidate	Votes	%	±%
Labour	Henry McLeish	21,036	50.4	−3.0
SNP	Tricia Marwick	10,458	25.1	+10.4
Conservative	Carol Cender	7,353	17.6	+0.9
Liberal Democrats	Craig Harrow	2,892	6.9	−8.3
Majority		10,578	25.3	−11.4
Turnout		41,739	74.3	+1.7
Labour hold		Swing		

General election 1997: Central Fife
Party	Candidate	Votes	%	±%
Labour	Henry McLeish	23,912	58.7	+7.9
SNP	Tricia Marwick	10,199	25.0	−0.1
Conservative	Jacob Rees-Mogg	3,669	9.0	−8.6
Liberal Democrats	Ross Laird	2,610	6.4	−0.5
Referendum	John Scrymgeour-Wedderburn	375	0.9	New
Majority		13,713	33.7	+8.4
Turnout		40,765	69.8	−4.5
Labour hold		Swing		

=== Elections of the 2000s ===
General election 2001: Central Fife
Party	Candidate	Votes	%	±%
Labour	John MacDougall	18,310	56.3	−2.4
SNP	David Alexander	8,235	25.3	+0.3
Liberal Democrats	Elizabeth Riches	2,775	8.5	+2.1
Conservative	Jeremy Balfour	2,351	7.2	−1.8
Scottish Socialist	Morag Balfour	841	2.6	New
Majority		10,075	31.0	−2.7
Turnout		32,512	54.6	−15.2
Labour hold		Swing		

== See also ==
- Central Fife (Scottish Parliament constituency)
