= Coaltown of Balgonie =

Village in Fife, Scotland

Coordinates: 56.184030°N 3.1290467°W

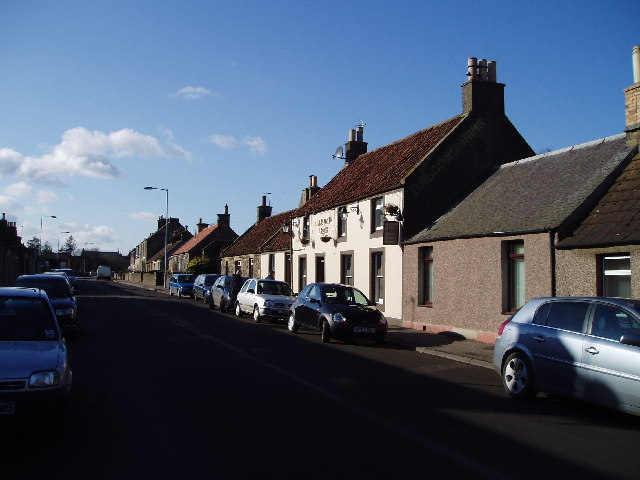

- Location within Fife
- Population: 990 (2020)
- Council area: Fife
- Country: Scotland
- Sovereign state: United Kingdom
- Post town: GLENROTHES
- Postcode district: KY7
- Dialling code: 01592
- Police: Scotland
- Fire: Scottish
- Ambulance: Scottish

Coaltown of Balgonie is a village of 1,059 people (2011 census) in south central Fife. It is located on the B9130 road, next to the new town of Glenrothes. Coaltown has a Premier shop, a pub (the Balgonie Arms), a bowling green (Balgonie Bowling Club), a village hall ( Victoria Hall), an undertakers, and a garage (Balgonie Motors). There is a playpark for children beside the primary school. Opposite the school is the football pitch for local team, Balgonie Scotia AFC.

== Sports ==
Balgonie Scotia AFC was founded in 1896. They play at King George V Park. They are one of the oldest amateur teams in Scotland.

== Education ==
Coaltown of Balgonie Primary School was opened in August 1889. It is a village school with two campuses. The main building is at the end of School Road and it sits in a countryside environment. It houses 4 classrooms, toilet block, staff resource base and the usual office provision. The annexe building is the old Miners' Welfare Institute at the top of School Road and houses a classroom along with the kitchen and dining/gym hall. The school has won various Eco-school awards and they have a large nature area outside both buildings.

For secondary education, pupils are catchment allocated to Auchmuty High School, a short distance away, in Glenrothes. There are private bus links to St Paul's Roman Catholic Primary School in Glenrothes and St Andrews R.C. High School in Kirkcaldy.

== Transport ==
Frequent bus services depart the village for Glenrothes, Markinch, and Leven. A short walk away is Bankhead Roundabout, and regular express services throughout central Scotland depart from here, as well as local services to destinations within Fife. Bus services are provided by Stagecoach East Scotland, and local bus and coach company Moffat & Williamson.

Although the East Coast Main Line runs through the village, Coaltown does not have a railway station. The nearest options are Glenrothes with Thornton railway station, located in Thornton, providing links to the Fife Circle Line, or Markinch railway station for trains to Inverness, Aberdeen, Dundee, Perth, and Edinburgh.

== See also ==
Other villages on peripheries of Glenrothes:

- Kinglassie (south-west)
- Leslie (north-west)
- Markinch (north-east)
- Thornton (south)
