= Bob Ferguson (golfer) =

Scottish golfer (1846–1915)

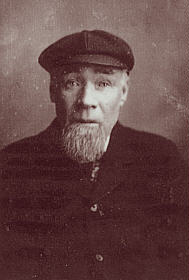
- Bob Ferguson, c. 1903

Personal information
- Full name: Robert Ferguson
- Nationality: Scotland
- Born: c. 1846 Musselburgh, Scotland
- Died: 19 May 1915 (aged 69) Musselburgh, Scotland

Career
- Sport: Golf
- Status: Professional

Best results in major championships (wins: 3)
- The Open Championship: Won: 1880, 1881, 1882

Robert Ferguson (c. 1846 – 19 May 1915) was a Scottish professional golfer who was one of the top players from the mid-1860s into the 1880s. He won a hat-trick of consecutive titles at The Open Championship in 1880, 1881 and 1882.

In addition to the three Open Championship wins, he posted top-10 finishes seven times.

== Career ==
Ferguson was born in Musselburgh, East Lothian, Scotland, circa 1846.

In addition to his three Open Championship titles, Ferguson was especially noted for his putting, not only on the green but off. He specialized in "run up" shots with his putter—the so-called "Musselburgh iron"—from well off the green. He is one of only four men who have won The Open three years in a row. The prize for his first win was £7.

Ferguson's home town of Musselburgh was one of the three venues in the Open Championship rotation. He started caddying there at the age of eight, and played his first competition at Leith when he was 18. He was a tall man, and was known as a long driver. He sometimes partnered with fellow Musselburgh top player Willie Park Sr., a four-time Open champion, in stakes matches, facing opponents such as the father-and-son team of Old Tom Morris and Young Tom Morris, of St. Andrews, between the mid-1860s and mid-1870s. Both of the Morrises were four-time Open champions. He also faced Young Tom Morris in singles play during this era. His playing career was cut short by a bout of typhoid, and he became the custodian of the Links at Musselburgh.

== Death and legacy ==
Ferguson died in Musselburgh on 19 May 1915.

== Major championships ==
=== Wins (3) ===
Year	Championship	18/24 holes	Winning score	Margin	Runner-up
1880	The Open Championship	1 shot lead	40-41-42-39=162	5 strokes	(Scotland) Peter Paxton
1881	The Open Championship (2)	3 shot lead	53-60-57=170	3 strokes	(Scotland) Jamie Anderson
1882	The Open Championship (3)	3 shot lead	83-88=171	3 strokes	(Scotland) Willie Fernie

=== Results timeline ===
Tournament	1868	1869	1870	1871	1872	1873	1874	1875	1876	1877	1878	1879
The Open Championship	5			NT			T8	4		T3		6

Tournament	1880	1881	1882	1883	1884	1885	1886	1887	1888	1889
The Open Championship	1	1	1	2			T4			T15

- Note: Ferguson played only in The Open Championship.
Win
Top 10
Did not play

NT = No tournament
"T" indicates a tie for a place
