= Tom Kidd (golfer) =

Scottish golfer (c.1848–1884)

Personal information
- Full name: Christopher Thomas Kidd
- Nationality: Scotland
- Born: c.1848 St. Andrews, Scotland
- Died: 16 January 1884 (aged 35 or 36) St. Andrews, Scotland

Career
- Sport: Golf
- Status: Professional

Best results in major championships (wins: 1)
- The Open Championship: Won: 1873

Christopher Thomas Kidd (c.1848 – 16 January 1884) was a Scottish professional golfer who played in the late 19th century. He won the 1873 Open Championship on his home course at St Andrews, Scotland.

== Early life and career ==
He was a caddie from St Andrews and won the 1873 Open Championship over his home links. It was the first Open played on the Old Course. Conditions were wet and Kidd's winning score of 179 was the highest in any Open Championship played over 36 holes.

His cash prize was £11. He was known as Tom Kidd or "Young Tom Kidd" to distinguish him from his father Tom Kidd who was also a caddie and died in the poorhouse in Markinch in 1896. Kidd married Eliza (or Elizabeth) Lumsden in November 1874 aged 25, when he is described as a golf caddie. He died suddenly of a heart problem in 1884 and left two surviving children. His wife did not remarry and died in Cupar in 1935.

At a court for the renewal of drink licences in St Andrews in April 1884, the inspector of police said that the licensee of the Golf Inn, George Leslie, illegally bought clubs and similar items for drinks. After Kidd's death his cleek and iron were found in Leslie's possession together with the gold medal for winning the 1873 Open. Leslie had paid 2 shillings each for the club and 10 shillings for the gold medal. The three items were later bought by a third party and the gold medal returned to his widow. Leslie denied the allegation stating that he had bought the clubs but not the medal. The medal had been taken as surety for a 10 shilling loan. He claimed that, at the time Kidd was a "Good Templar" and "not a shilling" of the money had been spent in the inn. It was considered a "very suspicious case". After an adjournment the licence was granted by a majority of 3 to 2.

== Death and legacy ==
Kidd died due to a heart problem on 16 January 1884, aged 35 or 36, and left behind a wife and two children. He won the 1873 Open Championship, and was also the first player to be awarded the Claret Jug, which has been the winner's trophy for The Open Championship ever since (although Young Tom Morris, who won the previous year, was the first whose name was engraved on the trophy).

== Major championships ==
=== Wins (1) ===
Year	Championship	18 holes	Winning score	Margin	Runner-up
1873	The Open Championship	Tied for lead	91-88=179	1 stroke	(Scotland) Jamie Anderson

=== Results timeline ===
Tournament	1873	1874	1875	1876	1877	1878	1879	1880	1881	1882
The Open Championship	1	T8		T17			5			T11

- Note: The Open Championship was the only major played during Kidd's lifetime.
Win
Top 10
Did not play

"T" indicates a tie for a place
