= St Andrews Golf Club =

Private golf club in Scotland

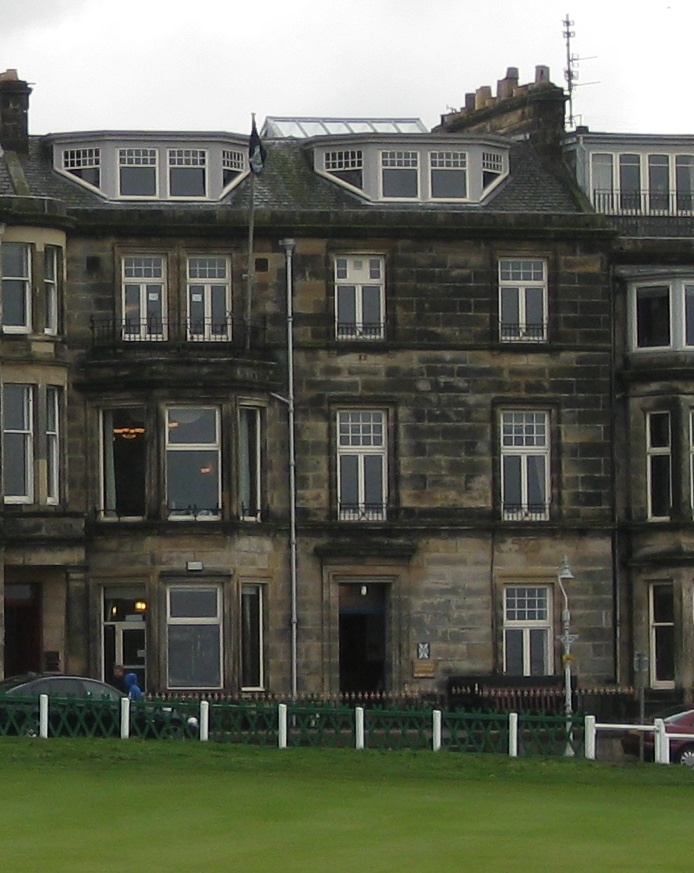
- Links House, the clubhouse of St Andrews Golf Club, overlooking the Old Course

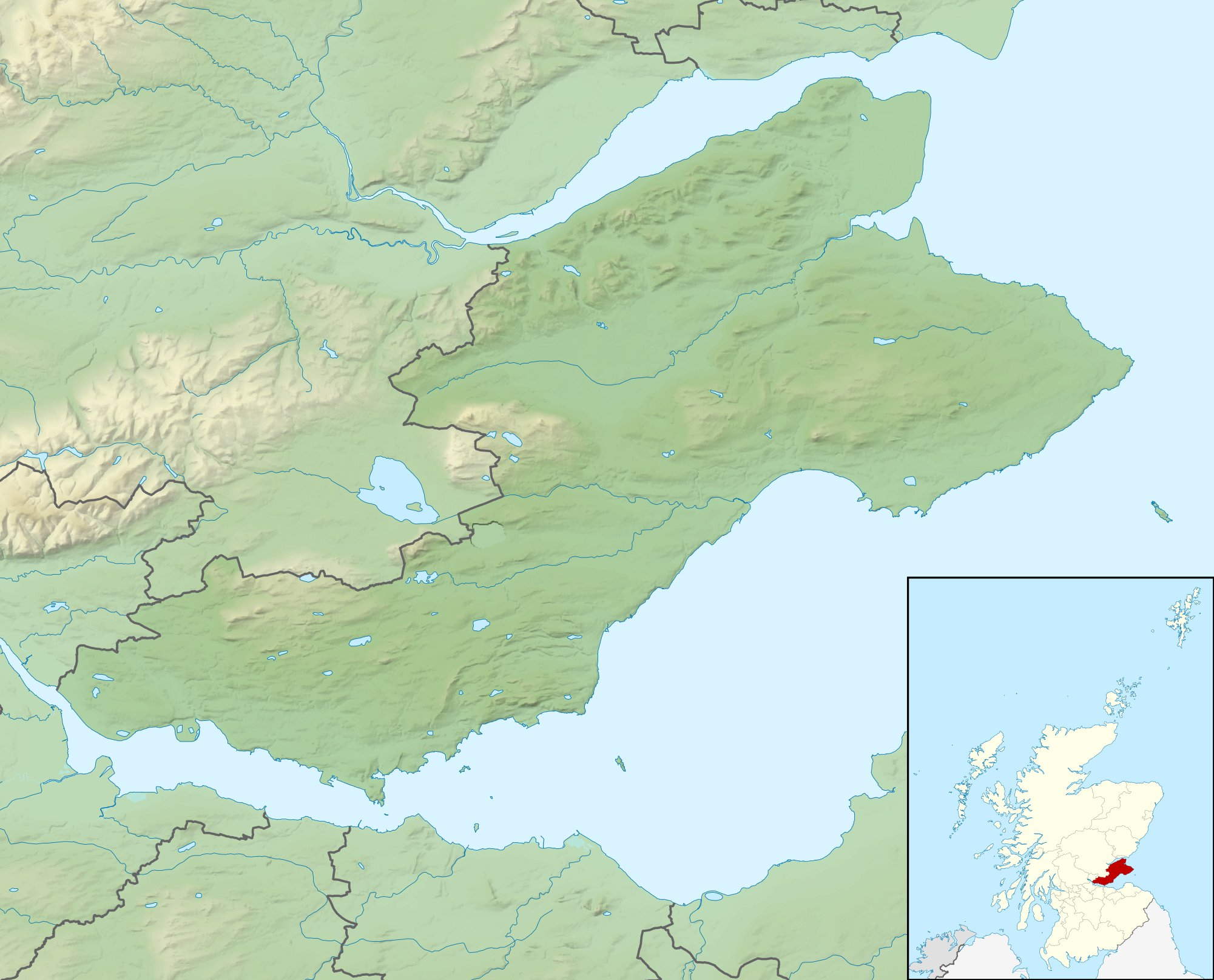
- Location within Fife
- 56.34270°N 2.80347°W

Club information
- Location: Links House, 13 The Links, St Andrews, Scotland.
- Established: 29 September 1843 (182 years ago)
- Type: Private club. Public link courses
- Owner: St Andrews Golf Club Limited
- Website: thestandrewsgolfclub.co.uk

St Andrews Golf Club clubhouse

Listed Building – Category C(S)
- Official name: 13 The Links, Links House, St Andrews Golf Club with Boundary Wall and Railings
- Designated: 12 December 2001; 24 years ago
- Reference no.: LB48319

St Andrews Golf Club, originally known as St Andrews Mechanics Golf Club, is a private members' golf club located in St Andrews, Scotland. The club is one of the oldest golf clubs in the world, having been established in 1843.

The club does not own its own golf course; instead, members use the seven courses comprising St Andrews Links, who are owned by Fife Council and operated by a charitable trust. The club owns its clubhouse, adjacent to the Old Course, the most famous of the St Andrews courses. Former members of the club have won The Open Championship, including Old Tom Morris and Young Tom Morris who both won the title on four occasions each. In total 11 members have won the title with 20 victories.

== History ==
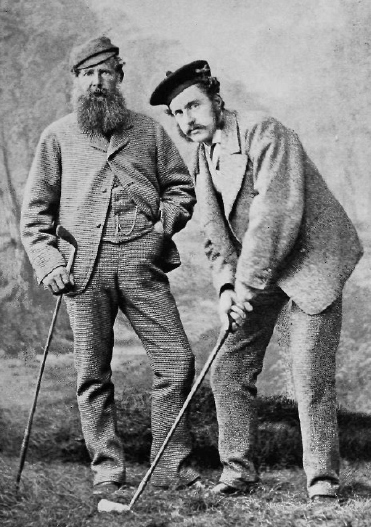
Old Tom Morris (L) and Young Tom Morris (R) were both members of St Andrews Golf Club.

The St Andrews Golf Club was established by 11 local tradesmen on 29 September 1843 as the St Andrews Mechanics Golf Club. The founding members were: William Ayton (Cabinet maker), John Keddie (Joiner), George Morris (Butler) elder brother of Old Tom Morris, Alexander Bruce (Cabinet maker), John Lynn (Tailor), Robert Patterson (Slater), Alexander Carstairs (Cabinet maker), Adam McPherson (Plasterer), David Todd Junior (Painter), James Herd (Mason), and James McPherson (Dancing Master).

In 1851 it was proposed by the then club captain, James Howie, that the club should change its name to St Andrews Golf Club or similar name. On 22 September 1853, the Fifeshire Journal reported that the Mechanics Golf Club had changed its name to the St Andrews Golf Club. In the second half of the 19th century the St Andrews Golf Club was the strongest golf club in Scotland, with members such as Allan Robertson, he is generally regarded as being the best golfer in Scotland from 1843 until his death. However he never had the chance to play in The Open Championship. When Robertson died, no one knew who the best golfer was, and so a tournament was born to determine the name of the champion golfer of the year.

Other members included Old Tom Morris, who was a long-time member of the club, Young Tom Morris and many others, who built the club's reputation in challenge matches, the early Open Championships and team games. The following members won 18 Open Championships in the 19th century, and a further 2 in the 20th century: Old Tom Morris (1861, 1862, 1864, 1867), Young Tom Morris (1868, 1969, 1870, 1872), Tom Kidd (1873), Bob Martin (1876, 1885), Jamie Anderson (1877, 1878, 1879), Willie Fernie (1883), Jack Burns (1888), Hugh Kirkaldy (1891), William Auchterlonie (1893), Sandy Herd (1902), and Jock Hutchison (1921). Club members have also won U.S. Open titles too, with James Foulis (1896), Fred Herd (1898) and Laurie Auchterlonie (1902).

Allan Robertson and Old Tom Morris of the St Andrews Golf Club were an intimidating challenging team, occasionally called "the invincibles". Large sums of money for the matches was put up by sponsors, with the players who won also getting a percentage, but they also made their own bets too. Team matches are a tradition within the St Andrews Golf Club. The first match that was arranged was against Leven in 1849 with teams of 6 players on each side.

=== The clubhouse ===
Historically golfing societies and clubs would normally meet in either a local hotel or member's house close to the golf course. Official clubhouses became popular in Scotland from the mid-nineteenth century as the game's popularity increased. The St Andrews Golf Club first purchased a clubhouse in 1905 in nearby Golf Place. In 1932, the club purchased Links House for £2,700. It cost a further £2,000 to convert it to a clubhouse. The new clubhouse was officially opened on 20 July 1933. It was built at the end of the 19th century, and overlooks the 18th green on the Old Course at St Andrews and across from the Royal and Ancient clubhouse. It was listed as a Grade C building on 12 December 2001. The club has used Links House as their clubhouse since 1933.

== Membership ==
Membership of the club has grown over the years from 11 at its foundation in 1843, to 535 in 1927, 1,013 in 1947 and to over 2,000 members in 1998.

=== Honorary members ===
Bobby Jones became an honorary member in 1958. He was a winner of 13 major golf championships and the only man to have won the Grand Slam, winning the U.S. Open, U.S. Amateur, the British Open, and the British Amateur Championship all in the same year of 1930.

Jack Nicklaus became an honorary member during the 1978 Open Championship whilst he was still halfway through the event at St Andrews. He is the winner of 18 major golf championships, including 3 Open titles, 4 U.S. Open titles, 6 Masters titles, and 5 U.S. PGA Championship titles.

Sir Michael Bonallack became an honorary member in 1990 having won The Amateur Championship on fives occasions and Paul Lawrie became an Honorary member on 6 October 1999 having won the Open Championship in the same year at Carnoustie Golf Links.

== See also ==
- Golf in Scotland
- R&A World Golf Museum
- List of listed buildings in St Andrews, Fife
