= Alexander Doleman =

Scottish amateur golfer (1836–1914)

Personal information
- Full name: Alexander Hamilton Doleman
- Nationality: Scotland
- Born: c. 1836 Musselburgh, Scotland
- Died: 12 September 1914 (aged 78) Blackpool, Lancashire

Career
- Sport: Golf
- Status: Amateur

Best results in major championships
- Masters Tournament: DNP
- PGA Championship: DNP
- U.S. Open: DNP
- The Open Championship: T9: 1870

Alexander Hamilton Doleman (c. 1836 – 12 September 1914) was a Scottish amateur golfer. Doleman tied for ninth place in the 1870 Open Championship.

== Early life ==
Around 1836, Doleman was born in Musselburgh, Scotland. His brothers John, William, and Frank were also golfers.

== Golf career ==
=== 1870 Open Championship ===
The 1870 Open Championship was a golf competition held at Prestwick Golf Club, Ayrshire, Scotland. It was the 11th Open Championship and the last to be contested for the Challenge Belt. Tom Morris, Jr. won the championship by 12 shots from Bob Kirk and Davie Strath. By winning for a third successive time Morris gained permanent possession of the Challenge Belt.

The contest took place the day after the autumn meeting of the club. A notice to prospective tournament entrants read, "On Thurs the 15th Sept. the CHAMPION BELT, given by the Prestwick Golf Club, and open to all Members of Established Golf Clubs and Professionals, will be competed for".

==== Details of play ====
Tommy Morris's first round of 47 (3-5-3-5-6-3-3-3-4-3-4-5) was two shots better than his previous record round in 1868. This gave him a five shot lead over Bob Kirk. After a second round 51 he held a five shot lead over Davie Strath. A final 51 extended his lead to 12 shots. His final score of 149 was 5 shots better than the previous record set in 1868. There were 20 starters but only 17 returned scores. Doleman's collective effort for the tournament resulted in rounds of 57-54-58=169. As an amateur, he was not eligible to receive any prize money.

Morris returned to St. Andrews by train, late on Saturday evening. A "great multitude" were there to meet him and he was carried, shoulder high, to Mr. Leslie's Golf Hotel, where his health was drunk.

== Death ==
Doleman died on 12 September 1914 in Blackpool, Lancashire, England, aged 78.

== Results in The Open Championship ==
Tournament	1869	1870
The Open Championship	WD	T9

Note: Doleman played only in The Open Championship.

Top 10

"T" indicates a tie for a place
