= Men's major golf championships =

Four prestigious annual tournaments in professional golf

The men's major golf championships, commonly known as the major championships, and often referred to simply as the majors, are the most prestigious tournaments in golf. Historically, the national open and amateur championships of the United Kingdom and the United States were regarded as the majors. With the rise of professional golf in the middle of the twentieth century, the majors came to refer to the most prestigious professional tournaments.

In modern men's professional golf, there are four globally recognized major championships. Since 2019, the order of competition dates are as follows:

- Masters Tournament in April; hosted as an invitational by and at Augusta National Golf Club in Augusta, Georgia.
- PGA Championship in May; hosted by the PGA of America and played at various locations in the U.S.
- U.S. Open in June; hosted by the United States Golf Association (USGA) and played at various locations in the U.S.
- The Open Championship in July; hosted by The R&A and played on a links course at various locations in the U.K.

== History ==
The majors originally consisted of two British tournaments, The Open Championship and The Amateur Championship, and two American tournaments, the U.S. Open and the U.S. Amateur. In 1930, Bobby Jones became the only man to win all four in one year, a feat which sportwriters dubbed the "Impregnable Quadrilateral" (George Trevor) and the "Grand Slam" (O. B. Keeler). With the introduction of the Masters Tournament in 1934, and the rise of professional golf in the late 1940s and 1950s, the term "major championships" eventually came to describe the Masters, the U.S. Open, the Open Championship, and the PGA Championship. It is difficult to determine when the definition changed to include the current four tournaments, although many trace it to Arnold Palmer's 1960 season. After winning the Masters and the U.S. Open to start the season, he remarked that if he could win the Open Championship and PGA Championship to finish the season, he would complete "a grand slam of his own" to rival Jones's 1930 feat. Until that time, many U.S. players such as Byron Nelson also considered the Western Open and the North and South Open as two of golf's "majors", and the British PGA Matchplay Championship was as important to British and Commonwealth professionals as the PGA Championship was to Americans.

During the 1950s, the short-lived World Championship of Golf was viewed as a "major" by its competitors, as its first prize was worth almost ten times any other event in the game, and it was the first event whose finale was televised live on U.S. television. The oldest of the majors is The Open Championship, commonly referred to as the "British Open" outside the United Kingdom. Dominated by American champions in the 1920s and 1930s, the comparative explosion in the riches available on the U.S. Tour from the 1940s onwards meant that the lengthy overseas trip needed to qualify and compete in the event became increasingly prohibitive for the leading American professionals. Their regular participation dwindled after the war years. Ben Hogan entered just once in 1953 and won, but never returned. Sam Snead won in 1946 but lost money on the trip (first prize was $600) and did not return until 1962. A voyage to the Open would often clash with the PGA Championship; Hogan's 1953 Open entry came in the years after his 1949 car crash when he skipped the PGA, then a gruelling seven-day matchplay event.

Golf writer Dan Jenkins, who was often seen as the world authority on majors since he had attended more (200+) than anyone else, once noted that "the pros didn't talk much about majors back then. I think it was Herbert Warren Wind who starting using the term. He said golfers had to be judged by the major tournaments they won, but it's not like there was any set number of major tournaments."

In 1960, Arnold Palmer entered The Open Championship in an attempt to emulate Hogan's 1953 feat of winning on his first visit. Though a runner-up by a stroke in his first attempt, Palmer returned and won the next two in 1961 and 1962. Scheduling difficulties persisted with the PGA Championship, but more Americans began competing in the 1960s, restoring the event's prestige (and with it the prize money that once made it an attractive prospect to other American pros). The advent of transatlantic jet travel helped to boost American participation in The Open. A discussion between Palmer and Pittsburgh golf writer Bob Drum led to the concept of the modern Grand Slam of Golf.

In August 2017, after the previous year's edition was scheduled earlier due to golf at the 2016 Summer Olympics, the PGA of America announced that the PGA Championship would be moved to late-May beginning in 2019, in between the Masters and U.S. Open. The PGA Tour concurrently announced that it would move the Players Championship back to March the same year; as a result, the Players and the four majors will still be played across five consecutive months.

== Tournaments ==
The following tournaments are considered Men's Major Championships:

Tournament	Country	Month	Weekend	Location	Organized by	First tournament	Purse	Winner's share
Tournament	Country	Month	Weekend	Location	Organized by	First tournament	in US$ million	
Masters Tournament	United States	April	Weekend ending second Sunday in April	Augusta, Georgia	Augusta National Golf Club	1934	21	4.2
PGA Championship	United States	May	One week before U.S. Memorial Day weekend	various	PGA of America	1916	19	3.42
U.S. Open	United States	June	Weekend ending third Sunday in June, or U.S. Father's Day	various	United States Golf Association	1895	21.5	4.3
The Open Championship	United Kingdom	July	Week containing the third Friday in July	various (selected links courses within the rotation)	The R&A	1860	17.0	3.1

=== Masters Tournament ===
The Masters Tournament (sometimes referred to as the U.S. Masters), the season's first major championship, is the only major that is played at the same course every year (Augusta National Golf Club), being the invitational tournament of that club. First staged in 1934 as the "Augusta National Invitation Tournament" (formally adopting its present name in 1939), it is the most recent men's major championship to be founded.

The Masters invites the smallest field of the majors, generally under 100 players (although, like all the majors, it now ensures entry for all golfers among the world's top 50 before the event), and is the only one of the four majors that does not use "alternates" to replace qualified players who do not enter the event (usually due to injury). Also, its 36-hole cut is set at roughly the top 50 players and ties—the smallest of any major, though not the smallest when measured by percentage of the original field. Former champions have a lifetime invitation to compete, and also included in the field are the current champions of the major amateur championships, and most of the previous year's PGA Tour winners (although winners of "alternate" events held opposite a high-profile tournament, and as of 2026, winners of FedEx Cup Fall events held after the Tour Championship, do not receive automatic invitations).

The traditions of Augusta during Tournament week, such as the Champion's Dinner, Par 3 Contest, and awarding of a green jacket to the champion, create a distinctive character for the tournament, as does the course itself, with its lack of primary rough but severely undulating fairways and greens, traditional pin placements, and punitive use of ponds and creeks on several key holes on the back nine (which the club calls the "second nine").

=== PGA Championship ===
The PGA Championship (sometimes referred to as the U.S. PGA), which since 2019 has been the year's second major, was established in 1916 and is traditionally played at a parkland club in the United States. The courses chosen tend to be as difficult as those chosen for the U.S. Open, with several, such as Baltusrol Golf Club, Medinah Country Club, Oakland Hills Country Club, Oak Hill Country Club, and Winged Foot Golf Club, having hosted both. The PGA generally does not set up the course to be as difficult as the USGA does. The PGA of America enters into a profit-sharing agreement with the host club. An exception was in 2014, when the tournament was held at Valhalla Golf Club in Louisville, Kentucky, a club that the PGA of America fully owned at the time.

As with The Masters, previous winners of the PGA Championship have a lifetime invitation to compete. As well as inviting recent champions of the other three professional majors and leading players from the world rankings, the PGA Championship field is completed by qualifiers held among members of the PGA of America, the organization of club and teaching professionals that are separate from the members of the PGA Tour. The PGA Championship is also the only one of the four majors to invite all winners of PGA Tour events in the year preceding the tournament, as well as inviting 20 club professionals who are non-tour regulars. Amateur golfers do not normally play on the PGA Tour, and could only qualify by winning one of the other three majors, winning a PGA Tour event while playing under a sponsor's exemption, or having a high world ranking.

When the PGA Championship was held in August, it was frequently affected by the high heat and humidity that characterize the summer climate of much of the U.S., which often set it apart as a challenge from (in particular) the Open Championship, an event often played in cooler and rainy weather. With the 2019 move to a May date, heat and humidity are less likely to have major effects on the competition.

=== U.S. Open ===
The third major, the U.S. Open, was first played in 1895 and is notorious for being played on difficult courses that have tight fairways, challenging greens, demanding pin positions and thick and high rough, placing a great premium on accuracy, especially with driving and approach play. Additionally, while most regular tour events are played on courses with par 72, the U.S. Open has almost never been held on a par-72 course in recent decades; the 2017 event was the first since 1992 to be played at par 72. During this time, the tournament course has occasionally been played to a par of 71 but most commonly par 70. The U.S. Open is rarely won with a score much under par.

The event is the championship of the United States Golf Association, and in having a very strict exempt qualifiers list – made up of recent major champions, professionals currently ranked high in the world rankings or on the previous year's money lists around the world, and leading amateurs from recent USGA events – about half of the 156-person field still enters the tournament through two rounds of open qualification events, mostly held in the U.S. but also in Europe and Japan. The U.S. Open has no barrier to entry for either women or junior players, as long as they are a professional or meet amateur handicap requirements. As of 2024, however, no female golfer has yet qualified for the U.S. Open, although in 2006 Michelle Wie made it to the second qualifying stage. Finally, the U.S. Open has the strictest 36-hole cut of any major championship (by percentage of the field), with only the top 60 players and ties of the 156-player field playing the final two days.

While the U.S. Open employed an 18-hole playoff for many years if players were tied after four rounds, the USGA announced that beginning in 2018 all of its future championships would implement a two-hole aggregate playoff format. A sudden-death playoff would follow if the players were still tied after the two playoff holes. This change also brought the U.S. Open more in line with both the Open and PGA Championships, which use three-hole aggregate playoffs (the Open previously used a four-hole playoff from 1989 to 2018 before reducing to the current three-hole playoff in 2019), followed by sudden death if necessary, and most regular events as well as the Masters only have simple sudden-death playoffs. The Sunday of the Championship has also in recent years fallen on Father's Day (at least as recognized in the US and the UK) which has lent added poignancy to winners' speeches.

=== The Open Championship ===
The year's final major, The Open Championship (sometimes referred to as the British Open), is organized by The R&A, an offshoot of The Royal and Ancient Golf Club of St Andrews, and is typically played on a links-style course in the United Kingdom (primarily Scotland or England) according to the tournament's official course rotation. First contested in 1860, it carries the prestige of being the oldest professional golf tournament currently in existence and the original "Open" championship (although the very first event was held only for British professionals). It is respected for maintaining the tradition of links play that dates back to the very invention of the game in Scotland. Links courses are generally typified as coastal, flat and often very windswept, with the fairways cut through dune grass and gorse bushes that make up the "rough", and have deep bunkers. The course is generally not "doctored" to make it more difficult, effectively making the variable weather the main external influence on the field's score. Also, the greens at Open venues tend to be set up to play more slowly than those of normal tour stops. In windy conditions, a course with fast greens can become unplayable because the wind could affect balls at rest; the third round of the 2015 Open saw many delays for this very reason.

As well as exempting from qualifying recent professional major and amateur champions, all former Open Championship winners under age 60 (with the age cutoff being reduced to 55 for those winning their first Open in 2024 or later), and leading players from the world rankings, the R&A ensures that leading golfers from around the globe are given the chance to enter by holding qualifying events on all continents, as well as holding final qualifying events around the UK in the weeks before the main tournament.

The champion receives (and has his name inscribed on the base of) the famous Claret Jug, a trophy that dates back to 1872 (champions from 1860 until 1871 received instead a championship belt, much like a champion professional boxer's belt nowadays) and the engraving of the champions' name on the trophy before them receiving it is, in itself, one of the traditions of the closing ceremony of the championship, as is the award of the silver medal to the leading amateur player to have made the cut to play the last 36 holes.

== Significance ==
The four majors are golf's most prestigious events. Elite players from all over the world participate in them, and the reputations of the greatest players in golf history are largely based on the number and variety of major championship victories they accumulate. Winning a major boosts a player's career far more than winning any other tournament. If he is already a leading player, he will probably receive large bonuses from his sponsors and may be able to negotiate better contracts. If he is an unknown, he will immediately be signed up. Perhaps more importantly, he will receive an exemption from the need to annually re-qualify for a tour card on his home tour, thus giving a tournament golfer some security in an unstable profession. He also is automatically invited to every other major championship for the next five years, and receives an exemption into the major he just won as well; depending on the major won, he can receive at minimum a 10-year exemption, and at maximum a lifetime exemption into the major. Currently, both the PGA Tour and European Tour give a five-year exemption to all major winners and they receive the highest priority in those rankings.

Independent organizations, and not the PGA Tour, operate each of the majors. Three of the four majors take place in the United States. The Masters is played at the same course, Augusta National Golf Club, every year, while the other three rotate courses (the Open Championship, however, is always played on a links course). Each of the majors has a distinct history, and they are run by four separate golf organizations, but their special status is recognized worldwide. Major championship winners receive the maximum possible allocation of 100 points from the Official World Golf Ranking, which is endorsed by all of the main tours, and major championship prize money is official on the three richest regular (i.e. under-50) golf tours, the PGA Tour, European Tour and Japan Golf Tour.

The top prizes of each of the majors are not actually the largest in golf, being surpassed by The Players Championship, three of the four World Golf Championships events (the HSBC Champions, promoted to WGC status in 2009, has a top prize comparable to that of the majors), and some other invitational events. The Players Championship historically has offered a prize pool as large as or larger than the majors, because the PGA Tour wants its most important event to be as attractive. Although the majors are considered prestigious due to their history and traditions, besides The Players there are still other non-"major" tournaments which prominently feature top players competing for purses meeting or exceeding those of the four traditional majors, such as the European Tour's DP World Tour Championship, Dubai, and World Golf Championships. With its large prize fund of any golf event and role as PGA Tour's flagship tournament, The Players is frequently considered to be an unofficial "fifth major" by players and critics. After the announcement that the Evian Masters would be recognized as the fifth women's major by the LPGA Tour, players objected to the concept of having a fifth men's major, owing to the long-standing traditions that the existing four have established.

== Television coverage ==
=== United Kingdom ===
Event	Networks
Masters Tournament	Sky Sports
PGA Championship	Sky Sports
U.S. Open	Sky Sports
The Open Championship	Sky Sports

In the United Kingdom, historically all four majors were broadcast on free to air TV. ITV has not broadcast live golf for many years. The BBC used to be the exclusive TV home of the Masters Tournament, U.S. Open and the Open Championship. By the early years of the first decade of the 21st century, only the Masters and Open Championship were broadcast live on the BBC. From 2011 onwards Sky Sports has exclusive live coverage of the first two days of the Masters, with the weekend rounds shared with the BBC. The U.S. Open is shown exclusively on Sky Sports. Beginning in 2016, Sky Sports also became the exclusive broadcaster of the Open Championship; the BBC elected to forego the final year of its contract. The BBC continues to hold rights to broadcast a nightly highlights programme.

Sky also held rights to the PGA Championship, but in July 2017, it was reported that the PGA of America had declined to renew its contract, seeking a different media model for the tournament in the United Kingdom. The 2017 tournament was aired by the BBC (via BBC Red Button, with the conclusion of coverage on BBC Two) and streamed by GiveMeSport (via Facebook Live). Eleven Sports UK & Ireland acquired the event for 2018, as one of the first events covered by the newly launched streaming service.

=== United States ===
Event	Networks
Masters Tournament	ESPN/CBS
PGA Championship	ESPN/CBS
U.S. Open	USA Network/NBC
The Open Championship	USA Network/NBC

As none of the majors fall under the direct jurisdiction of tours, broadcast rights for these events are negotiated separately with each sanctioning body. However, as of 2020, network television coverage of all four tournaments is split equally between the PGA Tour's two main television partners, CBS and NBC.

The Masters operates under one-year contracts; CBS has been the main TV partner every year since 1956, with ESPN broadcasting CBS-produced coverage of the first and second rounds since 2008 (replacing USA Network, which had shown the event since the early 1980s).

Beginning in 1966, ABC obtained the broadcast rights for the other three majors and held them for a quarter century. The PGA Championship moved to CBS in 1991 and the U.S. Open returned to NBC in 1995. ABC retained The Open Championship as its sole major, but moved its live coverage on the weekend to sister cable network ESPN in 2010. In June 2015, it was announced that NBC and Golf Channel would acquire rights to the Open Championship under a 12-year deal. While the NBC deal was originally to take effect in 2017, ESPN chose to opt out of its final year of Open rights, so the NBC contract took effect beginning in 2016 instead.

As of 2020, NBC and Golf Channel hold broadcast rights to the U.S. Open and other USGA events, replacing Fox Sports — which had assumed the rights in 2015 under a 12-year contract, but withdrew and sold the remainder of the rights to NBC in June 2020.

As of 2020, CBS and ESPN hold the broadcast rights to the PGA Championship, under a new contract that replaces TNT as the tournament's cable partner.

In November 2021, NBC announced that early round and early-weekend coverage of the U.S. Open and the Open Championship would move from Golf Channel to USA Network beginning in 2022.

== Major championship winners ==
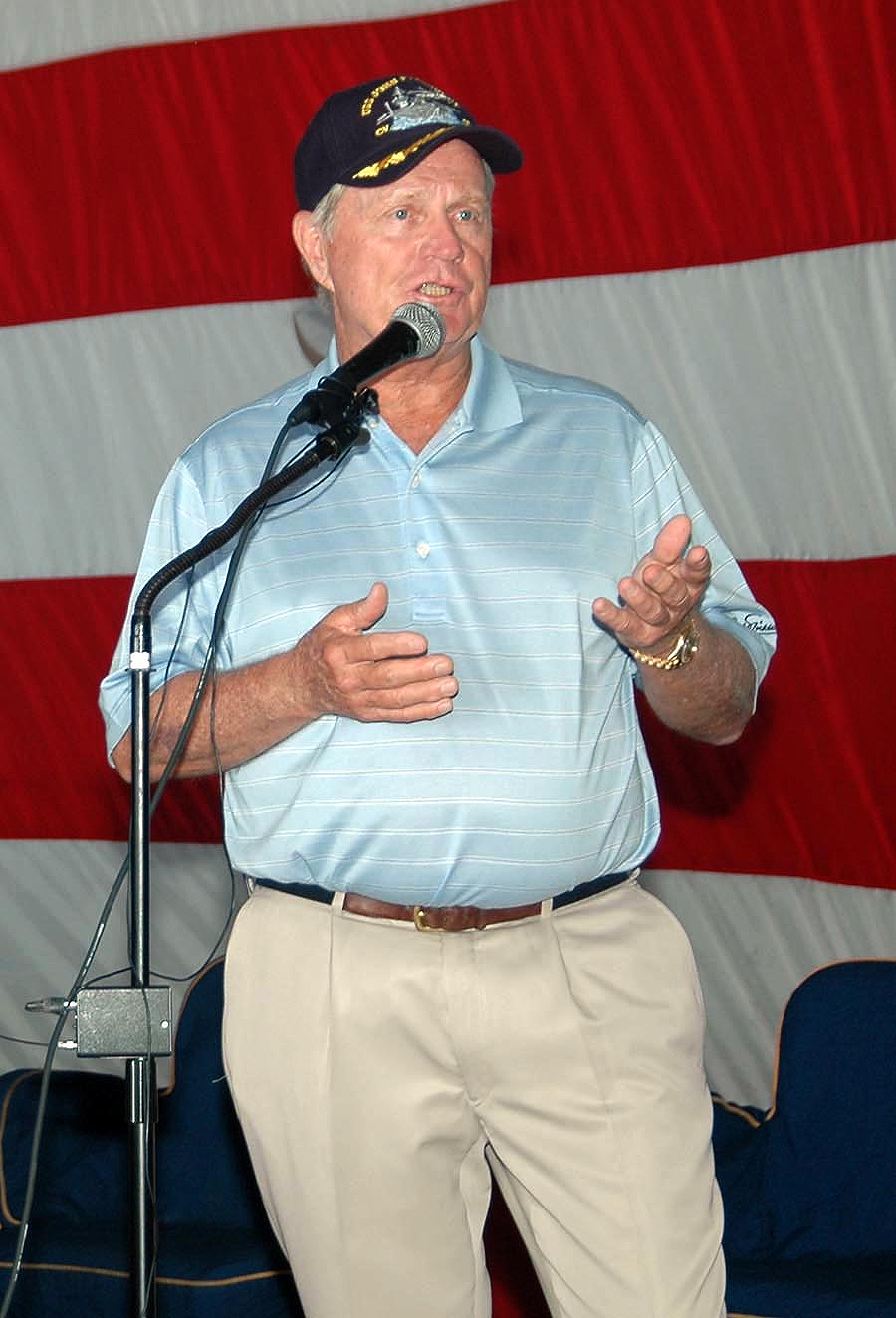
Jack Nicklaus won a record 18 major championships.

== Records ==
=== Scoring records ===
==== Winning total (aggregate) ====
The aggregate scoring records for each major are tabulated below, listed in order of when the majors are scheduled annually.

Date	Tournament	Player	Rounds	Score	To par
Nov 15, 2020	Masters Tournament	(United States) Dustin Johnson	65-70-65-68	268	−20
May 19, 2024	PGA Championship	(United States) Xander Schauffele	62-68-68-65	263	−21
Jun 19, 2011	U.S. Open	(Northern Ireland) Rory McIlroy	65-66-68-69	268	−16
Jul 17, 2016	The Open Championship	(Sweden) Henrik Stenson	68-65-68-63	264	−20

==== Winning total (to par) ====
The scoring records to par for each major are tabulated below, listed in order of when the majors are scheduled annually.

Date	Tournament	Player	Rounds	Score	To par
Nov 15, 2020	Masters Tournament	(United States) Dustin Johnson	65-70-65-68	268	−20
May 19, 2024	PGA Championship	(United States) Xander Schauffele	62-68-68-65	263	−21
Jun 19, 2011	U.S. Open	(Northern Ireland) Rory McIlroy	65-66-68-69	268	−16
Jun 18, 2017	U.S. Open	(United States) Brooks Koepka	67-70-68-67	272	−16
Jul 17, 2016	The Open Championship	(Sweden) Henrik Stenson	68-65-68-63	264	−20
Jul 17, 2022	The Open Championship	(Australia) Cameron Smith	67-64-73-64	268	−20

==== Largest margins of victory ====
Major championships have been won by a margin of nine strokes or greater on eight occasions. On a further eight occasions, majors have been won by a margin of eight strokes; this includes Rory McIlroy's victory in the 2012 PGA Championship at the Kiawah Island Golf Resort, which is the PGA Championship event record.

Nationality	Player	Margin	Major	Course
United States	Tiger Woods	15	2000 U.S. Open	Pebble Beach
Scotland	Old Tom Morris	13	1862 Open Championship	Prestwick
Scotland	Young Tom Morris	12	1870 Open Championship	Prestwick
United States	Tiger Woods	12	1997 Masters	Augusta National
Scotland	Young Tom Morris	11	1869 Open Championship	Prestwick
Scotland	Willie Smith	11	1899 U.S. Open	Baltimore
England	Jim Barnes	9	1921 U.S. Open	Columbia
United States	Jack Nicklaus	9	1965 Masters	Augusta National

==== Single round records ====
The record for a single round in a major championship is 62, which was first recorded by South African golfer Branden Grace in the third round of the 2017 Open Championship and equaled by Americans Rickie Fowler and Xander Schauffele in the first round of the 2023 U.S. Open. Schauffele hit another 62 in the first round of the 2024 PGA Championship. In the third round of that same tournament, Shane Lowry became the fourth player to record a 62 at a major championship after missing a birdie putt on the 18th hole that was for a 61.

=== Consecutive wins in the same major ===
Nationality	Player	Major	#	Years
Scotland	Young Tom Morris	The Open Championship	4	1868, 1869, 1870, 1872^{[a]}
United States	Walter Hagen	PGA Championship	4	1924, 1925, 1926, 1927
Scotland	Jamie Anderson	The Open Championship	3	1877, 1878, 1879
Scotland	Bob Ferguson	The Open Championship	3	1880, 1881, 1882
Scotland	Willie Anderson	U.S. Open	3	1903, 1904, 1905
Australia	Peter Thomson	The Open Championship	3	1954, 1955, 1956
Scotland	Old Tom Morris	The Open Championship	2	1861, 1862
Jersey	Harry Vardon	The Open Championship	2	1898, 1899
Scotland	James Braid	The Open Championship	2	1905, 1906
England	John Henry Taylor	The Open Championship	2	1894, 1895
United States	John McDermott	U.S. Open	2	1911, 1912
England	Jim Barnes	PGA Championship	2	1916, 1919^{[a]}
United States	Gene Sarazen	PGA Championship	2	1922, 1923
United States	Bobby Jones	The Open Championship	2	1926, 1927
United States	Walter Hagen	The Open Championship	2	1928, 1929
United States	Leo Diegel	PGA Championship	2	1928, 1929
United States	Bobby Jones	U.S. Open	2	1929, 1930
United States	Denny Shute	PGA Championship	2	1936, 1937
United States	Ralph Guldahl	U.S. Open	2	1937, 1938
South Africa	Bobby Locke	The Open Championship	2	1949, 1950
United States	Ben Hogan	U.S. Open	2	1950, 1951
United States	Arnold Palmer	The Open Championship	2	1961, 1962
United States	Jack Nicklaus	Masters Tournament	2	1965, 1966
United States	Lee Trevino	The Open Championship	2	1971, 1972
United States	Tom Watson	The Open Championship	2	1982, 1983
United States	Curtis Strange	U.S. Open	2	1988, 1989
England	Nick Faldo	Masters Tournament	2	1989, 1990
United States	Tiger Woods	PGA Championship	2	1999, 2000
United States	Tiger Woods	Masters Tournament	2	2001, 2002
United States	Tiger Woods	The Open Championship	2	2005, 2006
United States	Tiger Woods	PGA Championship (2)	2	2006, 2007
Ireland	Pádraig Harrington	The Open Championship	2	2007, 2008
United States	Brooks Koepka	U.S. Open	2	2017, 2018
United States	Brooks Koepka	PGA Championship	2	2018, 2019
Northern Ireland	Rory McIlroy	Masters Tournament	2	2025, 2026

^{a} These are consecutive because there was no Open Championship in 1871 and no PGA Championship in 1917 and 1918.

=== Wire-to-wire victories ===
Players who have led or been tied for the lead after each round of a major.

- Outright leader after every round

Nationality	Player	Year	Major
Jersey	Ted Ray	1912	Open
United States	Walter Hagen	1914	U.S.
England	Jim Barnes	1921	U.S.
United States	Bobby Jones	1927	Open
United States	Gene Sarazen	1932	Open
England	Henry Cotton	1934	Open
United States	Craig Wood	1941	Masters
United States	Ben Hogan	1953	U.S.
United States	Arnold Palmer	1960	Masters
United States	Bobby Nichols	1964	PGA
England	Tony Jacklin	1970	U.S.
United States	Jack Nicklaus	1971	PGA
United States	Jack Nicklaus	1972	Masters
United States	Tom Weiskopf	1973	Open
United States	Raymond Floyd	1976	Masters
United States	Raymond Floyd	1982	PGA
United States	Hal Sutton	1983	PGA
United States	Tiger Woods	2000	U.S.
United States	Tiger Woods	2002	U.S.
United States	Tiger Woods	2005	Open
Northern Ireland	Rory McIlroy	2011	U.S.
Germany	Martin Kaymer	2014	U.S.
Northern Ireland	Rory McIlroy	2014	Open
United States	Jordan Spieth	2015	Masters
United States	Brooks Koepka	2019	PGA

- At least tied for the lead at the end of every round

Nationality	Player	Year	Major
Scotland	Willie Anderson	1903	U.S.
Scotland	Alex Smith	1906	U.S.
United States	Chick Evans	1916	U.S.
United States	Tommy Bolt	1958	U.S.
United States	Arnold Palmer	1964	Masters
United States	Raymond Floyd	1969	PGA
United States	Jack Nicklaus	1972	U.S.
United States	Hubert Green	1977	U.S.
Spain	Seve Ballesteros	1980	Masters
United States	Jack Nicklaus	1980	U.S.
United States	Payne Stewart	1991	U.S.
Zimbabwe	Nick Price	1994	PGA
United States	Tiger Woods	2000	PGA
South Africa	Retief Goosen	2001	U.S.
United States	Phil Mickelson	2005	PGA
South Africa	Trevor Immelman	2008	Masters
United States	Jimmy Walker	2016	PGA
United States	Jordan Spieth	2017	Open
United States	Dustin Johnson	2020	Masters
United States	Xander Schauffele	2024	PGA
Northern Ireland	Rory McIlroy	2026	Masters
United States	Wyndham Clark	2026	U.S. Open

=== Top ten finishes in all four modern majors in one season ===
It was rare, before the early 1960s, for the leading players from around the world to have the opportunity to compete in all four of the "modern" majors in one season, because of the different qualifying criteria used in each at the time, the costs of traveling to compete (in an era when tournament prize money was very low, and only the champion himself would earn the chance of ongoing endorsements), and on occasion even the conflicting scheduling of the Open and PGA Championships. In 1937, the U.S. Ryder Cup side all competed in The Open Championship, but of those who finished in the top ten of that event, only Ed Dudley could claim a "top ten" finish in all four of the majors in 1937, if his defeat in the last-16 round of that year's PGA Championship (then at match play) was considered a "joint 9th" position.

Following 1960, when Arnold Palmer's narrowly failed bid to add the Open Championship to his Masters and U.S. Open titles (and thus emulate Hogan's 1953 "triple crown") helped to establish the concept of the modern professional "Grand Slam", it has become commonplace for the leading players to be invited to, and indeed compete in, all four majors each year. Even so, those who have recorded top-ten finishes in all four, in a single year, remains a small and select group.

Nationality	Player	Year	Wins	Major championship results				Lowest placing
Nationality	Player	Year	Wins	Masters	U.S. Open	Open Ch.	PGA Ch.	Lowest placing
United States	Ed Dudley	1937	0^	3	5	6	R16	R16
United States	Arnold Palmer	1960	2	1	1	2	T7	T7
South Africa	Gary Player	1963	0	T5	T8	T7	T8	T8
United States	Arnold Palmer (2)	1966	0	T4	2	T8	T6	T8
United States	Doug Sanders	1966	0^	T4	T8	T2	T6	T8
United States	Miller Barber	1969	0^	7	T6	10	T5	10
United States	Jack Nicklaus	1971	1	T2	2	T5	1	T5
United States	Jack Nicklaus (2)	1973	1	T3	T4	4	1	T4
United States	Jack Nicklaus (3)	1974	0	T4	T10	3	2	T10
South Africa	Gary Player (2)	1974	2	1	T8	1	7	T8
United States	Hale Irwin	1975	0	T4	T3	T9	T5	T9
United States	Jack Nicklaus (4)	1975	2	1	T7	T3	1	T7
United States	Tom Watson	1975	1	T8	T9	1	9	T9
United States	Jack Nicklaus (5)	1977	0	2	T10	2	3	T10
United States	Tom Watson (2)	1977	2	1	T7	1	T6	T7
United States	Tom Watson (3)	1982	2	T5	1	1	T9	T9
United States	Ben Crenshaw	1987	0	T4	T4	T4	T7	T7
United States	Tiger Woods	2000	3	5	1	1	1	5
Spain	Sergio García	2002	0	8	4	T8	10	10
South Africa	Ernie Els	2004	0	2	T9	2	T4	T9
United States	Phil Mickelson	2004	1	1	2	3	T6	T6
Fiji	Vijay Singh	2005	0	T5	T6	T5	T10	T10
United States	Tiger Woods (2)	2005	2	1	2	1	T4	T4
United States	Rickie Fowler	2014	0^	T5	T2	T2	T3	T5
United States	Jordan Spieth	2015	2	1	1	T4	2	T4
United States	Brooks Koepka	2019	1	T2	2	T4	1	T4
Spain	Jon Rahm	2021	1	T5	1	T3	T8	T8
Northern Ireland	Rory McIlroy	2022	0	2	T5	3	8	8
United States	Xander Schauffele	2024	2	8	T7	1	1	8
United States	Scottie Scheffler	2025	2	4	T7	1	1	T7

^ Never won a regular tour major championship in his career.

On 14 of the 30 occasions the feat has been achieved, the player in question did not win a major that year – indeed, three of the players (Dudley, Sanders and Barber) failed to win a major championship in their careers (although Barber would go on to win five senior majors), and Fowler has also yet to win one.

=== Multiple victories in a calendar year ===
==== Four ====
- 1930: (United States) Bobby Jones; The Open Championship, U.S. Open, U.S. Amateur Championship, The Amateur Championship

==== Three ====
- 1953: (United States) Ben Hogan; Masters Tournament, U.S. Open, and The Open Championship; he was unable to play in both the Open Championship and the PGA Championship because the dates effectively overlapped.
- 2000: (United States) Tiger Woods; U.S. Open, The Open Championship, and PGA Championship

==== Two ====
===== Masters and U.S. Open =====
- 1941: (United States) Craig Wood
- 1951: (United States) Ben Hogan
- 1960: (United States) Arnold Palmer
- 1972: (United States) Jack Nicklaus
- 2002: (United States) Tiger Woods
- 2015: (United States) Jordan Spieth

===== Masters and Open Championship =====
- 1962: (United States) Arnold Palmer
- 1966: (United States) Jack Nicklaus
- 1974: (South Africa) Gary Player
- 1977: (United States) Tom Watson
- 1990: (England) Nick Faldo
- 1998: (United States) Mark O'Meara
- 2005: (United States) Tiger Woods

===== Masters and PGA Championship =====
- 1949: (United States) Sam Snead
- 1956: (United States) Jack Burke Jr
- 1963: (United States) Jack Nicklaus
- 1975: (United States) Jack Nicklaus

===== U.S. Open and Open Championship =====
- 1926: (United States) Bobby Jones
- 1932: (United States) Gene Sarazen
- 1971: (United States) Lee Trevino
- 1982: (United States) Tom Watson

===== U.S. Open and PGA Championship =====
- 1922: (United States) Gene Sarazen
- 1948: (United States) Ben Hogan
- 1980: (United States) Jack Nicklaus
- 2018: (United States) Brooks Koepka

===== Open Championship and PGA Championship =====
- 1924: (United States) Walter Hagen
- 1994: (Zimbabwe) Nick Price
- 2006: (United States) Tiger Woods
- 2008: (Republic of Ireland) Pádraig Harrington
- 2014: (Northern Ireland) Rory McIlroy
- 2024: (United States) Xander Schauffele
- 2025: (United States) Scottie Scheffler

=== Wins in consecutive majors ===
==== Four ====
- 1868–1872: (Scotland) Young Tom Morris 1868 Open, 1869 Open, 1870 Open, 1872 Open (No Open Championship played in 1871)
- 1930: (United States) Bobby Jones 1930 Amateur, 1930 Open, 1930 U.S. Open, 1930 U.S. Amateur
- 2000–01: (United States) Tiger Woods 2000 U.S. Open, 2000 Open, 2000 PGA, 2001 Masters

==== Three ====
- 1877–1879: (Scotland) Jamie Anderson 1877 Open, 1878 Open, 1879 Open
- 1880–1882: (Scotland) Bob Ferguson 1880 Open, 1881 Open, 1882 Open

==== Two ====
Note: The order in which the majors were contested varied between 1895 and 1953. Before 1916, the PGA Championship did not exist; Before 1934, the Masters did not exist. From 1954 through 2018, the order of the majors was Masters, U.S. Open, Open Championship, PGA except in 1971, when the PGA was played before the Masters. From 2019, the order has been Masters, PGA, U.S. Open, Open Championship.

- 1861–62: (Scotland) Old Tom Morris 1861 Open, 1862 Open
- 1894–95: (England) J.H. Taylor 1894 Open, 1895 Open
- 1920–21: (Scotland) Jock Hutchison 1920 PGA, 1921 Open (The Open Championship was the first major contested in 1921)
- 1921–22: (United States) Walter Hagen 1921 PGA, 1922 Open (The Open Championship was the first major contested in 1922)
- 1922: (United States) Gene Sarazen 1922 U.S. Open, 1922 PGA
- 1924: (United States) Walter Hagen 1924 Open, 1924 PGA
- 1926: (United States) Bobby Jones 1926 Open, 1926 U.S. Open (The Open Championship was played before the U.S. Open in 1926)
- 1927–28: (United States) Walter Hagen 1927 PGA, 1928 Open (The Open Championship was the first major contested in 1928)
- 1930–31: (Scotland) Tommy Armour 1930 PGA, 1931 Open (The Open Championship was the first major contested in 1931)
- 1932: (United States) Gene Sarazen 1932 Open, 1932 U.S. Open (The Open Championship was the first major contested in 1932, followed by the U.S. Open)
- 1941: (United States) Craig Wood 1941 Masters, 1941 U.S. Open
- 1948: (United States) Ben Hogan 1948 PGA, 1948 U.S. Open (The PGA was played between the Masters and U.S. Open in 1948)
- 1949: (United States) Sam Snead 1949 Masters, 1949 PGA (As in 1948, the 1949 PGA was played between the Masters and U.S. Open)
- 1951: (United States) Ben Hogan 1951 Masters, 1951 U.S. Open
- 1953: (United States) Ben Hogan; 1953 Masters, 1953 U.S. Open (The 1953 Open Championship, also won by Hogan, was actually concluded only 3 days after 1953 PGA; he chose not to play in the PGA because of the strain on his legs, and the conflict with the Open championship.)
- 1960: (United States) Arnold Palmer 1960 Masters, 1960 U.S. Open
- 1971: (United States) Lee Trevino 1971 U.S. Open, 1971 Open
- 1972: (United States) Jack Nicklaus 1972 Masters, 1972 U.S. Open (The 1971 PGA, also won by Nicklaus, was not consecutive due to being played before the Masters in 1971)
- 1982: (United States) Tom Watson 1982 U.S. Open, 1982 Open
- 1994: (Zimbabwe) Nick Price 1994 Open, 1994 PGA
- 2002: (United States) Tiger Woods 2002 Masters, 2002 U.S. Open
- 2005–06: (United States) Phil Mickelson 2005 PGA, 2006 Masters
- 2006: (United States) Tiger Woods 2006 Open, 2006 PGA
- 2008: (Republic of Ireland) Pádraig Harrington 2008 Open, 2008 PGA
- 2014: (Northern Ireland) Rory McIlroy 2014 Open, 2014 PGA
- 2015: (United States) Jordan Spieth 2015 Masters, 2015 U.S. Open

=== Most runner-up finishes ===
For the purposes of this section a runner-up is defined as someone who either (i) tied for the lead after 72 holes (or 36 holes in the case of the early championships) but lost the playoff or (ii) finished alone or in a tie for second place. In a few instances players have been involved in a playoff for the win or for second place prize money and have ended up taking the third prize (e.g. 1870 Open Championship, 1966 Masters Tournament). For match play PGA Championships up to 1957 the runner-up is the losing finalist.

Along with his record 18 major victories, Jack Nicklaus also holds the record for most runner-up finishes in major championships, with 19, including a record 7 at the Open Championship. Phil Mickelson has the second most with 12 runner-up finishes after the 2023 Masters, which includes a record 6 runner-up finishes at the U.S. Open, the one major he has never won. Nicklaus and Mickelson are the only golfers with multiple runner-up finishes in all four majors. Arnold Palmer had 10 second places, including 3 in the major he never won, the PGA Championship. There have been three golfers with 8 runner-up finishes – Sam Snead, Greg Norman and Tom Watson. Norman shares the distinction of having lost playoffs in each of the four majors with Craig Wood (who lost the 1934 PGA final – at match play – on the second extra hole).

- (United States) Jack Nicklaus: 19 (1960–1983)
- (United States) Phil Mickelson: 12 (1999–2023)
- (United States) Arnold Palmer: 10 (1960–1970)
- (United States) Sam Snead: 8 (1937–1957)
- (Australia) Greg Norman: 8 (1984–1996)
- (United States) Tom Watson: 8 (1978–2009)
- (England) J. H. Taylor: 7 (1896–1914)
- (United States) Tiger Woods: 7 (2002–2018)

==== Most runner-up finishes without a victory ====
- (Scotland) Colin Montgomerie 5: U.S. Open 1994, 1997, 2006; Open 2005; PGA 1995
- (England) / (United States) Harry Cooper 4: U.S. Open 1927, 1936; Masters 1936, 1938
- (United States) Doug Sanders 4: U.S. Open 1961; Open 1966, 1970; PGA 1959
- (Australia) Bruce Crampton 4: Masters 1972; U.S. Open 1972; PGA 1973, 1975^{[a]}

^{a} Crampton was second to Jack Nicklaus on each occasion.

=== Most appearances ===
Starts	Name	Country	Wins	Span
164	Jack Nicklaus	United States	18	1957–2005
150	Gary Player	South Africa	9	1956–2009
145	Tom Watson	United States	8	1970–2016
142	Arnold Palmer	United States	7	1953–2004
129	Phil Mickelson	United States	6	1990–2025
127	Raymond Floyd	United States	4	1963–2009
118	Sam Snead	United States	7	1937–1983
117	Ben Crenshaw	United States	2	1970–2015
115	Gene Sarazen	United States	7	1920–1976
112	Bernhard Langer	Germany	2	1976–2025
110	Mark O'Meara	United States	2	1980–2018
109	Tom Kite	United States	1	1970–2004
108	Ernie Els	South Africa	4	1989–2024
107	Fred Couples	United States	1	1979–2026
103	Sergio García	Spain	1	1996–2026
102	Adam Scott	Australia	1	2000–2026
102	Vijay Singh	Fiji	3	1989–2026
101	Davis Love III	United States	1	1986–2020
101	Sandy Lyle	Scotland	2	1974–2023
100	Nick Faldo	England	6	1976–2015

Lee Westwood holds the record for the most major championship appearances without a victory, with 92 starts.

== See also ==
- Chronological list of men's major golf champions
- List of men's major championships winning golfers
- Triple Crown of Golf
- Women's major golf championships

== Sources ==
- Gruver, Ed (October 2024). The Wee Ice Mon Cometh: Ben Hogan's 1953 Triple Slam and One of Golf's Greatest Summers. U of Nebraska Press. pp. 193–194. ISBN 978-1-4962-3898-6.
