= Hugh Brown (golfer) =

Scottish golfer

Personal information
- Nationality: Scotland
- Born: c. 1850 Scotland

Career
- Sport: Golf
- Turned professional: c. 1867

Best results in major championships
- Masters Tournament: DNP
- PGA Championship: DNP
- U.S. Open: DNP
- The Open Championship: 7th: 1872

Hugh Brown (born c. 1850, date of death unknown) was a Scottish professional golfer who played during the late 19th century. He finished seventh in the 1872 Open Championship.

== Early life ==
Brown was born in Scotland, circa 1850.

== Golf career ==
=== 1872 Open Championship ===
The 1872 Open Championship was the 12th Open Championship, held 13 September at Prestwick Golf Club in Prestwick, South Ayrshire, Scotland. There were only 8 competitors and the contest started at 10 a.m. There was a strong wind all day which made for difficult playing conditions.

Tom Morris, Jr. won the Championship for the fourth consecutive time, by three strokes from runner-up Davie Strath, having been five shots behind Strath before the final round. He was just 21 years and 146 days old. Brown shot rounds of 65-73-61=199 and finished in seventh place.
