= William Hunter (golfer) =

Scottish golfer

Personal information
- Nationality: Scotland
- Born: c. 1850 Scotland

Career
- Sport: Golf
- Status: Amateur

Best results in major championships
- Masters Tournament: DNP
- PGA Championship: DNP
- U.S. Open: DNP
- The Open Championship: 8th: 1872

William Hunter (born c. 1850) was a Scottish amateur golfer. He placed eighth in the 1872 Open Championship.

== Career ==
Hunter was born in Scotland circa 1850.

The 1872 Open Championship was the 12th Open Championship, held on 13 September at Prestwick Golf Club in Prestwick, South Ayrshire, Scotland. Tom Morris, Jr. won the Championship for the fourth consecutive time, by three strokes from the runner-up Davie Strath, having been five shots behind Strath before the final round. He was just 21 years and 146 days old.

Hunter carded rounds of 65-63-74=202 and finished in eighth place.

Hunter's date of death is unknown, as is his date of birth.

== Results in major championships ==
Tournament	1872	1873	1874	1875	1876	1877	1878
The Open Championship	8						20

Note: Hunter played only in The Open Championship.

Top 10
Did not play
