= William Doleman =

Scottish amateur golfer (1838–1918)

Personal information
- Nationality: Scotland
- Born: 16 September 1838 Musselburgh, Scotland
- Died: 8 July 1918 (aged 79) Glasgow, Scotland

Career
- Sport: Golf
- Status: Amateur

Best results in major championships
- Masters Tournament: DNP
- PGA Championship: DNP
- U.S. Open: DNP
- The Open Championship: 3rd: 1872

William Doleman (16 September 1838 – 8 July 1918) was a Scottish amateur golfer. Doleman placed sixth in the 1865 Open Championship. He placed fifth in the 1869 Open Championship and was third in the 1872 Open Championship. He is reputed to have been the first person to have played golf in Canada when he visited as a sailor in 1854.

He was a regular competitor in The Amateur Championship from its foundation in 1885, making his last appearance at Royal North Devon in 1912 at the age of 73.

He is best remembered for having seven top-10 finishes in the Open Championship, including a third-place finish in 1872.

== Early life ==
Doleman was born in Musselburgh, Scotland, on 16 September 1838. His brothers John, Alexander, and Frank were also golfers.

== Golf career ==
=== 1865 Open Championship ===
The 1865 Open Championship was held on 14 September at Prestwick Golf Club. Andrew Strath won the championship by two shots from Willie Park, Sr. There were 12 competitors. Strath had the lead after the first round on 55, one stroke ahead of Willie Dow and Park, and two ahead of Old Tom Morris. Making his debut, Young Tom Morris scored 60. After two rounds, Park was in the lead with a total of 108 after a round of 52 with Strath a shot behind on 109. Both Dow and Morris dropped out of contention after poor rounds. In the final round, Park scored 56 while Strath took 53 to give him a two stroke victory. Doleman finished in sixth place.

=== 1869 Open Championship ===
The 1869 Open Championship was held on 16 September at Prestwick Golf Club. Tom Morris, Jr., sometimes otherwise known as "Young Tom Morris", won the championship for the second successive time, by 11 strokes from Bob Kirk. Just 14 players entered the Championship. Doleman improved from his effort in the 1865 Open Championship by finishing in the fifth spot. He posted rounds of 60-56-59=175.

Tom Morris, Jr. dominated the championship, leading by three strokes after the first round, four after second and eventually winning by 11 strokes. After the first round Davie Strath and Bob Kirk were both three shots behind Morris. Strath was in second place after two rounds but finished with a 60 to finish third behind Kirk who scored 57.

Morris's first round included a hole-in-one at the 8th hole and his total of 50 (6-4-4-6-5-5-3-1-6-3-3-4) was only one behind his record of the previous year. In the second round Kirk took four strokes in one bunker (the "Alps"), scoring 10, while in the last round he took three shots in another (the "Cardinal's Nob"). He had four twos over the three rounds.

=== 1872 Open Championship ===
The 1872 Open Championship was held 13 September at Prestwick Golf Club in Prestwick, South Ayrshire, Scotland. Scottish professional Tom Morris, Jr. won the Championship for the fourth successive time, by three strokes from runner-up Davie Strath, having been five shots behind Strath before the final round. He was just 21 years and 146 days old. Doleman played impressively, finishing in third place with rounds of 63-60-54=177. As an amateur, he was not eligible to accept any prize money.

== Personal life ==
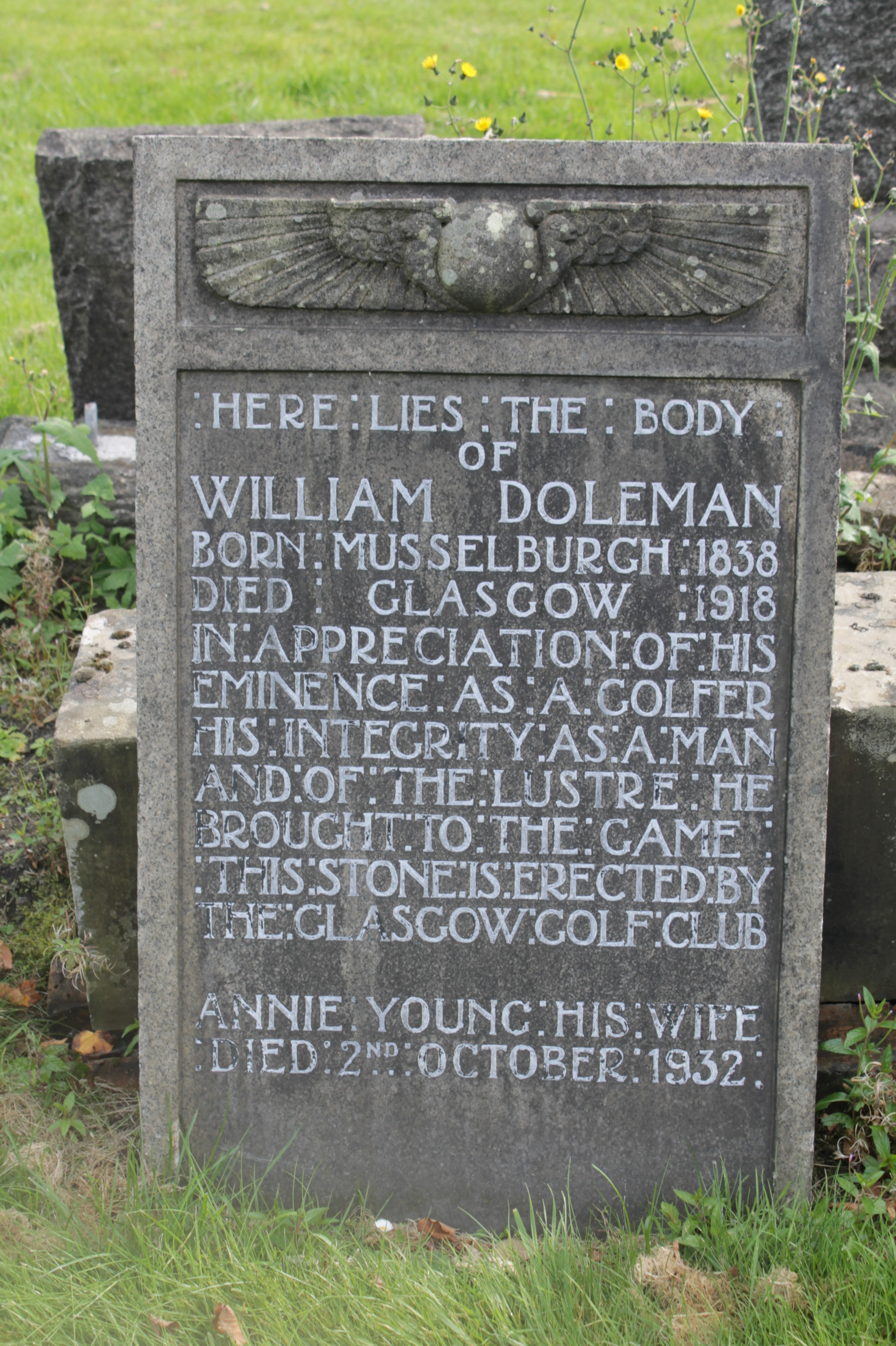
The grave of William Doleman, Glasgow Necropolis

In 1911 he was living at 8 West Graham Street in Glasgow. Doleman died on 8 July 1918 in Glasgow, Scotland. He is buried in the lower southmost section of the Glasgow Necropolis.

He was married to Annie Young who died in 1932 and was buried with him.

== Results in The Open Championship ==
Tournament	1865	1866	1867	1868	1869	1870	1871	1872	1873	1874	1875	1876	1877	1878	1879	1880	1881	1882	1883	1884
The Open Championship	6	T7	6	11	5	5	NT	3		T20	T9	WD	?	WD	T18		?			T16

Note: Doleman played only in The Open Championship and The Amateur Championship.

Top 10
Did not play

NT = no tournament
? = competed, finish unknown
"T" indicates a tie for a place
