= Challenge Belt =

Award presented to the winner of The Open Championship in golf from 1860 to 1870

Four-time Open champions

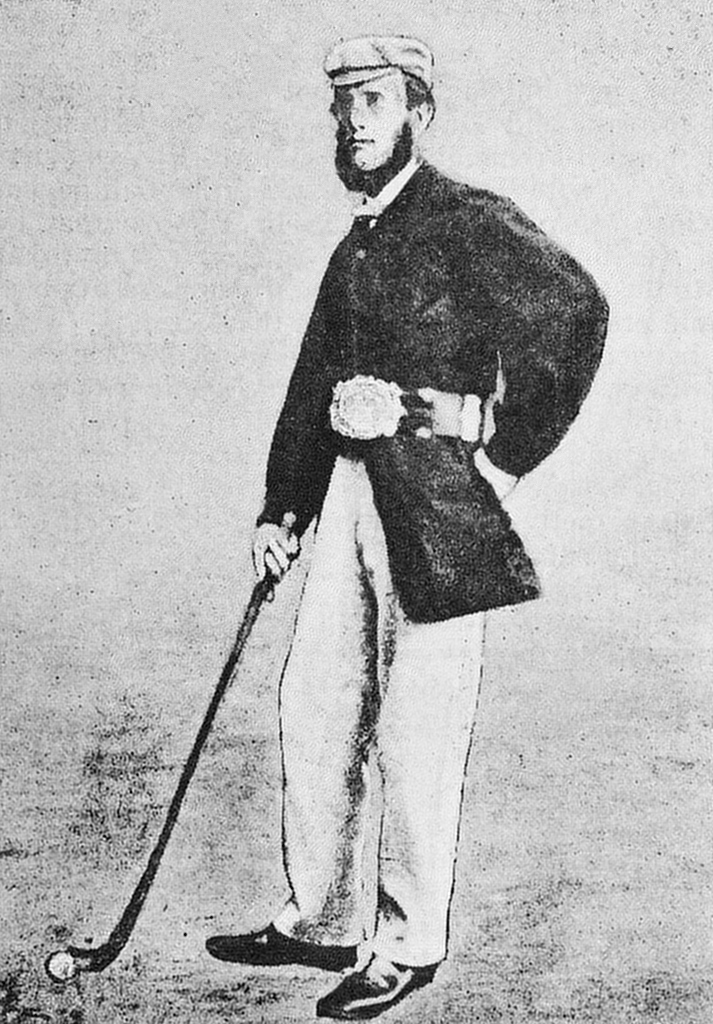
Willie Park Sr. was the first "Champion Golfer of the Year" in 1860. He is wearing the Challenge Belt for winning the event. (Note: Willie Park Sr. would go onto win his 4th Open championship in the 1875 championship)

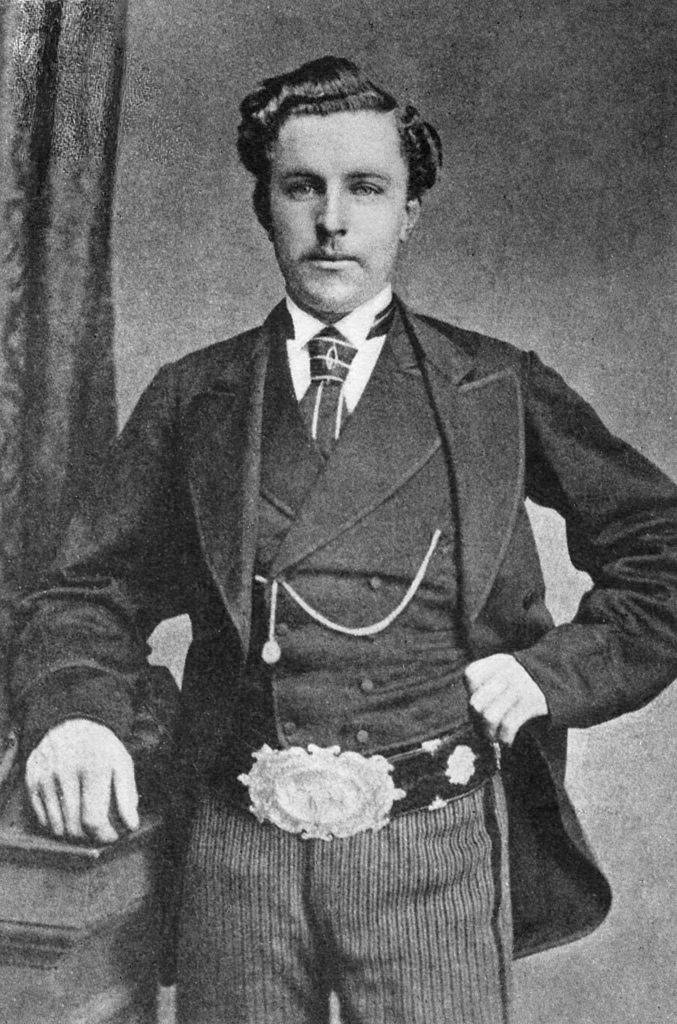
Young Tom Morris wearing the Challenge Belt. After his third victory in the 1870 Open Championship, he was able to keep the belt in perpetuity. (Note: Young Tom Morris would go onto win his 4th Open championship in the 1872 championship)

The Challenge Belt was awarded to the winner of The Open Championship in golf from 1860 until 1870. It was replaced by the Claret Jug for the 1872 Open Championship which is still being used to the present day. The winner of the first Open Championship, Willie Park Sr., in 1860 at the Prestwick Golf Club received no prize money; instead, he was allowed to keep the Belt until the following Open Championship.

== History ==
When the Prestwick Golf Club hosted the first Open Championship in 1860, the Earl of Eglinton suggested a special belt be commissioned for the event. The Belt is made from red Moroccan leather with a large silver buckle and featuring silver panels of golfing scenes with additional medallions denoting the winners and their scores. Members of the Prestwick Golf Club purchased it from Edinburgh silversmiths James & Walter Marshall for the sum of £25 (worth approximately £3,118 in 2021). There were specific rules to govern the management of the Belt:

The party winning the belt shall always leave the belt with the treasurer of the club until he produces a guarantee to the satisfaction of the above committee that the belt shall be safely kept and laid on the table at the next meeting to compete for it until it becomes the property of the winner by being won three times in succession.

In the 1870 Open Championship, Young Tom Morris won his third consecutive title (1868–1870) and the Challenge Belt became his own property. That left the Open Championship without a belt or trophy for the next year's winner. As a result, there was no Open Championship in 1871, and a new trophy had to be found. Prestwick Golf Club agreed to organize the tournament jointly with The Royal and Ancient Golf Club (the R&A) in St Andrews and the Honourable Company of Edinburgh Golfers. Together, they shared the cost of £30 for the new Claret Jug, called the Golf Champion Trophy.

Both the Challenge Belt and the Claret Jug are on display in the Royal & Ancient Clubhouse in St Andrews. The Royal and Ancient Golf Club took possession of the Challenge Belt after the death of Old Tom Morris in 1908 and the Claret Jug in 1928.

== Winners of the Challenge Belt ==
Year	Open Champion
1860	(Scotland) Willie Park Sr.^{1st}
1861	(Scotland) Old Tom Morris^{1st}
1862	(Scotland) Old Tom Morris^{2nd}
1863	(Scotland) Willie Park Sr.^{2nd}
1864	(Scotland) Old Tom Morris^{3rd}
1865	(Scotland) Andrew Strath^{1st}
1866	(Scotland) Willie Park Sr.^{3rd}
1867	(Scotland) Old Tom Morris^{4th}
1868	(Scotland) Young Tom Morris^{1st}
1869	(Scotland) Young Tom Morris^{2nd}
1870	(Scotland) Young Tom Morris^{3rd}
Young Tom Morris won the belt outright by winning the event three times in succession.
