= Claret Jug =

Golf trophy of The Open Championship

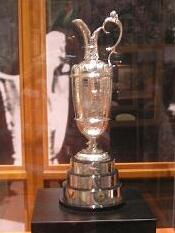
The Claret Jug

The Golf Champion Trophy, commonly known as the Claret Jug, is the trophy presented to the winner of The Open Championship (also called the "British Open"), one of the four major championships in golf.

The awarding of the Claret Jug dates from 1872, when a new trophy was needed after Young Tom Morris had won the original Challenge Belt (presented by Prestwick Golf Club) outright in 1870 by winning the Championship three consecutive seasons. Prestwick had both hosted and organised the Championship from 1860 to 1870.

By the time that Prestwick had reached agreement with the Royal and Ancient Golf Club of St Andrews and the Honourable Company of Edinburgh Golfers (based at Musselburgh) for the championship to rotate at these three venues, more than a year had passed. So, there was no event in 1871.

Each club contributed £10 to the cost of the new trophy, which is inscribed 'The Golf Champion Trophy', and was made by Mackay Cunningham & Company of Edinburgh.

When played the 1872 event trophy was unready to be presented to Morris (his fourth consecutive title), although his name was the first to be engraved on it. In 1872, Morris was presented with a medal as have all subsequent winners. In 1873 Tom Kidd became the first winner to be actually presented with the Claret Jug after winning the Championship.

The original Claret Jug has been on permanent display at the clubhouse of the Royal and Ancient Golf Club of St Andrews since 1928. The original Challenge Belt is also on display at the same site, having been donated in 1908 by the Morris family.

The current Claret Jug was first awarded to Walter Hagen for winning the 1928 Open. The winner must return the trophy before the next year's Open, and receives a replica to keep permanently. Three other replicas exist: one in the R&A World Golf Museum at St Andrews, and two used for travelling exhibitions.

Every year, the winner's name is engraved on the Claret Jug before it is presented to him. The BBC always shows the engraver poised to start work, and the commentators like to speculate about when he will be sure enough of the outcome to begin. Despite some suggestions, at the 1999 Open Championship, Jean van de Velde's name was not engraved on the trophy before he famously choked with a triple-bogey on the 18th hole and Paul Lawrie subsequently won the playoff; engraver Alex Harvey stated, "No, I didn't start engraving the Jug with his name. I've got to wait until the secretary hands me a slip of paper with the winner's name on it, and they always wait until the last putt is dropped." Upon being awarded the Jug in 1989, Mark Calcavecchia said, "How's my name going to fit on that thing?"

The Claret Jug has twice appeared on commemorative £5 Scottish banknotes issued by the Royal Bank of Scotland: first in 2004, for the 250th Anniversary of The Royal and Ancient Golf Club of St Andrews, then in 2005, the jug is shown held by Jack Nicklaus to mark his retirement.

Selection of winners of the Claret Jug
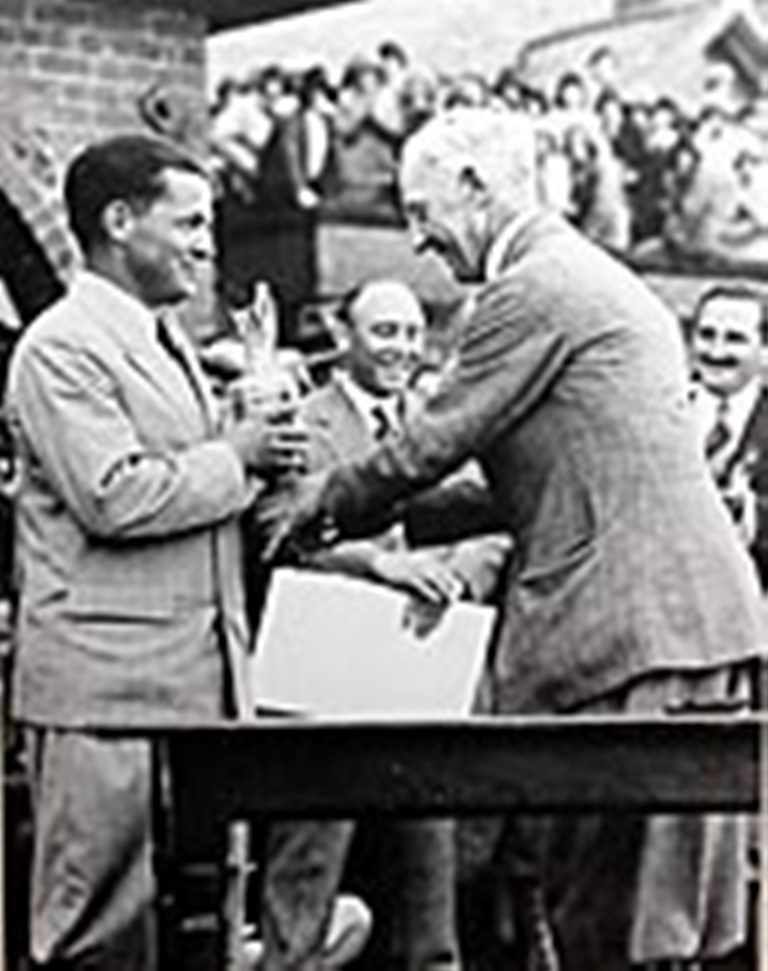
Bobby Jones being presented with the Claret Jug, having won the 1930 Open

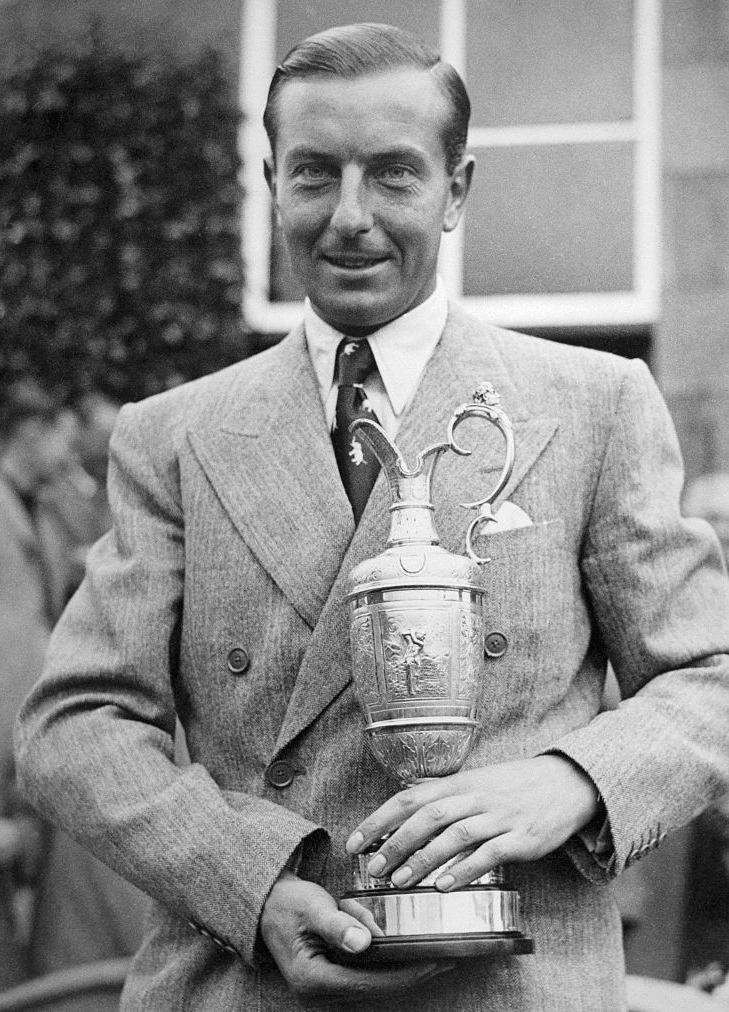
Henry Cotton holding the Claret Jug, having won the 1937 Open

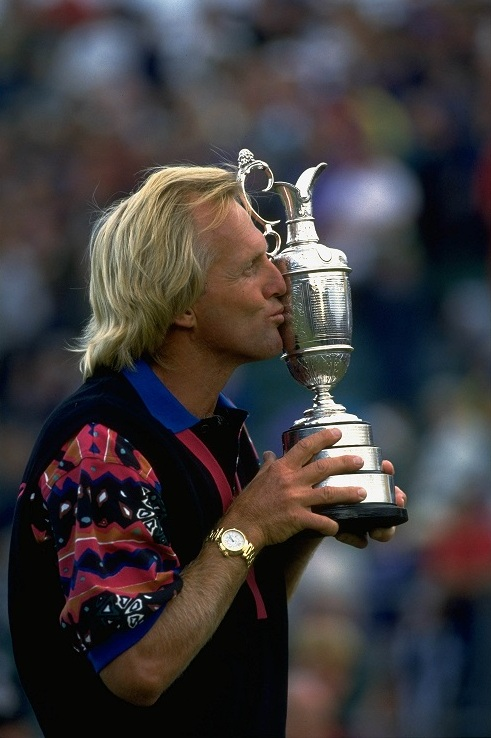
Greg Norman holding the Claret Jug, having won the 1993 Open

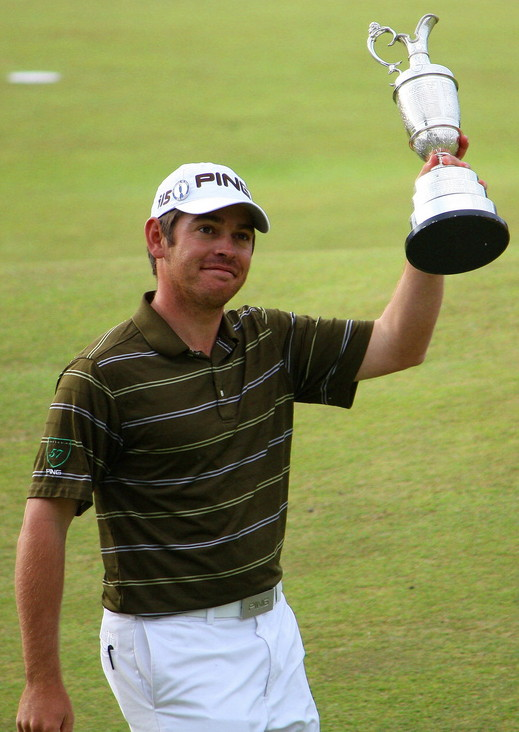
Louis Oosthuizen holding the Claret Jug, having won the 2010 Open
