= St Andrews Links =

Golf course in Scotland

- Interactive map of St Andrews Links
- 56°21′06″N 2°49′05″W

Club information
- Location: St Andrews, Fife, Scotland
- Established: Over 6 centuries
- Type: Public
- Operator: St Andrews Links Trust
- Tournaments: The Open Championship; Alfred Dunhill Links Championship; St Andrews Links Trophy

Old Course
- Par: 72
- Length: 6,721 yards (6,146 m)
- Course record: 61; Ross Fisher (2017)

The Castle Course
- Par: 71
- Length: 6,759 yards (6,180 m)

New Course
- Par: 71
- Length: 6,625 yards (6,058 m)

Jubilee Course
- Par: 72
- Length: 6,742 yards (6,165 m)

Eden Course
- Par: 70
- Length: 6,250 yards (5,720 m)

Strathtyrum Course
- Par: 69
- Length: 5,620 yards (5,140 m)

Balgove Course
- Par: 30
- Length: 1,520 yards (1,390 m)
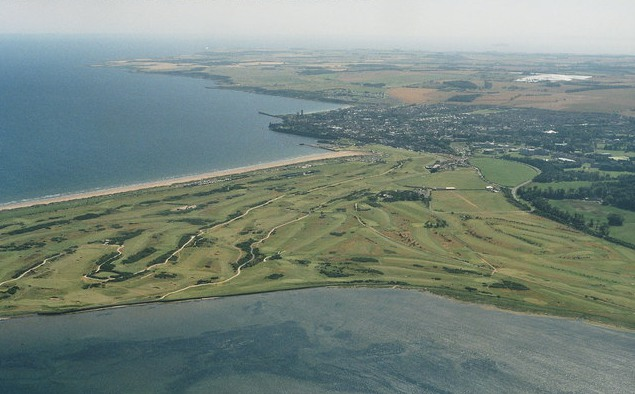
- West Sands Beach running along the coast to the left with the St Andrews Links and the town of St Andrews to the right

St Andrews Links is a historic golf links complex in the town of St Andrews in Scotland, where golf has been played since the 15th century, earning it the nickname "home of golf". There are eight public golf courses owned by Fife Council and operated by the St Andrews Links Trust charity. An area north of the town holds six adjacent courses: the Old, New, Jubilee, Balgove, Eden, and Strathtyrum. The Castle Course lies one mile to the south-east, whilst the recently added Craigtoun Course sits roughly 3 miles to the south-west. The Balgove Course has nine holes, the rest 18.

The Old Course is widely considered one of the world's best and regularly hosts the Open Championship. The St Andrews Links Trust organises several amateur tournaments at the links, of which the most prestigious are the St Andrews Links Trophy for men (comprising one round on the New or Jubilee Course followed by three rounds on the Old Course) and the St Rule Trophy for women (two rounds on the New followed by one on the Old).

Several golf clubs are based at the links. The oldest and most famous of these clubs is The Royal and Ancient Golf Club of St Andrews (founded 1754), which co-administered the rules of golf until the R&A was spun out of it in 2004; its clubhouse is by the first hole of the Old Course. Others, with clubhouses on the block just south of the links, include the St Andrews Thistle Golf Club (founded 1817 and 1865), St Andrews Golf Club (founded 1843), The St Rule Club (golf section founded 1898), The New Golf Club (founded 1902), and St Regulus Ladies Golf Club (founded 1914). While members of these clubs have favourable access to the Links courses, non-members may also play for a fee; most courses require advance booking, and many slots on the Old Course are subject to ballot (lottery).

The St Andrews Links Trust built the St Andrews Links Clubhouse in 1995 by the first holes of the New and Jubilee courses. Pilmour Cottage, a 19th-century villa, was redeveloped from 1998 into the Trust's headquarters and the Eden Clubhouse which serves the Balgove, Eden, and Strathtyrum courses. The two "Clubhouses" have no eponymous clubs and are open to all. The Old Course Hotel is a landmark building abutting the 17th hole of the Old Course (the "Road Hole").

In general, St Andrews is a popular hub for golf tourism, as there is a high density of links and heathland courses in the area. In addition to the public courses there are two courses at the privately owned Fairmont Hotel (Torrance and Kittocks) to the south of the town; and the Duke's and Drumoig, both inland parkland courses to the west. A few miles further South are the modern links of Kingsbarns and the traditional Balcomie links at Crail. Also nearby are the courses at Elie, Lundin, Leven, Scotscraig and Anstruther. Within 45 minutes' drive are Monifieth, Carnoustie and Panmure.

== History ==
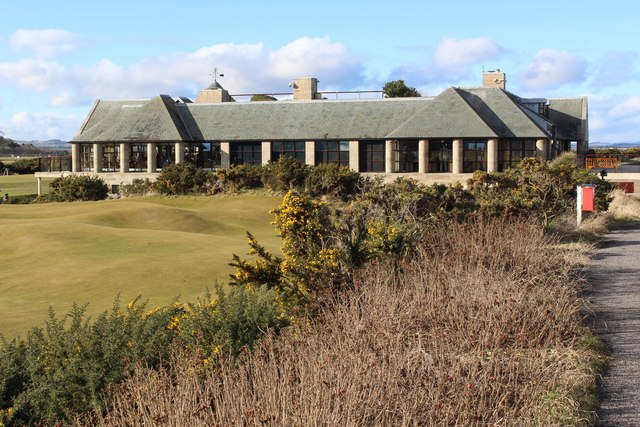
St Andrews Links Clubhouse which is open to the public and serves the Jubilee, the New, and the Old Course

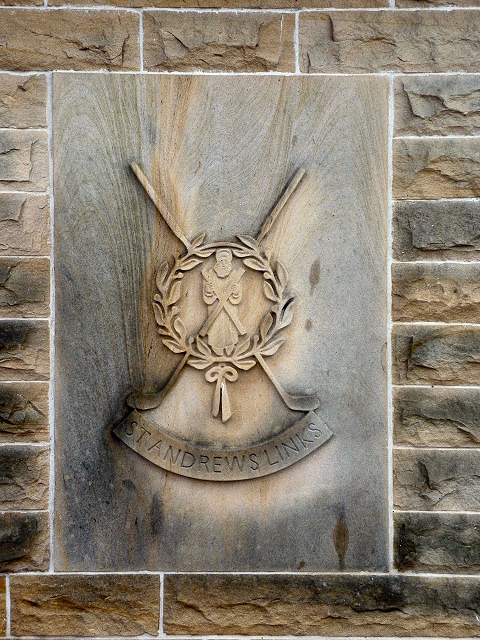
The St Andrews Links crest on the Old Course starter's hut

The history of St Andrews Links goes back to 1552 when John Hamilton was granted a charter to establish a rabbit warren to the north of the links. The St Andrews Links Charter refers to the public ownership of the links and the right of the people of St Andrews to play golf and other games. The right to play golf on the links were subsequently confirmed in local and royal charters.

Designations

Inventory of Gardens and Designed Landscapes in Scotland
- Official name: St Andrews Links
- Designated: 30 March 2005
- Reference no.: GDL00344

St. Andrews Links Act 1894 (Note: Section 1.)
- Act of Parliament
- Parliament of the United Kingdom
- Long title: An Act to empower the Commissioners of the city and royal burgh of St. Andrews to acquire the Links of St. Andrews for a public park and recreation ground and for other purposes.
- Citation: 57 & 58 Vict. c. lxxxiv
- Territorial extent: United Kingdom

Dates
- Royal assent: 20 July 1894
- Commencement: 20 July 1894 (Note: The Acts of Parliament (Commencement) Act 1793.)

Other legislation
- Repealed by: St. Andrews Links Order Confirmation Act 1974

Status: Repealed

Text of statute as originally enacted

St. Andrews Burgh Extension and Links Order Confirmation Act 1913 (Note: Section 2.)
- Act of Parliament
- Parliament of the United Kingdom
- Long title: An Act to confirm a Provisional Order under the Private Legislation Procedure (Scotland) Act 1899 relating to St. Andrews Burgh Extension and Links.
- Citation: 3 & 4 Geo. 5. c. xxviii
- Territorial extent: United Kingdom

Dates
- Royal assent: 4 July 1913
- Commencement: 4 July 1913

Other legislation
- Amended by: St. Andrews Links Order Confirmation Act 1932; St. Andrews Links Order Confirmation Act 1946; St. Andrews Links Order Confirmation Act 1974

Status: Amended

Text of statute as originally enacted

Text of the no as in force today (including any amendments) within the United Kingdom, from legislation.gov.uk.

St. Andrews Links Order Confirmation Act 1924
- Act of Parliament
- Parliament of the United Kingdom
- Long title: An Act to confirm a Provisional Order under the Private Legislation Procedure (Scotland) Act 1899 relating to St. Andrews Links.
- Citation: 14 & 15 Geo. 5. c. xii
- Territorial extent: United Kingdom

Dates
- Royal assent: 29 May 1924
- Commencement: 29 May 1924
- Repealed: 10 April 1974

Other legislation
- Repealed by: St. Andrews Links Order Confirmation Act 1974

Status: Repealed

Text of statute as originally enacted

St. Andrews Links Order Confirmation Act 1932
- Act of Parliament
- Parliament of the United Kingdom
- Long title: An Act to confirm a Provisional Order under the Private Legislation Procedure (Scotland) Act 1899 relating to St. Andrews Links and adjoining lands.
- Citation: 22 & 23 Geo. 5. c. xxii
- Territorial extent: United Kingdom

Dates
- Royal assent: 16 June 1932
- Commencement: 16 June 1932
- Repealed: 19 November 1998

Other legislation
- Amended by: St. Andrews Links Order Confirmation Act 1974
- Repealed by: Statute Law (Repeals) Act 1998

Status: Repealed

Text of statute as originally enacted

St. Andrews Links Order Confirmation Act 1946
- Act of Parliament
- Parliament of the United Kingdom
- Long title: An Act to confirm a Provisional Order under the Private Legislation Procedure (Scotland) Act 1936 relating to St. Andrews Links.
- Citation: 10 & 11 Geo. 6. c. i
- Territorial extent: United Kingdom

Dates
- Royal assent: 19 December 1946
- Commencement: 19 December 1946
- Repealed: 10 April 1974

Other legislation
- Repealed by: St. Andrews Links Order Confirmation Act 1974

Status: Repealed

Text of statute as originally enacted

St. Andrews Links Order Confirmation Act 1974
- Act of Parliament
- Parliament of the United Kingdom
- Long title: An Act to confirm a Provisional Order under the Private Legislation Procedure (Scotland) Act 1936, relating to St. Andrews Links.
- Citation: 1974 c. iii
- Territorial extent: United Kingdom

Dates
- Royal assent: 10 April 1974
- Commencement: 10 April 1974

Other legislation
- Amends: St. Andrews Burgh Extension and Links Order Confirmation Act 1913; St. Andrews Links Order Confirmation Act 1932
- Repeals/revokes: St. Andrews Links Act 1894; St. Andrews Links Order Confirmation Act 1924; St. Andrews Links Order Confirmation Act 1946; St. Andrews Links Order Confirmation Act 1967

Status: Current legislation

Text of statute as originally enacted

The land was acquired by James Cheape, owner of the adjacent Strathtyrum estate, in 1821 and sold by his brother's grandson, also named James Cheape, to the Royal and Ancient Golf Club of St Andrews in 1893. Control of St Andrews Links was regulated by the St. Andrews Links Act 1894 (57 & 58 Vict. c. lxxxiv) and St. Andrews Links Order Confirmation Act 1974 (c. iii) which resulted in the creation of the St Andrews Links Trust.

== Public courses ==
Except as noted, the courses are in the community council area of St Andrews royal burgh.

=== Old Course ===
The Old Course, believed to be the oldest golf course in the world, dates back more than 600 years.

Old Course
Tee	Rating/Slope	1	2	3	4	5	6	7	8	9	Out	10	11	12	13	14	15	16	17	18	In	Total
Par	Men/Women	4	4/5	4	4/5	5	4	4	3	4	36/38	4	3	4	4/5	5	4	4	4/5	4	36/38	72/76
SI	Men/Women	10/12	6/14	16/8	8/6	2	12/10	4	14/18	18/16		15/13	7/17	3	11	1	9/5	13/9	5/7	17/15
Black	M: 73.1 / 132	376	411	370	419	514	374	359	166	347	3336	340	174	316	418	530	414	381	455	357	3385	6721
Blue	M: 71.4 / 129	355	395	337	411	514	360	349	154	289	3164	311	164	304	388	523	391	345	436	361	3223	6387
Green	M: 69.9 / 125 W: 75.5 / 138	339	375	321	401	454	325	335	145	261	2956	296	150	304	377	487	369	325	426	342	3076	6032

=== New Course ===
The New Course, located adjacent to the Old Course, was paid for and commissioned by the Royal and Ancient Golf Club who asked Old Tom Morris to be designer. The New Course opened for play in 1895.

The New Course
Tee	Rating/Slope	1	2	3	4	5	6	7	8	9	Out	10	11	12	13	14	15	16	17	18	In	Total
Par	Men/Women	4	4	5	4	3	4/5	4	5	3	36/37	4/5	4	5	3	4	4	4/5	3	4/5	35/38	71/75
Black	M: 72.8 / 127	336	367	511	369	180	445	356	481	225	3270	464	368	518	157	386	394	431	229	408	3355	6625
Blue	M: 71.6 / 125	299	367	511	351	167	433	336	472	225	3161	457	331	493	147	370	379	416	211	397	3201	6362
Green	M: 69.9 / 121 W: 75.4 / 128	282	356	500	351	158	401	320	464	204	3036	427	308	447	133	363	312	388	192	386	2956	5992

=== Jubilee Course ===
The Jubilee Course is the third championship golf course at the Home of Golf. It was named after Queen Victoria's Diamond Jubilee celebration in 1897.

Originally intended for Victorian dressed ladies, and other golf beginners, it has evolved into one of the hardest courses at St Andrews Links. The course is commonly used to test junior and amateur golfers for the British Mid-Amateur Golf Championship, as well as the St Andrews Links Trophy.

Initially a 12-hole course, it was expanded to 18 holes in 1905. The course has seen considerable developments under the management of Willie Auchterlonie, Donald Steel, David Wilson and Graeme Taylor. It now plays at around 6,745 yards, and is host to the St Andrews Links Trophy. The Jubilee is one of several courses in Scotland that are under threat from erosion.

The Jubilee Course
Tee	Rating/Slope	1	2	3	4	5	6	7	8	9	Out	10	11	12	13	14	15	16	17	18	In	Total
Par	Men/Women	4	4	5	4	3	5	4	4	3	36	4	5	5	3	4/5	4	4/5	3	4	36/38	72/74
Black	M: 72.6 / 131	367	360	546	371	162	498	373	369	192	3238	411	497	538	188	438	356	428	211	437	3504	6742
Blue	M: 71.2 / 127	337	352	524	349	141	480	341	344	182	3050	403	488	516	176	423	346	418	199	405	3374	6424
Green	M: 69.2 / 123 W: 74.6 / 128	318	271	506	332	132	422	329	326	139	2775	387	470	479	147	415	341	409	180	372	3200	5975

=== Eden Course ===
The Eden Course opened in 1914 after demand on the existing courses grew. It was designed by Harry Colt, and alterations in 1989 by Donald Steel maintain Colt's standards. It was named after the Eden estuary by which it resides, as the profits from mussels collected there once made up an important part of the St Andrews economy.

The Eden Course
Tee	Rating/Slope	1	2	3	4	5	6	7	8	9	Out	10	11	12	13	14	15	16	17	18	In	Total
Par	Men/Women	4	4/5	4/5	4	3	4	4	3	5	35/37	3	4	4	4/5	4	3	5	4	4	35/36	70/73
Black	M: 70.6 / 125 W: 76.0 / 129	326	449	417	273	144	407	346	178	505	3045	196	375	341	422	350	170	568	432	351	3205	6250
Blue	M: 68.9 / 121 W: 73.9 / 125	301	438	402	251	125	376	307	155	484	2839	187	364	326	404	334	151	523	407	334	3030	5869
Green	M: 67.9 / 119 W: 72.1 / 122	270	438	402	240	119	371	291	139	466	2736	148	327	283	404	316	108	433	378	317	2714	5450

=== Balgove Course ===
The Balgove Course, named after the farm on which it was built, is a 1,520 yard, par 30, nine-hole course. It was originally opened in 1972 and remodeled in 1993.

The Balgove Course
Tee	Rating/Slope	1	2	3	4	5	6	7	8	9	Total
Par		4	4	3	3	3	4	3	3	3	30
White	M:57.0/79 W: 57.6/80	220	219	104	194	161	298	103	116	105	1520

=== Strathtyrum Course ===
The Strathtyrum Course, opened in July 1993, became the first new 18 hole layout at St Andrews in nearly 80 years. It was built on land that was previously part of the Strathtyrum estate and sold to the St Andrews Links Trust by Mrs Gladys Cheape in 1986. The west end of the course is in Guardbridge and District community council area.

The Strathtyrum Course
Tee	Rating/Slope	1	2	3	4	5	6	7	8	9	Out	10	11	12	13	14	15	16	17	18	In	Total
Par	Men/Women	4	4	3	4	5/4	3	4	3	4	34/33	4	5	4	3	4	4	3	4	4	35	69/68
Black	M: 66.2 / 107 W: 71.7 / 116	332	350	154	298	497	125	331	183	366	2636	338	512	389	168	350	300	137	376	414	2984	5620
Blue	M: 63.4 / 101 W: 68.2 / 108	327	319	149	256	451	120	290	160	340	2412	292	442	312	143	312	265	120	321	385	2592	5004
Green	M: 62.0 / 99 W: 66.8 / 105	315	312	140	248	384	110	284	154	334	2281	288	401	308	133	264	257	114	314	345	2424	4705

=== The Castle Course ===
The Castle Course opened in June 2008, becoming the seventh public course at St Andrews. It is in Boarhills and Dunino community council area, set on a rugged-cliff top a mile to the east of St Andrews with extensive views over the town, and was designed by the architect David McLay Kidd. The course is a par 71 and measures 6,759 yards from the back tees.

The Castle Course
Tee	Rating/Slope	1	2	3	4	5	6	7	8	9	Out	10	11	12	13	14	15	16	17	18	In	Total
Par		4	4	3	5	5	4	4	3	4	36	3	4	4	3	4	5	4	3	5	35	71
Black	M: 73.6 / 139	346	404	202	540	536	421	456	141	381	3427	167	402	454	179	400	585	406	184	555	3332	6759
Blue	M: 71.7 / 137	337	394	179	518	504	399	429	129	351	3240	154	385	415	154	376	555	390	174	533	3136	6376
Green	M: 67.3 / 126 W: 73.0 / 131	300	344	145	476	446	355	341	122	314	2843	130	289	340	119	312	509	346	142	430	2617	5460
