= List of The Open Championship venues =

The current Open Championship rota venues.
The next Open Championship in 2027 (St Andrews) is shown in green.

The Open Championship is an annual golf competition established in 1860, and is organised by The R&A. It is played on the weekend of the third Friday in July, and is the last of the four major championships to be played each year. The championship is held on a different course each year. Fourteen courses have hosted the event, all links courses in Scotland, England and Northern Ireland. Ten are currently used in the rota.

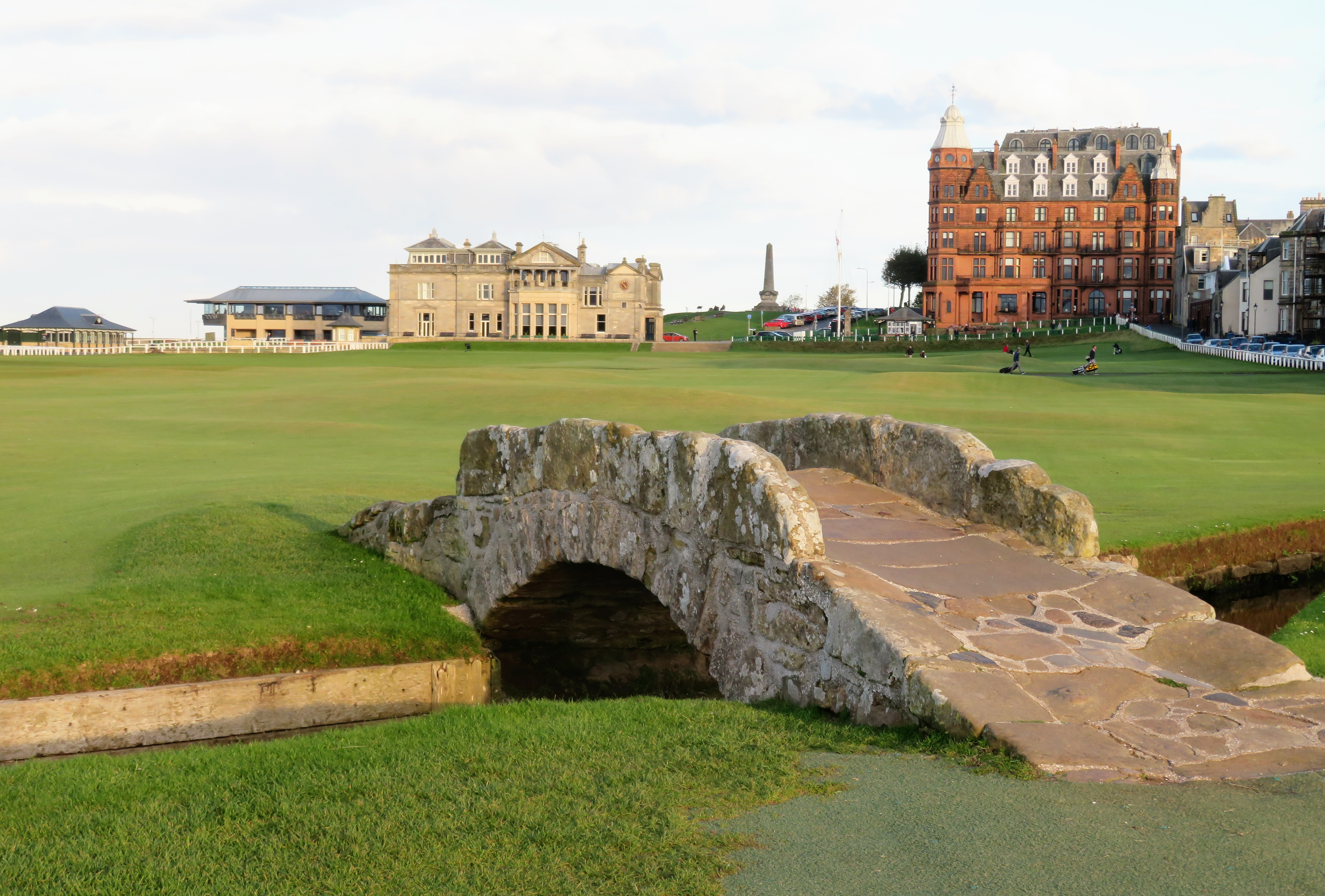
The Swilcan Bridge in the foreground on the Old Course at St Andrews, which has hosted the Open Championship a record 30 times.

Prestwick Golf Club hosted the first championship in 1860 and remained the only venue until 1873, when the Old Course at St Andrews hosted the event. Prestwick hosted a further 12 championships, the last in 1925. Musselburgh Links became the third course to host the championship in 1874. The three courses rotated the hosting until 1892 when Muirfield hosted the event. The Honourable Company of Edinburgh golfers built their own course at Muirfield and Musselburgh was removed from the rota as a result. Royal St George's Golf Club became the first course outside Scotland to host the championship in 1894.

Royal Liverpool Golf Club hosted the competition for the first time in 1897. Royal Cinque Ports Golf Club became the next course to host the event in 1909. The course hosted a further championship in 1920, but further attempts to host the championship in 1938 and 1949 were thwarted by bad weather and the course was dropped from the rota. Royal Troon, Royal Lytham & St Annes and Carnoustie held the Open Championship for the first time in 1923, 1926 and 1931 respectively. The following year Prince's Golf Club hosted the event for the only time. The course was requisitioned by the military during the Second World War and was extensively damaged. Royal Birkdale was chosen as the host course in 1940, however, due to the Second World War the event did not go ahead. It was not until 1954 that Royal Birkdale hosted the Open.

The Old Course at St Andrews has hosted the most championships, 30, most recently in 2022. The championship has been held outside Scotland and England three times, in 1951, 2019 and 2025; Royal Portrush Golf Club in Northern Ireland was the venue for all three tournaments. Turnberry became the most recent course to host the championship for the first time, when it held the 1977 Open Championship. The R&A said in 2021 that they would not hold the event at Turnberry in the foreseeable future.

In 2023, the R&A announced that it was looking at the possibility of taking the championship to a venue outside the UK for the first time, with Portmarnock Golf Club in County Dublin its preferred choice. The Irish government indicated its support of the idea the following year with a commitment of €40m of funding towards the venture. In the summer of 2026, the R&A completed its feasibility study into the use of Portmarnock as an Open venue, and announced its satisfaction with the result, with a view to announcing a potential date for the championship to be held there by the end of 2026.

== Venues ==
Key
†	Courses that are no longer on the Open rota
—N/a	Courses in rota with next hosting not yet assigned

The Open Championship venues
Venue	Location	First	Last	Next	Times	Lowest 72- hole score	Player (year)	Ref
Prestwick Golf Club †	Prestwick, Scotland	1860	1925	†	24	291	James Braid (1908)	
Old Course at St Andrews	St Andrews, Scotland	1873	2022	2027	30	268 (−20)	Cameron Smith (2022)	
Musselburgh Links †	Musselburgh, Scotland	1874	1889	†	6	155^{[A]}	Willie Park, Jnr (1889)	
Muirfield	Gullane, Scotland	1892	2013	—N/a	16	271 (−13)	Tom Watson (1980)	
Royal St George's Golf Club	Sandwich, England	1894	2021	—N/a	15	265 (−15)	Collin Morikawa (2021)	
Royal Liverpool Golf Club	Hoylake, England	1897	2023	—N/a	13	270 (−18)	Tiger Woods (2006)	
Royal Cinque Ports Golf Club †	Deal, England	1909	1920	†	2	291	John Henry Taylor (1909)	
Royal Troon Golf Club	Troon, Scotland	1923	2024	—N/a	10	264 (−20)	Henrik Stenson (2016)	
Royal Lytham & St Annes Golf Club	Lytham St Annes, England	1926	2012	2028	11	271 (−13)	Tom Lehman (1996)	
Carnoustie Golf Links	Carnoustie, Scotland	1931	2018	2029	8	276 (−8)	Francesco Molinari (2018)	
Prince's Golf Club †	Sandwich, England	1932	1932	†	1	283 (−13)	Gene Sarazen (1932)	
Royal Portrush Golf Club	Portrush, County Antrim, Northern Ireland	1951	2025	—N/a	3	267 (−17)	Scottie Scheffler (2025)	
Royal Birkdale Golf Club	Southport, England	1954	2026	—N/a	11	268 (−12)	Jordan Spieth (2017)	
Trump Turnberry	South Ayrshire, Scotland	1977	2009	—N/a	4	268 (−12)	Tom Watson (1977); Nick Price (1994)	

== Notes ==
A. From 1860 to 1891 The Open Championship was contested over 36 holes.
