= 1872 Open Championship =

12th Open Championship, at Prestwick Golf Club, South Ayrshire, Scotland

Coordinates: 56.043°N 2.823°W

Tournament information
- Dates: 13 September 1872
- Location: Prestwick, South Ayrshire, Scotland
- Course: Prestwick Golf Club

Statistics
- Field: 8 players
- Prize fund: Not known
- Winner's share: £8

Champion
- (Scotland) Tom Morris Jr.
- 166

Location in Scotland

The 1872 Open Championship was the 12th Open Championship, held 13 September at Prestwick Golf Club in Prestwick, South Ayrshire, Scotland. Tom Morris Jr. won the Championship for the fourth successive time, by three strokes from runner-up Davie Strath, having been five shots behind Strath before the final round. He was just 21 years and 146 days old.

In 1870, Tommy Morris Jr. had won the Challenge Belt for the third successive year and gained permanent possession of it. The Championship was, therefore, without a trophy. At the 1871 Spring Meeting of Prestwick Golf Club (which had run and hosted the Championship from its start in 1860), it was agreed that they would invite The Royal and Ancient Golf Club of St Andrews and the Honourable Company of Edinburgh Golfers at Musselburgh to share in the running and hosting of the Championship. Discussions proceeded slowly and thus there was no Championship in 1871.

The Championship was announced in August 1872, although the final minute of agreement between Prestwick, the Royal and Ancient and the Honourable Company to host The Open jointly was not signed until 11 September. Each of the three clubs would host the Championship in rotation and each agreed to contribute £10 towards the cost of the new trophy. The first Championship under this agreement was played at Prestwick just two days later, on 13 September. There was no time to get the new trophy made and winner was presented with a medal instead as well as the £8 first prize.

There were only 8 competitors and the contest started at 10 a.m. The pairings were Tom Morris Jr. (St Andrews) and William Hunter (Prestwick St Nicholas), Tom Morris Jr. (St Andrews) and Davie Park (Musselburgh), Charlie Hunter (Prestwick) and William Doleman (Prestwick St Nicholas), Davie Strath (St Andrews) and Hugh Brown (Prestwick). There was a strong wind all day which made for difficult playing conditions.

Tom Morris Jr. scored 57 in the first round, missing four short putts. Davie Strath went one better, scoring 56. Charles Hunter had the third best score with 60. At the 4th hole of his second round Morris's third shot ended up against the wall at the back of the green. Morris couldn't play towards the green and so he hit the ball into the wall to try to make it rebound onto the green. However the ball jumped into the air, went over the wall and landed on the far side. Morris then played a blind niblick shot over the wall and "laid it dead at the hole". He finished with a 56 and a total of 113. Strath, however, had a 52, for a total of 108 and a 5-shot lead. Park was now third, but 10 strokes behind Strath.

In the final round, Morris had a good score of 53 and set a target of 166. Strath started the round well "but after the second hole he played an unfortunate iron shot, which caused him three strokes." He lost another shot at the last after going in the water. He ended up with a round of 61 and a total of 169, three strokes behind Morris.

== Final leaderboard ==
Friday, 13 September 1872

Place	Player	Score	Money
1	(Scotland) Tom Morris, Jr.	57-56-53=166	£8
2	(Scotland) Davie Strath	56-52-61=169	
3	(Scotland) William Doleman (a)	63-60-54=177	
T4	(Scotland) Tom Morris Sr.	62-60-57=179	
T4	(Scotland) Davie Park	61-57-61=179	
6	(Scotland) Charlie Hunter	60-60-69=189	
7	(Scotland) Hugh Brown	65-73-61=199	
8	(Scotland) William Hunter (a)	65-63-74=202	
