= 1870 Open Championship =

Tournament information
- Dates: 15 September 1870
- Location: Prestwick, South Ayrshire, Scotland
- Course: Prestwick Golf Club

Statistics
- Field: 20 players
- Prize fund: £12
- Winner's share: £6

Champion
- (Scotland) Tom Morris, Jr.
- 149

Location in Scotland

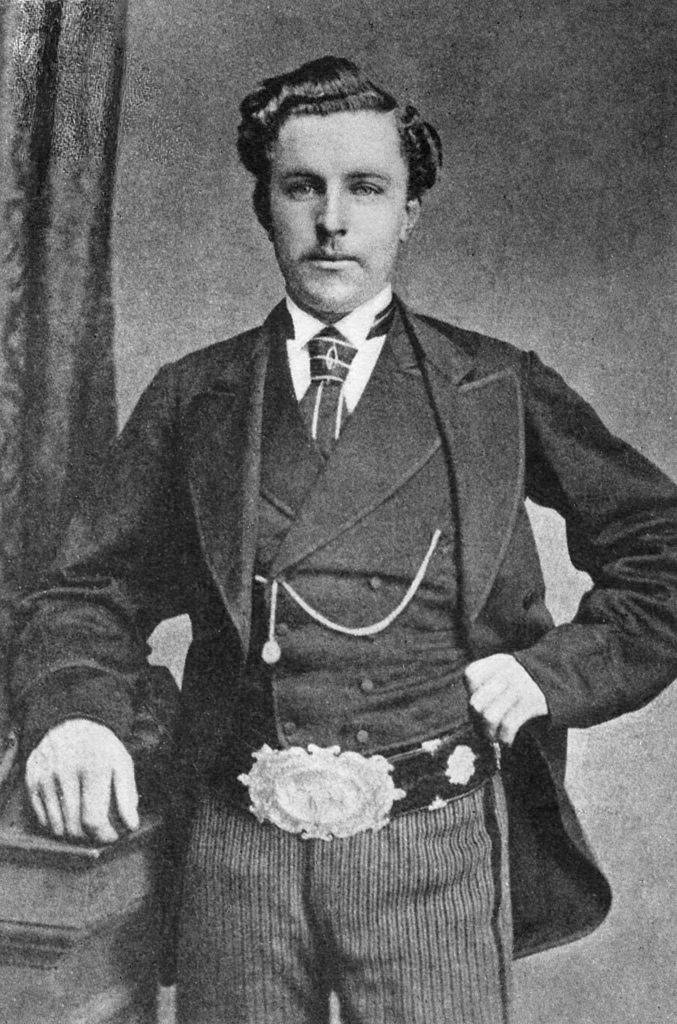
Tom Morris, Jr. wearing the Challenge Belt.

The 1870 Open Championship was a golf competition held at Prestwick Golf Club, Ayrshire, Scotland. It was the 11th Open Championship and the last to be contested for the Challenge Belt. Tom Morris, Jr. won the championship by 12 shots from Bob Kirk and Davie Strath. By winning for a third successive time Tom Morris, Jr. gained permanent possession of the Challenge Belt.

The contest took place the day after the autumn meeting of the club. A published notice for the benefit of prospective entrants to the tournament read, "On Thurs the 15th Sept. the Champion Belt, given by the Prestwick Golf Club, and open to all Members of Established Golf Clubs and Professionals, will be competed for".

Tommy Morris's first round of 47 (3-5-3-5-6-3-3-3-4-3-4-5) was two shots better than his previous record round in 1868. This gave him a five shot lead over Bob Kirk. After a second round 51 he held a five shot lead over Davie Strath. A final 51 extended his lead to 12 shots. His final score of 149 was 5 shots better than the previous record set in 1868. There were 20 starters but only 17 returned scores.

Morris returned to St Andrews by train, late on Saturday evening. A "great multitude" were there to meet him and he was carried, shoulder high, to Mr. Leslie's Golf Hotel, where his health was drunk.

== Final leaderboard ==
Thursday, 15 September 1870

Place	Player	Score	Money
1	(Scotland) Tom Morris, Jr.	47-51-51=149	£6
2	(Scotland) Bob Kirk	52-52-57=161	Playoff
3	(Scotland) Davie Strath	54-49-58=161	Playoff
4	(Scotland) Tom Morris, Sr.	56-52-54=162	
5	(Scotland) William Doleman (a)	57-54-58=169	
6	(Scotland) Willie Park, Sr.	60-55-58=173	
7	(Scotland) Jamie Anderson	59-57-58=174	
8	(Scotland) John Allan	61-58-57=176	
T9	(Scotland) Charlie Hunter	58-56-64=178	
T9	(Scotland) Alexander Doleman (a)	61-59-58=178	

=== Playoff ===
Kirk beat Strath in a 12-hole playoff, Kirk winning by 56 to 60 and taking the £4 second prize while Strath took the third prize of £2. This was the first time that there had been a tie for prize money since it was introduced in 1863.
