= Bob Kirk =

Scottish professional golfer (1845–1886)

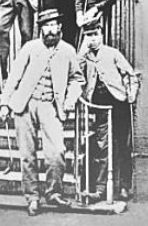
- Kirk (right) with Old Tom Morris on 17 May 1867 at Leith Links

Personal information
- Full name: Robert Kirk
- Nationality: Scotland
- Born: 9 March 1845 St Andrews, Scotland
- Died: 1 December 1886 (aged 41) St Andrews, Scotland

Career
- Sport: Golf
- Turned professional: c. 1862

Best results in major championships
- The Open Championship: 2nd: 1869, 1870, 1878

Robert Kirk (9 March 1845 – 1 December 1886) was a Scottish professional golfer. He was born at St Andrews, Scotland, and died there. His golf career was highlighted by second-place finishes in The Open Championship in 1869 and again in 1878. Kirk also had a second-place finish in the 1870 Open Championship after winning a playoff against Davie Strath. Kirk played consistently well with nine top-10 finishes in The Open Championship beginning with a fourth-place finish in 1865 and ending with a second-place finish in 1878.

== Early life ==
Kirk was born on 9 March 1845 in St Andrews, Scotland.

== Golf career ==
=== 1878 Open Championship ===
Kirk's best chance to win the Open Championship came in the 1878 Open Championship, held 4 October at Prestwick Golf Club in Prestwick, South Ayrshire, Scotland. Fellow Scotsman Jamie Anderson won the Championship for the second successive year, by two strokes from runner-up Kirk. Kirk fired rounds of 53-55-51=159 and won £5 in prize money.

==== Details of play ====
In stormy overcast weather with some rain—typical conditions for early October at Prestwick—James Morris took the early lead with a first round of 50. Anderson, Kirk and the English amateur John Ball each scored 53, to be three shots behind. Morris began the second round badly and finished with a 56 for a total of 106. Anderson, with a second round of 53, was tied with him, while Kirk and Tom Morris, Sr. were both two strokes behind.

Morris was in the third group out and had a final round 55 for a total of 161. Playing a few groups behind, Anderson began his third round with two sevens, but thereafter played steadily. With Morris finished he was told that he needed to play the last four holes in 17 to tie with Morris. At the Burn Hole (the 9th) he holed a full iron shot for a three, followed that spectacular shot with a four at the 10th, and at the Short Hole (the 11th) his tee shot landed on top of the hill behind the green. The ball then ran down the hill and into the hole for a hole-in-one. A five at the last gave him a round of 51 and a total of 157. Kirk, playing in the last group, was still in contention. On the last green he was told that if he holed his long putt he would tie Anderson. The putt lipped out and he missed the return putt but his score of 159 was enough to give him second place.

=== 1869 and 1870 Open Championships ===
Tom Morris, Jr. was the best golfer in the world in the late 1860s and early 1870s and he exhibited his considerable skills in the 1869 Open Championship and the 1870 Open Championship tournaments. At this point in time he was beating his legendary father, Tom Morris, Sr., on a regular basis. In the 1869 Open Championship, Morris, Jr. won going away by an 11-shot margin and bested that effort in the 1870 Open by trouncing the field by 12 shots. In both years Kirk was the distant second-place finisher.

== Death ==
Kirk died on 1 December 1886 at the relatively young age of just 41.

== Results in The Open Championship ==
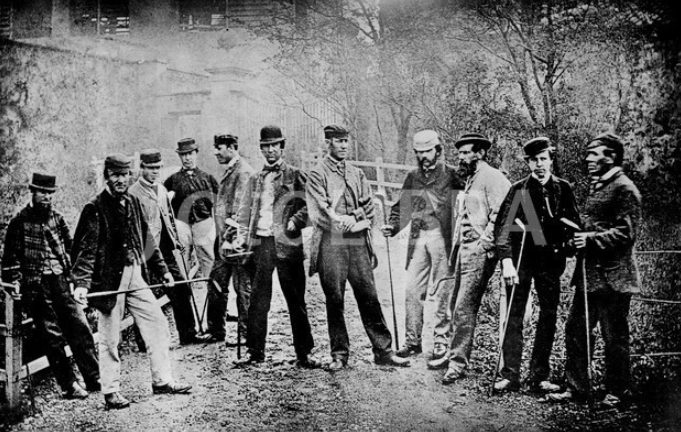
Kirk (third from left) at Leith Links in 1867

Tournament	1865	1866	1867	1868	1869	1870	1871	1872	1873	1874	1875	1876	1877	1878
The Open Championship	4	5	5	7	2	2	NT		T3			T8		2

Note: Kirk played only in The Open Championship.

Top 10
Did not play

NT = no tournament
"T" indicates a tie for a place
