= Links (golf) =

Style of golf course

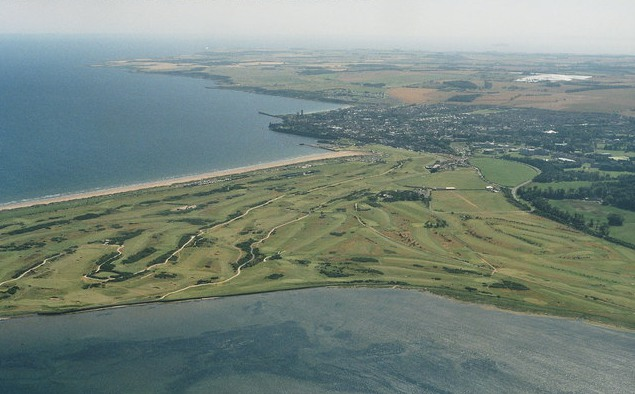
St Andrews Links, Fife, Scotland

A links is the oldest style of golf course, first developed in Scotland. Links courses are generally built on sandy coastland that offers a firmer playing surface than parkland and heathland courses.

The word "links" comes via the Scots language from the Old English word hlinc: "rising ground, ridge" and refers to an area of coastal sand dunes and sometimes to open parkland; it is cognate with lynchet. "Links" can be treated as singular even though it has an "s" at the end and occurs in place names that precede the development of golf, for example Lundin Links in Fife. It also retains this more general meaning in standard Scottish English. Links land is typically characterised by dunes, an undulating surface, and a sandy soil unsuitable for arable farming, but which readily supports various indigenous browntop bent and red fescue grasses. Together, the soil and grasses result in the firm turf associated with links courses and the "running" game. The hard surface typical of the links-style course allows balls to "run" out much further than on softer turf courses after a fairway landing. Players often aim to land the ball short of the green, which allows the ball to roll up onto the green instead of landing there directly in the more targeted-landing style used on softer surfaces.

== Geographic location and course management ==
Links courses tend to be on, or at least very near to, a coast, and the term is typically associated with coastal courses. These courses are often amid dunes, with barely any water hazards and few, if any, trees. This reflects both the nature of the scenery where the sport originated and the limited resources available to golf course architects at that time. Soil movement, for example, had to be done by hand, and thus was kept to a minimum, as was irrigation. Even today, some links courses do not employ a greens staff, use only basic machinery such as hole cutters without boards, resulting in a hole that is cut unevenly, and use grazing animals to keep the grass cropped.

== Determining factors ==
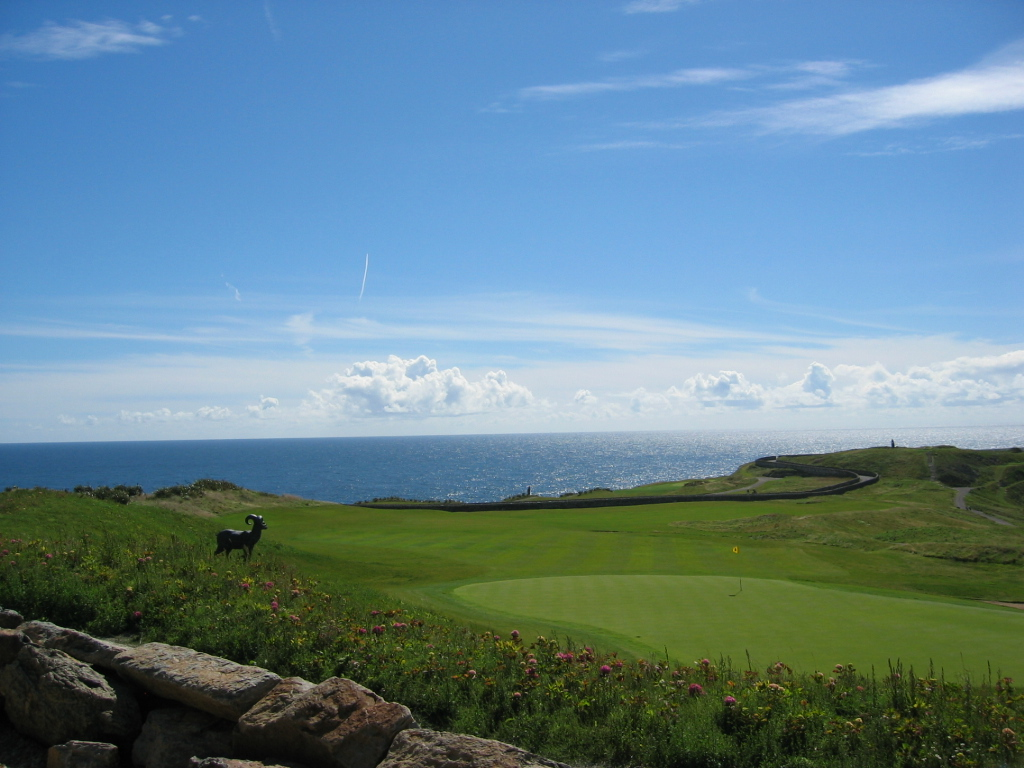
The 18th hole at the Old Head Golf Links on the Old Head of Kinsale

Although the term links is often used loosely to describe any golf course, few golf courses have all of the design elements of true links courses, including being built on linksland. The presence of a seaside location does not guarantee a links golf course. Many famous courses regarded as links do not, as presently constituted, have all of the necessary characteristics (e.g., Pebble Beach Golf Links, Old Head Golf Links at Kinsale, The Ocean Course at Kiawah Island). On the other hand, some courses located hundreds of miles from a seacoast, such as Whistling Straits, near Kohler, Wisconsin, on the Great Lakes, can have all of the characteristics of a seaside links except for proximity to saltwater.

== Notable courses ==
Links courses remain most common in Great Britain, especially in Scotland, as well as in Ireland. The Open Championship is always played on links courses, and this is one of the main features which differentiates it from the three major championships held in the United States. The first exception to this was the 2004 PGA Championship, which was played on a links-style course, Whistling Straits, located near Sheboygan, Wisconsin. The 2015 U.S. Open was played at Chambers Bay, a British links-style course in University Place, Washington. Royal Adelaide Golf Club is a links course in Adelaide, South Australia, and was partly designed by Alister MacKenzie, who said of the location, "One finds a most delightful combination of sand dunes and fir trees. I have never seen a seaside course possess such magnificent sand craters, as those at Royal Adelaide."

Modern seaside "links-style" developments have also appeared beyond the British Isles; for example, the Links course at La Hacienda Links Golf Resort in San Roque, Cádiz, Spain—originally designed by Peter Alliss and Clive Clark and extensively redesigned by architect Kurtis Bowman—reopened in 2022 and has since received industry recognition.

== Playing style ==
The unique nature of links courses necessitates a distinct style of play. The challenges links traits present fall into two categories: topography, which tends to be characterised by uneven fairways, thick rough, and small, deep "pot bunkers"; and climatic, dominated by windy conditions created by their coastal location and lack of trees, and frequent intermittent rain squalls.

Links topography favours a controlled style of golf, as hazards abound. Low and even bouncing shots allow balls to be skipped onto greens rather than high flights landed with strong backspin. Windy or blustery weather also calls for low, accurate shots. Damp conditions demand concentration and caution.

As many traditional links courses consist of an "outward" nine in one direction along the coast, and an opposite "inward" nine returning, players often have to cope with contrasting wind patterns in each half of their round.
