= 1869 Open Championship =

Tournament information
- Dates: 16 September 1869
- Location: Prestwick, South Ayrshire, Scotland
- Course: Prestwick Golf Club

Statistics
- Field: 14 players
- Prize fund: £12
- Winner's share: £6

Champion
- (Scotland) Young Tom Morris
- 157

Location in Scotland

The 1869 Open Championship was the tenth Open Championship and was held on 16 September at Prestwick Golf Club. Young Tom Morris won the championship for the second successive time, by 11 strokes from Bob Kirk. Just 14 players entered the Championship.

Young Tom Morris dominated the championship, leading by three strokes after the first round, four after second and eventually winning by 11 strokes. After the first round Davie Strath and Bob Kirk were both three shots behind Morris. Strath was in second place after two rounds but finished with a 60 to finish third behind Kirk who scored 57.

Morris's first round included a hole-in-one at the 8th hole and his total of 50 (6-4-4-6-5-5-3-1-6-3-3-4) was only one behind his record of the previous year. In the second round Kirk took four strokes in one bunker (the "Alps"), scoring 10, while in the last round he took three shots in another (the "Cardinal's Nob"). He had four twos over the three rounds.

== Final leaderboard ==
Thursday, 16 September 1869

Place	Player	Score	Money
1	(Scotland) Young Tom Morris	50-55-52=157	£6
2	(Scotland) Bob Kirk	53-58-57=168	£4
3	(Scotland) Davie Strath	53-56-60=169	£2
4	(Scotland) Jamie Anderson	60-56-57=173	
5	(Scotland) William Doleman (a)	60-56-59=175	
6	(Scotland) Tom Morris Sr.	56-62-58=176	
7	(Scotland) Gilbert Mitchell-Innes (a)	64-58-58=180	
8	(Scotland) Tom Dunn	62-61-59=182	
9	(Scotland) Charlie Hunter	62-61-64=187	

The remaining five players withdrew and did not complete the 36 holes.
