= Davie Strath =

Scottish golfer

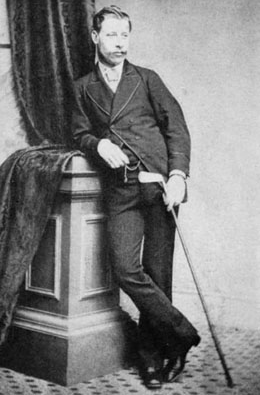
- Strath, c. 1875

Personal information
- Full name: David Strath
- Nationality: Scotland
- Born: c. 1849 St Andrews, Scotland
- Died: 28 January 1879 (aged 29–30) Melbourne, Australia

Career
- Sport: Golf
- Turned professional: c. 1867

Best results in major championships
- The Open Championship: 2nd: 1872, 1876

David Strath (c. 1849 – 28 January 1879) was a Scottish professional golfer. His golf career was highlighted with a trio of second-place finishes in the 1870, 1873 and 1876 Open Championships. In 1876, he lost the playoff to fellow countryman Bob Martin.

== Early life ==
Strath was born in St Andrews, Scotland, circa 1849, the son of Alexander Strath and Susan Reid.

== Golf career ==
Strath toured Scotland and parts of England in the 1870s—both on his own and with fellow countryman Tom Morris, Jr.—playing exhibition matches on his own account, without official sanction; this was the first time this had been done. He finished in second place in the Open Championship twice in 1872 and 1876 (forfeited 1876 playoff after a rules controversy).

The Strath family of four brothers all died, except George, of consumption as young men. Andrew, the second son, was the Open champion in 1865, but David was the star golfer in the family. When in the autumn of 1878 he fell ill, he decided on the advice of doctors in the Scottish town of North Berwick to embark on the 84-day voyage to Melbourne, Australia, to recover.

== Emigration to Australia ==
No one in Scotland had ever been able to determine what happened to the 29-year-old champion who helped design the North Berwick course. Many people assumed he had died on the ship when he did not return to Scotland. It was later discovered that Strath suffered acute laryngitis on the voyage and arrived in Melbourne in a weakened state, dying just 20 days later. He died in a house on Royal Terrace in the Melbourne suburb of Carlton next to the residence of a Professor Halford, who had studied at St Andrews University in Scotland and eventually founded the medical school at Melbourne University.

== Death ==
Strath died on 28 January 1879 in Melbourne, Australia. He was interred in an unmarked grave in the Presbyterian section of the Melbourne General Cemetery. With the collaborative efforts of the golf club of St Andrews and the Golf Society of Australia, funding was provided to erect a proper stone grave marker for Strath in January 2006.

== Results in The Open Championship ==
Tournament	1869	1870	1871	1872	1873	1874	1875	1876	1877
The Open Championship	3	3	NT	2	5	T18	6	2	T5

Note: Strath played only in The Open Championship.

Top 10
Did not play

NT = no tournament
"T" indicates a tie for a place
