= Young Tom Morris =

Scottish professional golfer (1851–1875)

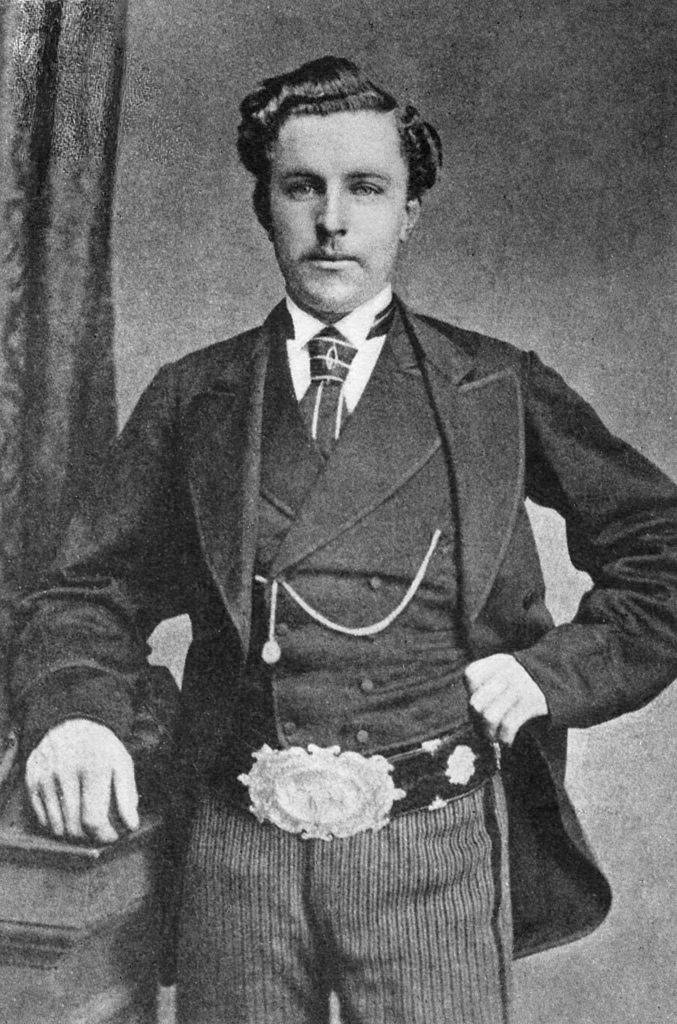
- Young Tom Morris wearing the Challenge Belt, c. 1873

Personal information
- Full name: Thomas Morris
- Nickname: Young Tom
- Nationality: Scotland
- Born: 20 April 1851 St Andrews, Fife, Scotland
- Died: 25 December 1875 (aged 24) St Andrews, Fife, Scotland
- Height: 5 ft 8 in (1.73 m)
- Spouse: Margaret Drinnen (or Drennan)

Career
- Sport: Golf
- Status: Professional

Best results in major championships (wins: 4)
- The Open Championship: Won: 1868, 1869, 1870, 1872

Achievements and awards
- World Golf Hall of Fame: 1975 (member page)

Thomas Morris (20 April 1851 – 25 December 1875), better known as Young Tom Morris, was a Scottish professional golfer. He is considered one of the pioneers of professional golf, and was the first young prodigy in golf history. He won four consecutive titles in the Open Championship, and did this by the age of 21.

Morris was born in St Andrews, the "Home of Golf", and died there on Christmas Day, 1875, aged 24. His father, Old Tom Morris, was the greenkeeper and professional of the St Andrews Links, and himself won four of the first eight Open Championships. Young Tom's first Open Championship win – in 1868 at age 17 – made him the youngest major champion, a record which still stands.

== Early life and education ==
For many years it was thought on the basis of a baptismal certificate that Morris was born on 10 May 1851, but in 2006 his birth certificate was discovered in Edinburgh. Morris moved with his family as an infant from St Andrews to Prestwick, where his father took a new position as the golf professional and greenkeeper.

Morris studied at Ayr Academy up to his early teens. The Morris family was becoming more prosperous, and hence able to afford the expensive private school fees, in the range of £15 per year. At the Academy, Morris studied with the sons of noblemen and wealthy businessmen, and would put his schooling to good use in his golf game and in his personal relationships.

== Early golf development ==
Morris learned golf from a young age over the Prestwick Golf Club links, which had been laid out by his father, the club's professional and greenkeeper, in 1851. He bypassed the caddying and clubmaking roles, which were the usual entry to golf for young players at that time; he was the first future top player to do this.

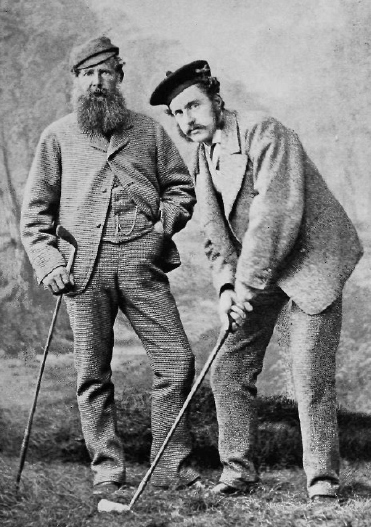
Old Tom Morris with Young Tom Morris, c. 1870-75

Morris beat his father for the first time at the age of 13 in 1864 in a friendly game at St Andrews; at the time his father was Open Champion. Morris, just before his 13th birthday, travelled with his father to a tournament at Perth, at the King James VI Golf Club, in April 1864, but was not allowed to compete in either the professional or amateur sections. The organisers instead arranged a match over the course with a local youth champion. Morris won this match decisively and was awarded a prize of five pounds, a significant amount at the time; the two young stars had been followed by a large gallery. His match score would have won the professional tournament.

== Young champion ==
Morris made his debut aged 14 in the Open Championship in 1865, performing creditably, but dropped out and failed to complete the event. He was placed 9th in 1866, 18 shots behind the winner, and in 1867 Morris was placed fourth in the Open Championship.

Also in 1867, the Morris duo travelled to Carnoustie Golf Links for a significant open tournament, which attracted a strong field of 32 players, the largest seen anywhere up to that time. Morris, at the age of 16, finished in a tie for first place, and then won the playoff over Willie Park Sr. (who would eventually win four Open Championships) and Bob Andrew. With this win, he came to general notice and acclaim for the first time.

== Champion of Scotland ==
Morris won the Open Championship in 1868, 1869, 1870, and 1872 (there was no Open Championship in 1871). No one else has since repeated this feat of four straight Open Championships. All four championships were played at Prestwick Golf Club, the course where he had learned golf as a youth.

Morris's 1868 win, at the age of 17, made him the youngest major champion in golf history, a record which still stands. That same year, his father finished second to him, a unique family occurrence in the Championship.

In 1869, Morris achieved the tournament's first ever hole-in-one by holing out at the 166-yard 8th hole: the scorecard is on display in Prestwick's clubhouse. In keeping with the Rules of the Tournament, Morris was allowed to keep the original Challenge Belt, made of red Moroccan leather with an engraved golf scene on its front silver buckle and funded by Prestwick's members, after his hat-trick of victories. The famous Claret Jug was purchased for the tournament in 1873, and his became the first name to be engraved on it, as he had won the Open Championship in 1872.

During his 1870 win, he began the tournament by scoring a 3 on the first hole of 578 yards, using hickory shafts and a guttie ball, holing a long fairway shot of about 200 yards; given the distances which were possible at that time, this may have been the first-ever albatross (double eagle), assuming a par of 6 for that hole; the term 'par' had not yet been formally invented. His first-round Open score in 1870 of 47 over the 12-hole Prestwick course was the first competitive round anywhere which averaged under four strokes per hole.

The Morris duo frequently competed as partners against all challengers for match stakes, winning most of the time, although their success rate dropped once Old Tom passed 50, as he sometimes struggled with his putting.

Morris also toured Scotland and parts of England, both on his own and with fellow golfer Davie Strath, playing exhibition matches on their own account, without official sanction; this was the first time this had been done. Morris and Strath received some criticism for this, as it challenged the established structure of competition at that time.

They were also the first players to insist on receiving money up front before a match was to be held; this was the foundation of appearance money, and prior to this the players were at the mercy of the result and the match's patrons. Morris also bet against members and other takers at St Andrews that he could score below a given standard over the Old Course, and won seven times straight. This form of betting was also an innovation at the time.

=== Breaks record over Old Course ===
Morris broke the course record over the Old Course at St Andrews by two strokes with a score of 77, to win an extended playoff over Musselburgh's star Bob Ferguson for the 1869 St Andrews Professional Tournament; this score then stood as the course record for 20 years. The previous mark of 79 (first set in 1858) had been scored by Allan Robertson and Old Tom Morris.

== Playing style ==
Morris stood about 5'8" with a sturdy, wiry build, and had very strong wrists. He gripped the club with an interlocking grip. He had a lengthy backswing, and generally swung quite hard on most of his longer shots, but kept some power in reserve. His long shots were usually low to medium in trajectory, and ran out to very good distances, comparable with most of his main rivals; this technique kept the ball in play, minimized trouble, and fought the wind very well. He was among the first players to intentionally shape shots to curve in flight for shot-making strategy. He invented a new use for the rut iron, a club designed to escape ruts from cart tracks on the course, not an unusual situation in the days before courses were extensively groomed. Morris used the rut iron (a lofted club similar to the modern sand wedge) as a pitching club for short approaches, hitting high shots over hazards, which sometimes landed with backspin, another innovation. This was a very difficult shot requiring great skill. Prior to this, the pure running approach, together with the chip-and-run, were the usual methods. He used the niblick (like a modern 9-iron) for similar purposes from farther away; iron play was developed significantly by his examples, which were taken up by rivals.

Morris was also an exceptional putter and chipper, virtually always giving the hole a chance, and he won many encounters with clutch short shots. One golf historian wrote that Morris missed fewer short putts than any player he had ever seen. His putting method was unusual: he took an open stance and played the ball very close to his right (back) foot. Morris managed his game well, generally choosing high-percentage shots and routes over more risky options (akin to his father's style), but was rarely afraid to take a calculated risk (being more daring than his father). Morris often was able to raise his game when the pressure increased. When on form, his game was complete and without weaknesses. He was the first golfer in that category, and one of no more than a handful throughout golf history.

== Personal life and death ==
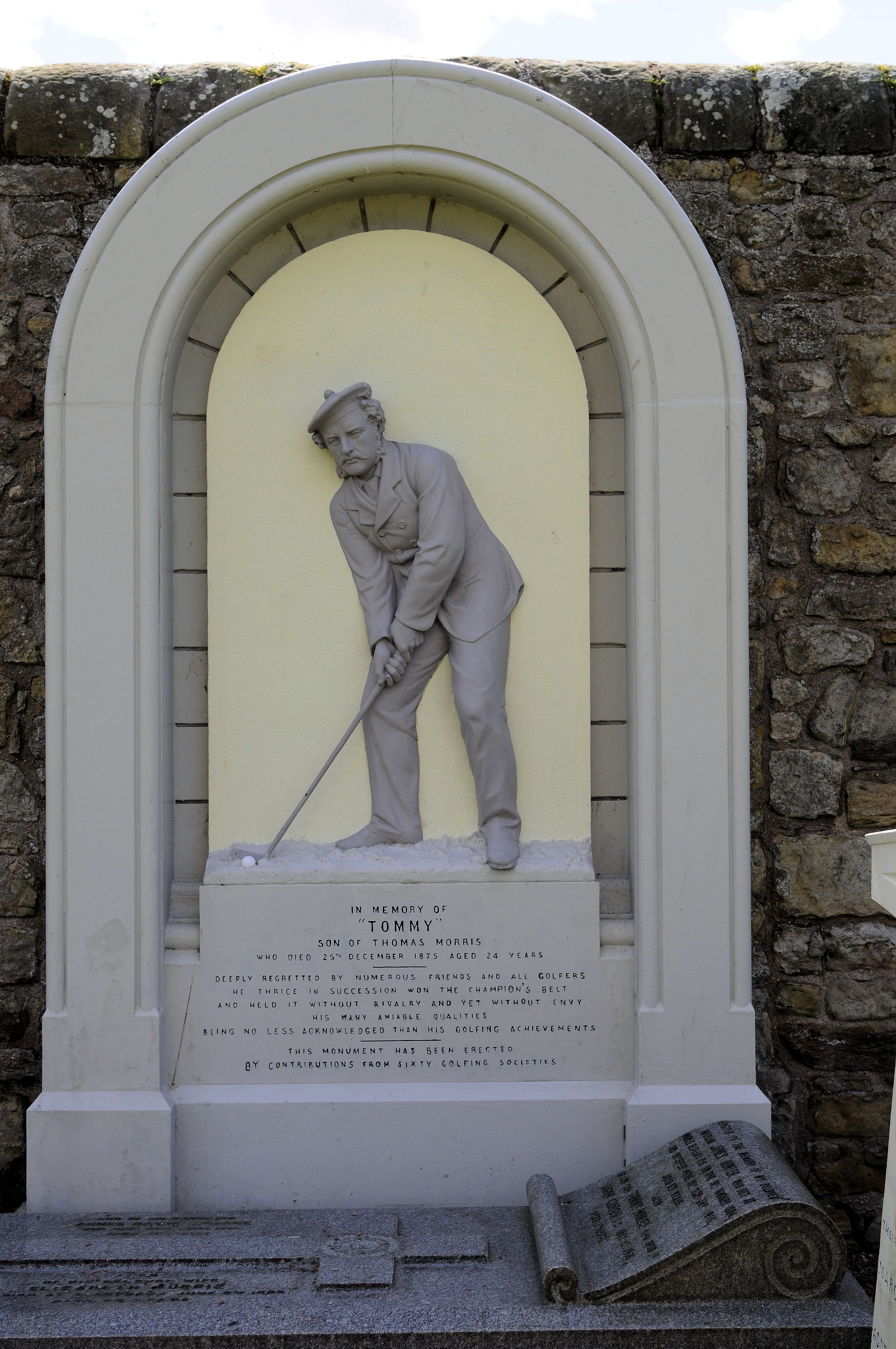
Grave memorial, St Andrews, Fife, which shows his name as simply "Tommy"

In a team match on 11 September 1875 at North Berwick, with the Morris duo facing brothers Willie and Mungo Park, Morris received a telegram from home requesting his immediate return; his pregnant wife, Margaret Drinnen, had gone into a difficult labour. Only two holes remained in the match; the Morris duo finished the match, winning, and hurried home by ship across the Firth of Forth and up the coast, but when Morris got there, both his wife and newborn baby had died. Morris was heart-broken. Not quite four months later, on Christmas Day, he died at the age of 24. The official cause of death, according to his death certificate, was pulmonary hemorrhage causing apnea. Morris had played and won a marathon challenge match in terrible weather a few weeks earlier, and this may have weakened him.

== Legacy ==
Morris was a tremendous golf innovator who raised the playing standard significantly, and this, together with his aggressive promotion of his own skills, led to an enormous increase in the popularity of golf for spectators. Some of his challenge matches attracted thousands of spectators from all over Scotland. Such was the interest that major London newspapers and magazines sent correspondents to Scotland, a 400-mile trip by rail, to cover his challenge matches in the 1870s. Although Morris won a very high percentage of his matches and tournaments, he managed to minimise animosity among rivals, who had to improve their own games to stay competitive. He had a friendly personality, and was widely respected.

Morris was ranked the 14th best golfer of all time in a survey published in Golf Magazine, September 2009. He was the top player whose career was entirely in the 19th century. His father, Old Tom, was ranked 19th.

== Awards and honors ==
In 1975, Morris was inducted into the World Golf Hall of Fame.

== Professional wins (4) ==
- 1868 Open Championship
- 1869 Open Championship
- 1870 Open Championship
- 1872 Open Championship

== Major championship ==
=== Wins (4) ===
Year	Championship	24 holes	Winning score	Margin	Runner(s)-up
1868	The Open Championship	1 shot deficit	51-54-49=154	3 strokes	(Scotland) Old Tom Morris
1869	The Open Championship (2)	4 shot lead	50-55-52=157	11 strokes	(Scotland) Bob Kirk
1870	The Open Championship (3)	5 shot lead	47-51-51=149	12 strokes	(Scotland) Davie Strath, (Scotland) Bob Kirk
1872	The Open Championship (4)	5 shot deficit	57-56-53=166	3 strokes	(Scotland) Davie Strath

=== Results timeline ===
Tournament	1865	1866	1867	1868	1869	1870	1871	1872	1873	1874
The Open Championship	WD	9	4	1	1	1	NT	1	T3	2

- Note: The Open Championship was the only major played during Morris's lifetime.
Win
Top 10

NT = No tournament
WD = Withdrew
"T" indicates a tie for a place

== Depictions in film and print ==
The 2016 film Tommy's Honour depicts the lives and careers of Old Tom (Peter Mullan) and Young Tom (Jack Lowden), and focuses on their complex and bittersweet relationship. It is based on Kevin Cook's Herbert Warren Wind Book Award–winning 2007 biography, Tommy's Honor: The Story of Old Tom Morris and Young Tom Morris, Golf's Founding Father and Son.
