= William Miller =

William, Willie, Will, Bill, or Billy Miller may refer to:

== Art ==
- William Miller (engraver) (1796–1882), Scottish line engraver
- William Rickarby Miller (1818–1893), American painter
- William Edwards Miller (1851–1940), British artist and collector
- Christian William Miller (1921–1995), American artist and model born William Miller
- Bill Miller (artist) (born 1962), American artist
- Billy the Artist (William Miller, 1964–2022), American artist

== Business ==
- Bill Miller (British businessman) (1928–2020), vice-chairman of Bristol-Myers Squibb and philanthropist
- Bill Miller (investor) (born 1950), chairman and former chief investment officer of Legg Mason Capital Management
- William Starr Miller II (1856–1935), New York industrialist in the early 20th century
- William White Miller (1846–1912), Irish Canadian businessman

== Film, stage, and television ==
- Bill Miller (impresario) (1904–2002), Russian-born American impresario
- Bill Miller (film producer) (born 1960), Australian film producer
- Billy Miller (actor) (1979–2023), American actor, best known for roles on The Young and the Restless and General Hospital
- Ranger Bill Miller (1878–1939), American actor
- Will Miller (therapist) (born 1949), American ordained minister, Nick at Nite's resident television therapist
- William Miller (actor, born 1978), actor based primarily in Spain
- William Miller (footballer, born 1996), English child actor and footballer
- William Miller (sound engineer), British re-recording mixer
- William Miller (Almost Famous character), fictional character in the 2000 film Almost Famous

== Government ==
=== United States ===
- Bill Miller (diplomat), director of the Diplomatic Security Service
- G. William Miller (1925–2006), secretary of the Treasury and Federal Reserve Board chairman
- William Miller (North Carolina politician) (c. 1783–1825), North Carolina governor, 1814–1817
- Bill Miller (North Carolina politician) (1929–2022), member of the North Carolina Senate
- William Miller (Indiana politician) (1809–1879), member of the Indiana House of Representatives
- William Miller (mayor) (1821–1901), mayor of South Bend, Indiana
- William Miller (Texas politician), member of the Twenty-first Texas Legislature
- William E. Miller (1914–1983), Republican vice presidential nominee in 1964, congressman
- William E. Miller (Iowa judge), justice of the Iowa Supreme Court
- William Ernest Miller (1908–1976), federal judge
- William F. Miller (politician) (1869–1954), Wisconsin state assemblyman
- William Green Miller (1931–2019), ambassador to Ukraine
- William H. H. Miller (1840–1917), US attorney general, 1889–1893
- William Henry Miller (legislator) (1829–1870), congressman from Pennsylvania
- William J. Miller (1899–1950), congressman from Connecticut
- Fishbait Miller (William Moseley Miller, 1909–1989), doorkeeper of the US House of Representatives
- William N. Miller (1855–1928), justice of the Supreme Court of Appeals of West Virginia
- William Read Miller (1823–1887), governor of Arkansas
- William S. Miller (1793–1854), congressman from New York
- William T. Miller (Illinois politician)

=== United Kingdom ===
- William Miller, Lord Glenlee (1755–1846), MP for Edinburgh 1790–81, judge in Scotland from 1795
- William Henry Miller (book collector) (1789–1848), MP for Newcastle-under-Lyme
- Sir William Miller, 1st Baronet (1809–1887), British vice-consul at St. Petersburg, 1842–1854, member of parliament for Leith
- William Thomas Miller (1865–1930), MP in the Northern Ireland Parliament for Fermanagh and Tyrone and North Tyrone
- Bill Miller (Scottish politician) (born 1954), former Labour MEP

=== Canada ===
- William Miller (Canadian politician) (1835–1912)
- William Willoughby Miller (1880–1959), politician in Saskatchewan

=== Australia ===
- William Miller (South Australian politician) (1850–1922), Australian politician who represented the electoral district of Burra Burra

== Military ==
- William E. Miller (soldier, born 1836) (1836–1919), American Civil War Union soldier and Medal of Honor recipient
- William Miller (Peruvian general) (1795–1861), British general known in Latin America as Guillermo Miller, fought beside Simón Bolívar
- William Miller (Confederate Army officer) (1820–1909), in the Confederate general during the American Civil War
- William Miller (RAF officer) (1892–1962), World War I flying ace

== Music ==
- Bill Miller (musician, born 1955) (born 1955), Native American singer and songwriter
- Bill Miller (pianist) (1915–2006), close collaborator with Frank Sinatra
- Billy Miller (musician) (1954–2016), rock 'n' roll collector and archivist
- Billy Miller (Australian musician), former member of Australian band The Ferrets
- William Miller (American publisher), 19th-century music publisher
- Mr. Stress (1943-2015), stage name of Cleveland-based blues artist Bill Miller

== Religion ==
- William Miller (Australian Presbyterian minister) (1815–1874), served the Free Presbyterian Church of Victoria in Australia
- William Miller (missionary) (1838–1923), Free Church of Scotland missionary to Madras and educationalist
- William Miller (preacher) (1782–1849), founder of the Millerite Movement
- William McElwee Miller (1892–1993), author, Presbyterian minister, missionary to Persia (Iran)

== Science and education ==
- William Allen Miller (1817–1870), British chemist
- William F. Miller (1925–2017), American professor of management and of computer science
- William Hallowes Miller (1801–1880), British mineralogist and crystallographer
- William Hughes Miller (born 1941), American chemistry professor
- William Ian Miller (born 1946), American law professor
- William L. Miller (1943–2020), Scottish political scientist
- William Lash Miller (1866–1940), Canadian chemistry professor
- William Miller (historian) (1864–1945), English historian and journalist
- William P. Miller (college president), president of Weber State University, 1962–1972
- William Richard Miller (born 1947), American professor of psychology at the University of New Mexico
- William T. Miller (1911–1998), American chemistry professor

== Sports ==
=== Association football ===
- Bill Miller (footballer, born 1890) (1890–?), English footballer (Brighton & Hove Albion)
- Bill Miller (footballer, born 1908) (1908–1974), English footballer (Luton Town, Southport)
- William Miller (1870s footballer) (died 1894), Scottish footballer (Third Lanark, Scotland national team)
- William Miller (footballer, born 1875) (1875–1915), Scottish footballer
- William Miller (footballer, born 1996), English footballer and former child actor
- Willie Miller (born 1955), Scottish football player, manager and director (Aberdeen, Scotland national team)
- Willie Miller (footballer, born 1895) (1895–1970), Scottish football player (Hibernian)
- Willie Miller (footballer, born 1910) (1910–1978), Scottish football player (Partick Thistle, Burnley)
- Willie Miller (footballer, born 1924) (1924–2005), Scottish goalkeeper (Celtic, Scotland national team)
- Willie Miller (footballer, born 1969), Scottish football player (Hibernian)

=== Australian rules football ===
- Bill Miller (Australian footballer) (1936–1986), player for Geelong
- Billy Miller (Australian footballer) (1884–1970), player for Geelong
- William Miller (Australian footballer) (1881–1912), South Australian footballer for Norwood

=== Gridiron football ===
- Bill Miller (American football coach, born 1931) (1931–2006), American college football head coach at Southwest Texas State University
- Bill Miller (American football coach, born 1956), American college football assistant coach
- Bill Miller (wide receiver) (1940–2024), American football wide receiver in the American Football League
- Billy Miller (American football) (born 1977), American football tight end in the National Football League
- Willie Miller (American football) (born 1947)
- William Miller (gridiron football) (1957–2019), American running back in the Canadian Football League and United States Football League

=== Baseball ===
- Bill Miller (outfielder) (1879–1957), Major League Baseball player
- Bill Miller (right-handed pitcher) (1910–1982), Major League Baseball player
- Bill Miller (left-handed pitcher) (1927–2003), Major League Baseball player
- William Miller (first baseman) (fl. 19th century), National Association baseball player
- Bill Miller (umpire) (born 1967), Major League Baseball umpire
- Bill Mueller, Major League Baseball player whose last name was pronounced Miller

=== Basketball ===
- Bill Miller (basketball) (1924–1991), American NBA player and college head coach
- Willie Miller (basketball) (born 1977), professional basketball player for the PBA

=== Rowing ===
- Will Miller (rower) (born 1984), American Olympic rower
- William Miller (rower, born 1905) (1905–1985), American Olympic rower
- William Miller (rower, born 1947), American Olympic rower

=== Track and field ===
- Bill Miller (javelin thrower) (1930–2016), Olympian athlete in the javelin throw
- Bill Miller (pole vaulter) (1912–2008), American Olympic pole vaulter
- Bill Miller (discus thrower) (1927–1997), American discus thrower, 1949 All-American for the Ohio State Buckeyes track and field team

=== Other sports ===
- Bill Miller (bowls) (1910–2004), American lawn bowler
- Bill Miller (ice hockey) (1908–1986), Canadian hockey player
- Bill Miller (lacrosse) (born c. 1967), American lacrosse player
- Dr. Bill Miller (1927–1997), American professional wrestler
- Billy Miller (water polo) (born 1988), Australian water polo player
- Will Miller (rugby union) (born 1993), Australian rugby union player
- William Miller (Australian athlete) (1846–1939), champion in boxing, fencing, wrestling and weight-lifting
- William Miller (cricketer, born 1817), English cricketer
- William Miller (cricketer, born 1905) (1905–1974), Australian cricketer
- William Miller (golfer) (1839–?), Scottish amateur golfer

== Writing and publishing ==
- H. Bill Miller (1920–1961), mystery co-author with Bob Wade
- William Miller (British publisher) (1769–1844)
- William Miller (historian) (1864–1945), British expatriate journalist and medieval historian
- William Miller (poet) (1810–1872), Scottish poet, writer of Wee Willie Winkie
- William Miller (typographer), Scottish type-founder, working in Edinburgh from c. 1808 and associated with Scotch Roman
- William Burke Miller (1904–1983), newspaper and radio journalist
- William H. Miller (writer) (born 1948), maritime historian
- William Henry Miller (book collector) (1789–1848), book collector and UK parliamentarian
- William Lee Miller (1926–2012), American journalist and historian

== Other people ==
- William Dawes Miller (1918–1993), American engineer
- William Henry Miller (architect) (1848–1922), American architect
- William R. Miller (architect) (1866–1929), American architect
- William Miller (cashier), chief cashier of the Bank of England, 1864–1866
- William Miller (criminal) (1906–1931), American bank robber and outlaw
- William Christopher Miller (1898–c. 1976), British veterinarian
- William Herbert Miller Jr. (1932–1988), American philatelist
- Willie Miller (urbanist) (1950–2021), British urban planner

== Other uses ==
- USS William C. Miller, an Evarts-class destroyer escort in the US Navy

== See also ==
- William Millar (disambiguation)
- William E. Miller (disambiguation)
- William Edward Miller (disambiguation)
- William Henry Miller (disambiguation)
- William J. Miller (disambiguation)
- William Mueller (disambiguation)
