= Initiation =

Rite-of-passage ceremony

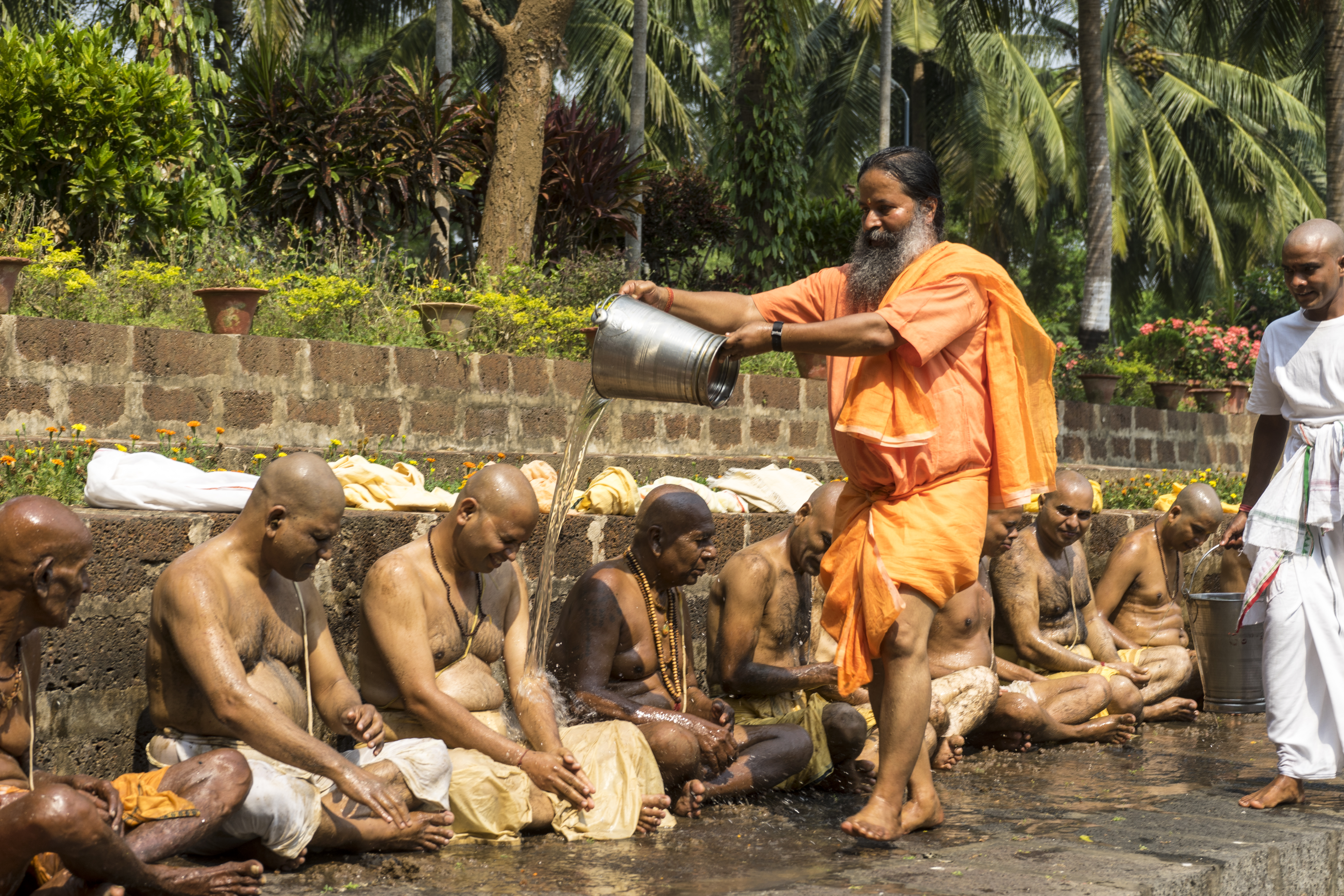
New monks of Kriya Yoga are renamed by their guru during the three-day initiation ceremony in Amarkantak, Annupur, India, 2016.

Initiation is a rite of passage marking entrance or acceptance into a group or society. It could also be a formal admission to adulthood in a community or one of its formal components. In a broad sense, it can also signify a transformation in which the initiate is 'reborn' into a new role. Examples of initiation ceremonies might include Christian baptism or confirmation, Jewish bar or bat mitzvah, acceptance into a fraternal organization, secret society or religious order, or graduation from school or recruit training. A person taking the initiation ceremony in traditional rites is called an initiate.

== Characteristics ==
William Ian Miller notes the role of ritual humiliation in comic ordering and testing.

Mircea Eliade discussed initiation as a principal religious act by classical or traditional societies. He defined initiation as "a basic change in existential condition", which liberates man from profane time and history. "Initiation recapitulates the sacred history of the world. And through this recapitulation, the whole world is sanctified anew... [the initiand] can perceive the world as a sacred work, a creation of the Gods."

Eliade differentiates between types of initiations in two ways: types and functions.

=== Reasons for and functions ===
- "this real valuation of ritual death finally led to conquest of the fear of real death."
- "[initiation's] function is to reveal the deep meaning of existence to the new generations and to help them assume the responsibility of being truly men and hence of participating in culture."
- "it reveals a world open to the trans-human, a world that, in our philosophical terminology, we should call transcendental."
- "to make [the initiand] open to spiritual values."

=== Types ===
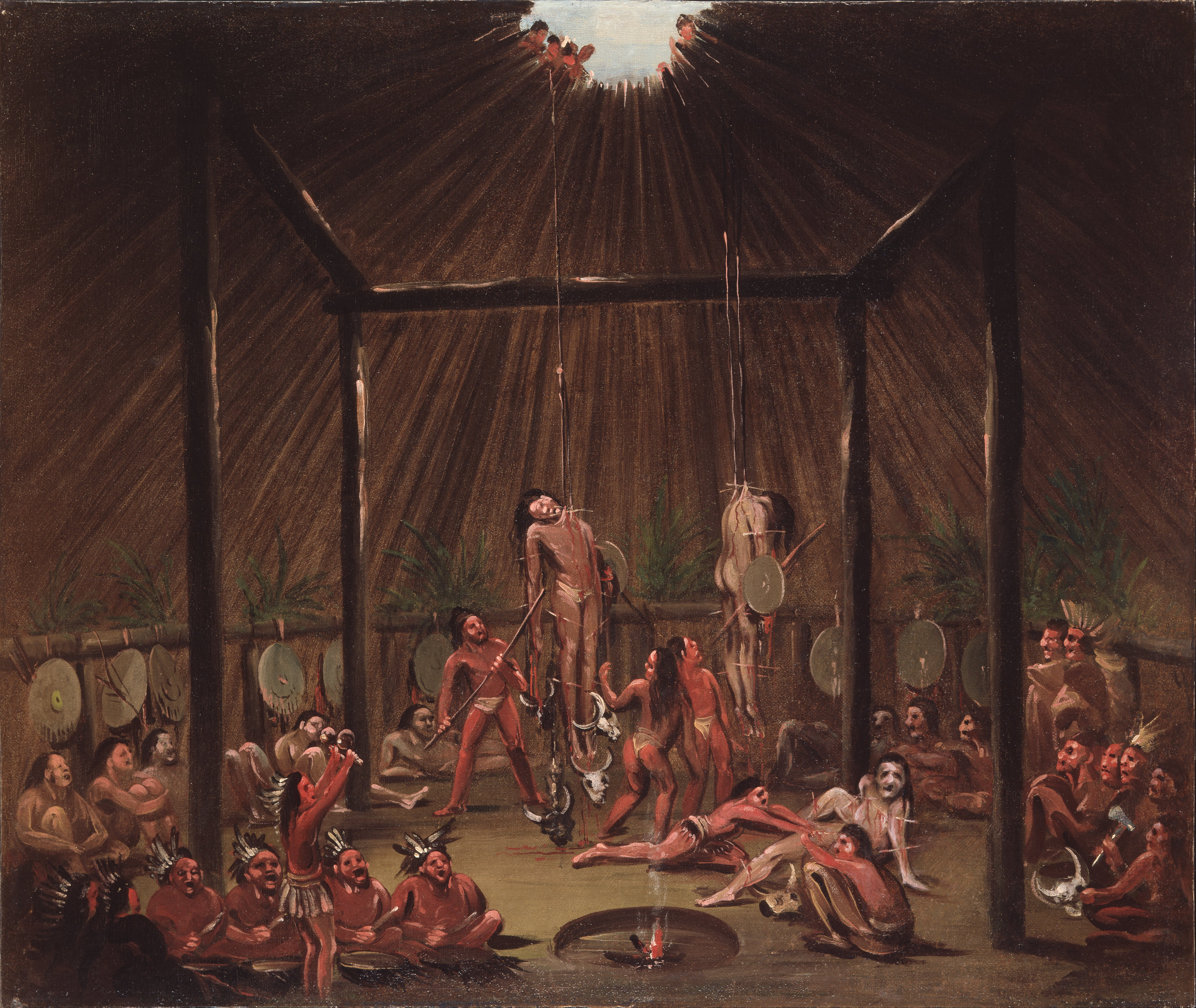
The Okipa ceremony was a test for young Mandan men to prove themselves as warriors. The ceremony as witnessed by George Catlin, circa 1832

- Puberty rites: "collective rituals whose function is to effect the transition from childhood or adolescence to adulthood." They represent "above all the revelation of the sacred."
- Entering into a Secret Society
- Mystical vocation: "the vocation of a medicine man or a shaman." This is limited to the few who are "destined to participate in a more intense religious experience than is accessible to the rest of the community."

These can be broken into two types:

- puberty rites, "by virtue of which adolescents gain access to the sacred, to knowledge, and to sexuality-- by which, in short, they become human beings."
- specialized initiations, which certain individuals undergo in order to transcend their human condition and become protégés of the Supernatural Beings or even their equals."

=== Psychological ===
In the study of certain social forms of initiation, such as hazing in college fraternities and sororities, laboratory experiments in psychology suggest that severe initiations produce cognitive dissonance. Dissonance is then thought to produce feelings of strong group attraction among initiates after the experience, because they want to justify the effort used.

Rewards during initiations have important consequences in that initiates who feel more rewarded express stronger group identity. As well as group attraction, initiations can also produce conformity among new members. Psychology experiments have also shown that initiations increase feelings of affiliation.

== Examples ==
=== Religious and spiritual ===
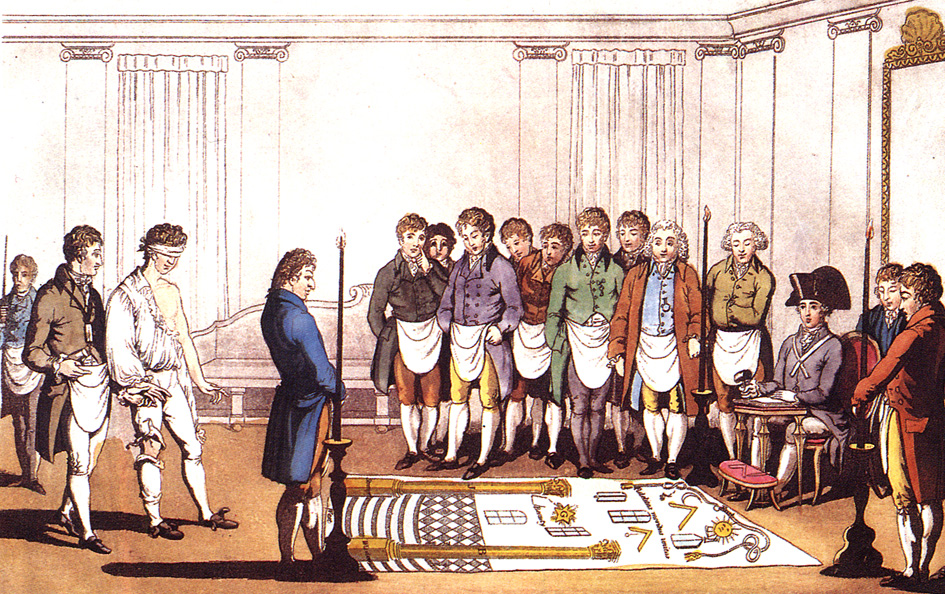
Freemasonry initiation. 18th century

A spiritual initiation rite normally implies a shepherding process where those who are at a higher level guide the initiate through a process of greater exposure of knowledge. This may include the revelation of secrets, hence the term secret society for such organizations, usually reserved for those at the higher level of understanding. One famous historical example is the Eleusinian Mysteries of ancient Greece, thought to go back to at least the Mycenaean period or "Bronze Age".

In the context of ritual magic and esotericism, an initiation is considered to cause a fundamental process of change to begin within the person being initiated and its "evolution operates within both the material world and the spiritual world". The person conducting the initiation (the initiator), being in possession of a certain power or state of being, transfers this power or state to the person being initiated. Thus the concept of initiation is similar to that of apostolic succession. The initiation process is often likened to a simultaneous death and rebirth, because as well as being a beginning it also implies an ending as existence on one level drops away in an ascension to the next. Initiation is a key component of Judaism, Sufism and Shiism, Vaishnavism, Sant Mat, Surat Shabd Yoga, Vajrayana Buddhism, Wicca, and similar religious gnostic traditions. It denotes acceptance by the Guru and also implies that the Chela (student or disciple) agrees to the requirements (such as living an ethical lifestyle, meditating, etc.)

One of the most recognized religious initiation rites is baptism within Christianity. Christian baptism is seen as both part of the individual's faith and conversion as well as their initiation into the Church.

In the modern version of the Roman religion, some of the communities use a form of the rite of Aries described in the book Introduction to Magic, by the Italian Fascist Julius Evola. This rite is also used by the Brotherhood of Myriam albeit with some minor differences. The rite symbolises the rebirth of the soul in spring in accordance with the cosmic and natural rhythms and corresponds to the Christian Easter, which is claimed to be a derivate of the rite of Aries.

In the book Pietas: An Introduction to Roman Traditionalism, the author makes the claim that the Rite of Aries, corresponds to the ancient Minvervalia where the young Romans would go through their initiation and be introduced to the public cult.

=== Naval and military ===
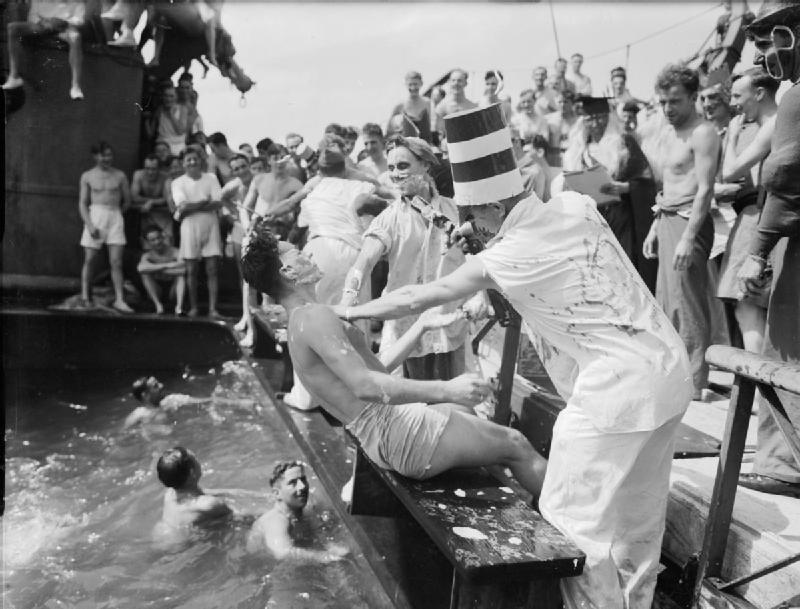
Equator crossing ceremony on Empress of Australia, August 1941

Some communities on board a military vessel and also of military soldiers tend to form a closed 'family' which absorbs in members, who are often formally accepted, generally after a form of trial or hazing.

In addition, there can be similar rites of passages associated with parts of naval and military life, which do not constitute true initiations as the participants are already and remain members of the same community. One such rite is associated with crossing the equator on board a naval ship, but it can even be taken by passengers on board a cruise liner, who are not and do not become members of anything but the so-called "equator crossing club". Another form, "Kissing the Royal Belly" or "Royal Baby", calls for initiates to kneel before a senior member of the crew, who wears a mock diaper. This "Baby" usually has a huge stomach covered with greasy materials ranging from cooking oil to mustard, shaving cream, eggs, and oysters. Junior sailors must lick the Baby's navel area, while the "baby" grabs and shakes their head to better smear the goo onto their faces.

=== Gang ===
Gangs often require new members to commit crimes before accepting them as part of the gang. New members may be physically beaten by fellow gang members to demonstrate their courage, also known as "beat-in" or "jump-in", which occasionally results in a fatality. One study indicates that young people are more likely to be hurt in gang initiation than they are by refusing to join. Female members may be required to have sex with male members as a form of initiation, also known as "sex in", though they may also be "jumped-in" like their male counterparts. One study shows that female members who were "sexed-in" as part of gang initiation were thereafter viewed with lower respect than those that were "jumped-in", even when promised they would become full-fledged members. Another study found that sexed-in members face greater risks of sexual exploitation and abuse by fellow male members.

=== Tribal ===
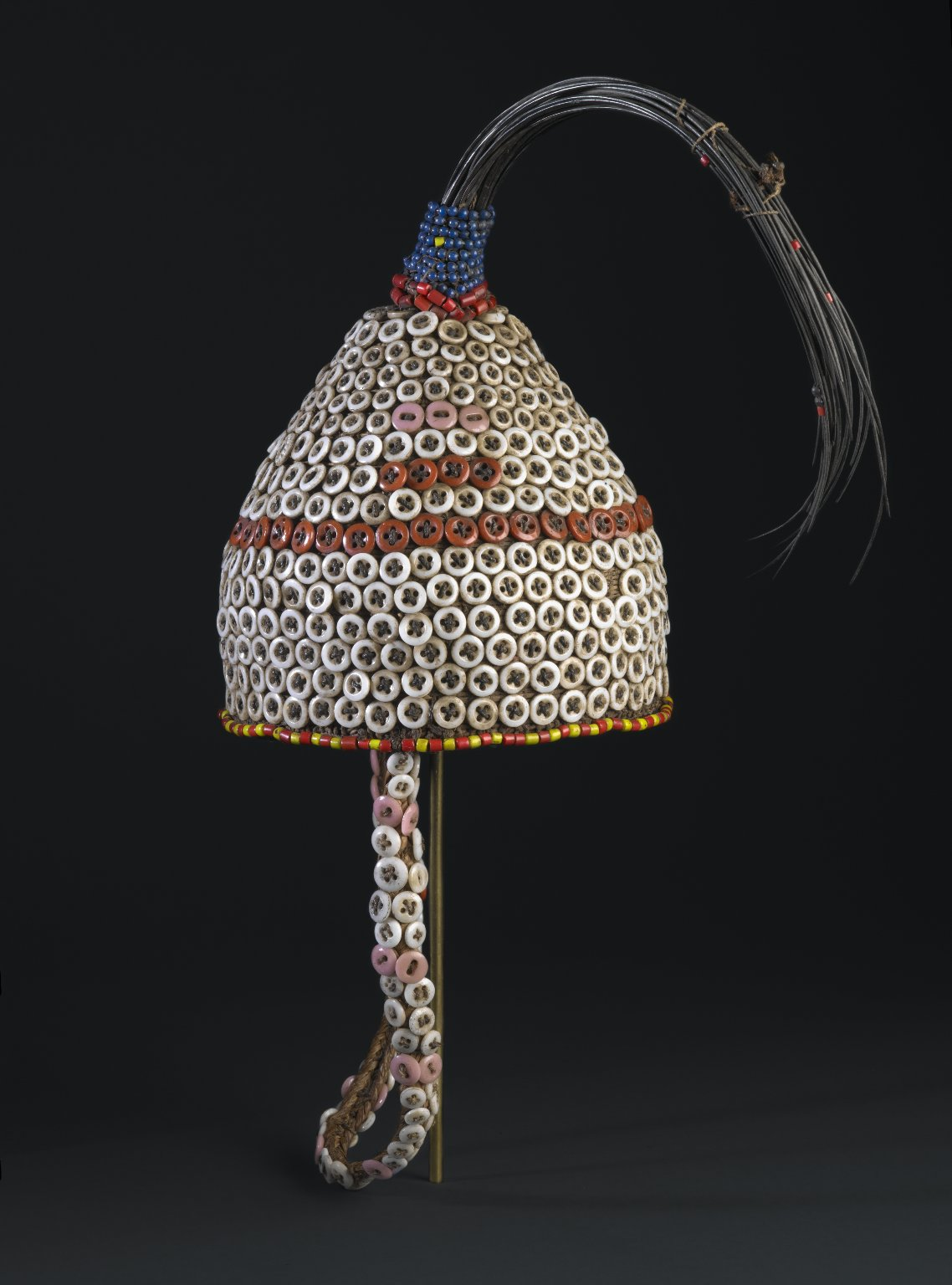
This hat would only have been worn by initiates to Kindi, the highest level of Bwami. Tail hair of an elephant, a metaphor for Kindi, crowns the hat. European-made buttons began to replace cowrie shells as prestige items on such Bwami paraphernalia as the Western presence grew in eastern Congo in the early twentieth century

Tribes often have initiations. The initiation done in the Bapedi tribe of South Africa is normally regarded as a stage where a boy is to be taught manhood and a girl to be taught womanhood. In many African tribes, initiation involves circumcision/genital mutilation of males and sometimes circumcision/genital mutilation of females as well. Initiation is considered necessary for the individual to be regarded as a full member of the tribe. Otherwise, the individual may not be allowed to participate in ceremonies or even in social rituals such as marriage. A man will not be allowed to marry or have any special relationship with a woman who did not go to an initiation, because she is not considered to be a woman.

Initiation may be thought of as an event which may help teens prepare themselves to be good husbands and wives. Where modernization is occurring, initiation is not taken so seriously as before, although there are still certain areas which still perform initiations.

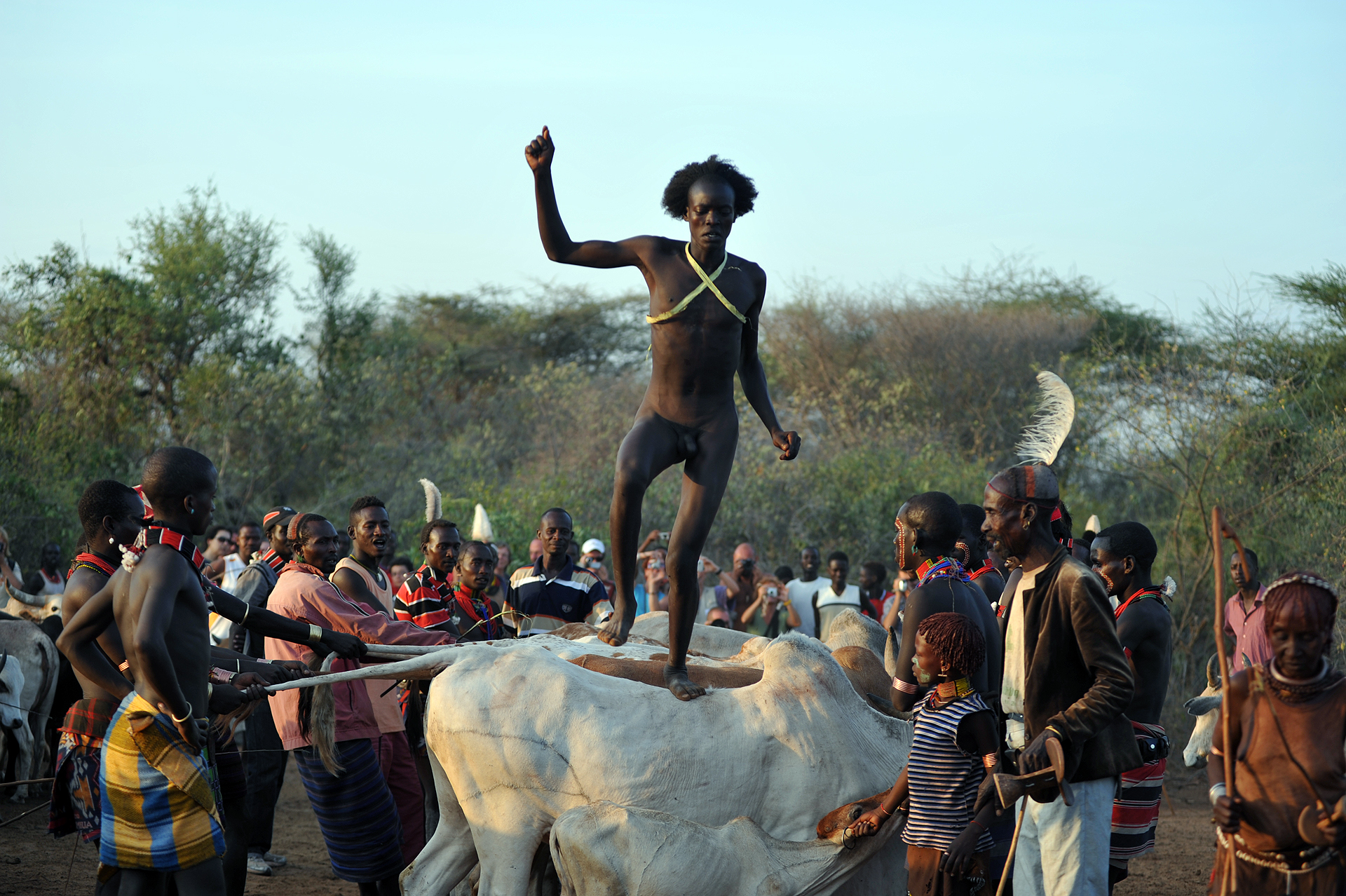
The bull jumping ceremony of the Hamar tribe in Ethiopia

In some African tribes, boys take about 3–4 months participating in initiation rites and girls take about 1–2 months.

Australian Aboriginal tribes usually had long periods of time to help prepare adolescent boys, teaching them traditional lore before they were ready to attend large elaborate ceremonies at the time of initiation when they were finally recognized as full-fledged men in their society. Most tribes had circumcision and scarification as part of the male initiation rituals, while many Central Australian tribes also practiced subincision.

A salient shared cultural feature of the Min peoples of the New Guinea Highlands is initiation into a secret male religious cult. For example, the Urapmin people used to practice a type of male initiation known in Urap as ban. These elaborate rituals were a central part of Urapmin social life. The ban was a multistage process which involved beatings and manipulation of various objects. At each stage, the initiate was offered revelations of secret knowledge (Urap: weng awem), but at the next stage these would be shown to be false (Urap: famoul). These initiations were abandoned with the adoption of Christianity, and the Urap have expressed relief at no longer having to administer the beatings which were involved.

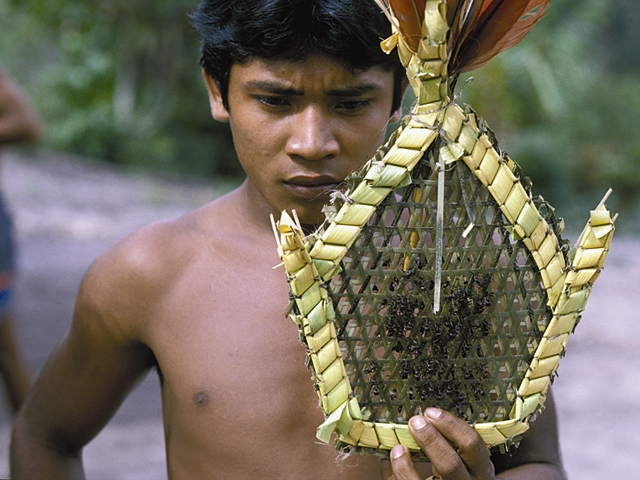
A young Sataré-Mawé with a rite of passage instrument

The Sateré-Mawé people of Brazil use intentional bullet ant stings as part of their initiation rites to become warriors.

Among the various Austronesian peoples, head-hunting raids were strongly tied to the practice of tattooing. In head-hunting societies, tattoos were records of how many heads the warriors had taken in battle, and was part of the initiation rites into adulthood.

The Sande society in West Africa initiates girls into adulthood by rituals including female genital mutilation.

=== Historical China ===
Chinese boys, under the Rites of Zhou, initiate their adulthood when they are 20 years old (加冠) and girls when they are 15 (及笄). Yili (儀禮), a text in the chapter of the rites(?) (士冠禮) describes various details of the ceremonies involved.

Nearing the late parts of the ceremony, the initiate gains an alias, or a "Courtesy name"; thereafter use of their personal name is strictly prohibited except before parents and rulers.

== See also ==
- Hazing
- Ulwaluko
