= William Edward Miller =

William Edward Miller may refer to:

- William Edward Miller (judge) (1823–1897), justice of the Iowa Supreme Court
- William Edward Miller (New York politician) (1914–1983), American politician who served in the United States House of Representatives.
- William Edward Miller (soldier, born 1836) (1836–1919), Pennsylvania state senator from 1899 to 1902, Captain in the civil war

== See also ==
- William Miller (disambiguation)
- William E. Miller (disambiguation)
- William Edwards Miller (1851–1940), British painter
