= William E. Miller (disambiguation) =

William E. Miller (1914–1983) was an American politician who served in the US House of Representatives.

William E. Miller may also refer to:

- William E. Miller (Iowa judge) (1823–1897), justice of the Iowa Supreme Court
- William E. Miller (soldier, born 1836) (1836–1919), American soldier and politician
- William E. Miller (therapist) or Will Miller (born 1949), American therapist, comedian, Protestant minister, and television personality
- William Edward Miller (Canadian football) (1957–2019), American gridiron football player in the Canadian Football League
- William Edwards Miller (1851–1940), British artist and collector
- William Ernest Miller (1908–1976), United States federal judge

== See also ==
- William Miller (disambiguation)
- William Edward Miller (disambiguation)
