= Lynn Cullen =

American radio host (born 1948)

- Born: Ida Lynn Miller; January 18, 1948 (age 78); Wisconsin
- Education: University of Wisconsin–Madison
- Occupation: Talk show host
- Spouse: William Lee Cullen (m. 1972; div. 1980)
- Presenting career
- Show: Live at Five (1978 – 1980)
- Station: WISC-TV
- Show: The Pennsylvania Game (1986 – 1993, guest; 1993 – '94, host)
- Station: WITF-TV
- Country: United States

Lynn Cullen (born Ida Lynn Miller, January 18, 1948) is an American liberal radio talk show host in Pittsburgh, Pennsylvania.

== Career ==
Cullen hosts an internet radio talk show on the Pittsburgh City Paper's website on weekdays from 10 - 11 am. She was also a regular panelist on WQED (TV)'s Friday evening program, 4802. until leaving the show in 2015. Prior to this, Cullen was briefly on radio station WAMO-AM 860 weekdays from 5-7 p.m. EST. As of May 15, 2009, WAMO and several sister stations are in the process of being sold, and Cullen and all other employees were abruptly laid off. On July 7, 2009, it was announced that she will broadcast a one-hour Internet radio show on the Pittsburgh City Paper's website starting on August 18, 2009

From 1999 until a format change in August 2008, Cullen was a radio talk show host on radio station WPTT AM 1360.

Cullen's reporting for WTAE-TV from 1981 to 1992 garnered her numerous awards, including a 1991 Emmy award, four Golden Quills for Journalistic Excellence from the Pittsburgh Press Club, and three Pennsylvania Associated Press Broadcaster Awards for feature reporting.

Cullen hosted a radio talk show on WTAE Radio from 1987 to 1997 and was twice named "Best Talk Show Host" in Pittsburgh by the readers of both Pittsburgh Magazine and In Pittsburgh Newsweekly. Vectors Pittsburgh honored her as the 1997 Person of the Year in Communications, and the Squirrel Hill Urban Coalition similarly honored her as its Person of the Year in 1998.

Cullen also hosted two weekly public television programs: the statewide award-winning quiz show The Pennsylvania Game and the prime-time public affairs program Cullen-Devlin on WQEX-TV.

The Pittsburgh Post-Gazette named Cullen one of Pittsburgh's fifty most influential cultural power brokers. She is listed in Who's Who of American Women and Who's Who in American Media.

Before moving to Pittsburgh in 1981, Cullen was a television anchor and reporter at WISC-TV, the CBS affiliate in Madison, Wisconsin. She attended Green Bay East High School, the Neighborhood Playhouse School of the Theatre in New York City, Northwestern University and the University of Wisconsin–Madison where she received her degree in journalism.

== Personal life ==
Cullen is the sister of author and University of Michigan Law School professor William Ian Miller. She acquired her professional surname via marriage to William Lee Cullen on June 4, 1972. By the time the couple divorced on November 10, 1980, she was already well established as Lynn Cullen, news anchor and talk show host.
