= WPGP =

Talk radio station in Pittsburgh

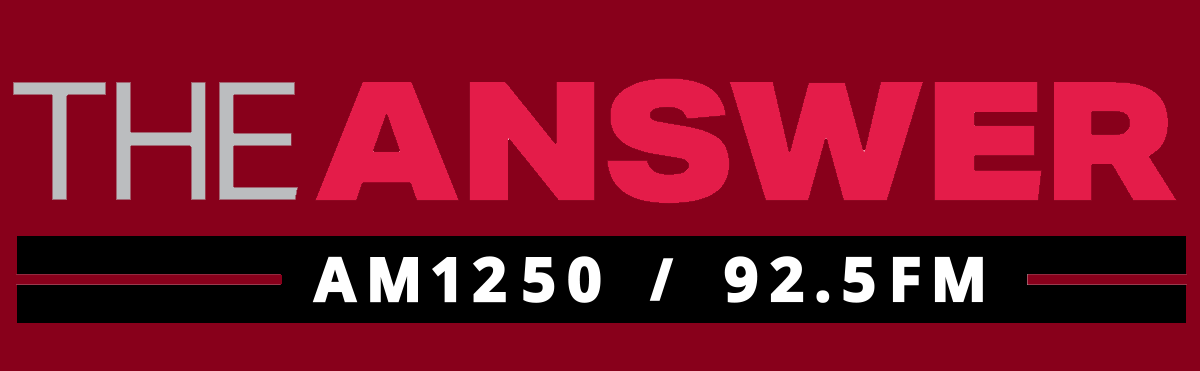
- Pittsburgh, Pennsylvania; United States
- Broadcast area: Pittsburgh metropolitan area
- Frequency: 1250 kHz
- Branding: AM 1250 The Answer

Programming
- Language: English
- Format: Conservative talk radio
- Affiliations: Compass Media Networks; Salem Radio Network; Townhall News

Ownership
- Owner: Salem Media Group; (Salem Communications Holding Corporation)
- Sister stations: WORD-FM; WPIT

History
- First air date: May 4, 1922
- Former call signs: WCAE (1922–1961); WRYT (1961–1966); WTAE (1966–1998); WEAE (1998–2010); WDDZ (2011–2015)
- Former frequencies: 833 kHz (1922); 750 kHz (1922–1923); 650 kHz (1923–1927); 560 kHz (1927); 650 kHz (1927–1928); 1220 kHz (1928–1941)
- Call sign meaning: Pittsburgh, Pennsylvania

Technical information
- Licensing authority: FCC
- Facility ID: 65691
- Class: B
- Power: 5,000 watts
- Transmitter coordinates: 40°23′50.00″N 79°57′43.00″W
- Translator: 92.5 W223CS (Pittsburgh)

Links
- Public license information: Public file; LMS
- Webcast: Listen live Listen live (via Audacy)
- Website: www.theanswerpgh.com

WPGP (1250 AM) is a radio station in Pittsburgh, Pennsylvania, United States, broadcasting with a power output of 5,000 watts. The station is owned and operated by the Salem Media Group.

== History ==
The station is one of the five original Pittsburgh stations, signing on May 4, 1922, as WCAE. It was originally owned by the Pittsburgh department store Kaufmann & Baer's, and operated on 833 kHz (as all stations did at that time); the call letters were randomly assigned from a sequential roster of available call signs. It moved to 750 kHz in December and to 650 in May 1923. Kaufmann and Baer's was purchased in 1925 by Gimbels; this made WCAE the company's third radio station, after WIP in Philadelphia and WGBS in New York City. The station became an affiliate of the NBC Red Network in January 1927. It moved to 560 kHz on June 15, 1927, but in November returned to 650; a year later, WCAE moved to 1220 kHz

WCAE was acquired by Hearst Corporation in 1931. The North American Regional Broadcasting Agreement moved the station to 1250 kHz on March 29, 1941; on November 1, it became a full-time affiliate of the Mutual Broadcasting System (which previously aired on both WCAE and KQV), with NBC Red moving to KDKA. Another affiliation change took place on June 15, 1945, when WCAE swapped affiliations with KQV and joined the Blue Network, which changed its name to the American Broadcasting Company (ABC) that same day. An FM sister station on 96.1 MHz was started in 1948; WCAE-FM was shut down in 1953, but was restarted August 8, 1960. WCAE lost the ABC affiliation to WJAS on May 21, 1955. The station expanded into television three years later, with the debut of WTAE (channel 4) on September 4, 1958, initially as a joint venture of Hearst and the former owners of KQV; this arrangement had led to the sale of KQV to ABC in 1957 to avoid duopoly concerns.

WCAE began stunting on May 27, 1961, promoting a new format to begin two days later; at that time, the station changed its call letters to WRYT and began playing beautiful music. Another call letter change occurred five years later, when the station became WTAE to match its television sister station (which had become wholly owned by Hearst by this time); soon afterward, the station shifted to a middle-of-the-road format.

WTAE shifted its format again in 1973, this time to an oldies-heavy adult contemporary format under general manager Ted Atkins, who used programming techniques he had learned from Bill Drake at KHJ in Los Angeles. The widely popular morning show, O'Brien & Garry, featured Larry O'Brien and John Garry doing comedy skits, playing music, and other general morning fare. The format proved successful – by 1980, WTAE had become the number-two station in Pittsburgh, trailing only KDKA. The station also had a heavy sports commitment; it became the flagship station of the Pittsburgh Steelers in 1969, and around the same time became the home of the Pittsburgh Panthers. WTAE also aired a nightly sports show, hosted for many years by Myron Cope. The station also added an affiliation with ABC's Entertainment Network by 1976. In 1987, as at many AM radio stations, music was abandoned, and WTAE became a talk radio station. Hosts included Jack Bogut, Lynn Cullen, Doug Hoerth and Phil Musick.

WEAE's final logo as "1250 ESPN", used from 2008 until December 31, 2010

After 66 years of ownership, Hearst sold WTAE, along with what had become WVTY (now WKST-FM), to SFX Broadcasting in 1997. That December 1, SFX relaunched WTAE as a sports radio station. Chancellor Media bought SFX's Pittsburgh stations a year later, and then traded WTAE to Jacor in exchange for WKNR in Cleveland, Ohio in August 1998. Jacor changed the call letters to WEAE to disassociate the station from WTAE-TV, which remained owned by Hearst-Argyle. Soon afterward, Jacor put the station up for sale, and in 1999, WEAE was acquired by ABC, which affiliated the station with its ESPN Radio network on March 15 of that year. ESPN programming such as Mike and Mike in the Morning was supplemented by local sports talkers Scott Paulsen, Mike Logan, Chris Mack, Guy Junker, Stan Savran, and Stillers 365 (with Ken Laird). Mark Madden was a host on the station from 1998 until his firing in May 2008 for making an on-air remark that he wished that Sen. Edward Kennedy be assassinated. Madden returned to the Pittsburgh airwaves on October 13, 2008, with an afternoon drive show on competitor WXDX, which is otherwise a modern rock station.

WDDZ's logo as "Radio Disney AM 1250", used from 2011 until 2015

Soon after the sale to ABC, WEAE lost the Steelers rights to WDVE (itself formerly owned by ABC) and WWSW (now WBGG) after nearly thirty years; a year earlier, WTAE had lost the Pittsburgh Panthers to KQV. The station subsequently picked up the Penn State Nittany Lions.

Although WEAE was generally the top-rated sports station in Pittsburgh, ahead of WBGG, it was a financial failure (at one point losing as much as $2 million)—a problem that only worsened when KDKA-FM was launched as an FM sports station and wooed away some of WEAE's advertisers. After attempts to sell the station ended without a buyer, ABC decided to not renew its lease of WWCS, which it had run as Pittsburgh's Radio Disney affiliate, upon its expiration on December 31, 2010, and move Radio Disney to WEAE, with WBGG assuming the ESPN Radio affiliation and Penn State men's basketball moving to KQV. Local programming was largely canceled on September 25, 2010. When the format change occurred on January 1, 2011, the call letters were changed to WDDZ (which were transferred from a former Radio Disney affiliate in Providence, Rhode Island and Zion, Illinois).

On August 13, 2014, Disney put WDDZ and twenty-two other Radio Disney stations up for sale, to focus on digital distribution of the Radio Disney network. Disney originally planned to temporarily shut down the station on September 26, 2014. However, Disney changed its plans at the last minute, and all stations remained on the air and continued carrying Radio Disney programming until they were sold.

Original logo after taking "The Answer" branding

On February 25, 2015, Sports Radio Group (the Disney subsidiary that held the station's license) filed to sell WDDZ to the Pennsylvania Media Associates, Inc., a subsidiary of the Salem Media Group. Salem bought the station for $1 million. Following the sale's completion, Salem introduced its "Answer" conservative talk format on the station on May 13. The FCC granted the sale on April 13, 2015. The sale was consummated on May 12, 2015, and the call sign was changed to WPGP.

== See also ==
- WTAE-TV
- List of initial AM-band station grants in the United States
