= Frank Cox (judge) =

American judge (1862–1940)

Frank Cox (June 18, 1862 – September 18, 1940) was a justice of the Supreme Court of Appeals of West Virginia from January 1, 1905 until his retirement January 28, 1907.

Born on a farm in Grant district, Monongalia County, Virginia, Cox was the only child of Henry L. Cox and Elizabeth Matilda (Boydston) Cox. Cox attended the local schools and received a law degree from West Virginia University in June 1883. He established a solo practice in Morgantown, West Virginia, until 1888, when he entered into a partnership with George C. Baker, and was also elected as a prosecuting attorney.

In 1904, Cox was elected as a Republican to a twelve-year term as a justice of the West Virginia Supreme Court of Appeals to succeed retiring Justice Marmaduke H. Dent. Cox assumed office in 1905, and in January 1907 was chosen as President of the Court, but he resigned from the court on January 28, and returned to Morgantown to resume his private law practice with Baker.

Cox also served as judge advocate general with the rank of brigadier under Gov. Atkinson, and was a member and Vice President of the Board of Trade of Morgantown in the 1900s, and sat on the World's Fair Commission for West Virginia in 1904. In 1915, Cox was investigated by a committee of the state legislature for allegedly trying to influence legislation relating to a land tax, though nothing appeared to have come of it, with critics deeming the investigation an overreach. Cox was "active and influential both publicly and personally" during World War I, chairing a Liberty Loan drive in Monongalia County.

Cox died in Monongalia County at the age of 78.

Political offices
Preceded by Marmaduke H. Dent	Justice of the Supreme Court of Appeals of West Virginia; 1905–1907	Succeeded by William N. Miller
