= Billy the Artist =

American artist (1964–2022)

Billy the Artist (BTA) (December 15, 1964 – January 22, 2022), born William Theodore Johann Miller, was an American artist and writer based in the East Village, Manhattan, whose rise to prominence came when he created the ceiling murals for RENT. He was the artist behind Moo York Celebration, one of the cows behind the Cow Parade public art project, and subsequently created cows for other cities' projects. The East Village was a longtime canvas of his.

== Early life ==
William Theodore Johann Miller was born in Chicago, Illinois on December 15, 1964. His father was William F. Miller, an accomplished journalist and photographer who won awards while working at the Cleveland Plain Dealer. His mother was Marianne Miller, a social worker.

Miller spent his formative years in Cleveland. He enrolled in the esteemed College Conservatory of Music at the University of Cincinnati, where he obtained a Bachelor of Arts degree in 1987.

== Career ==
Miller, who had always wanted to be a Broadway actor since childhood, was drawn to the street art scene of New York City in the 1980s. Encouraged by his artist neighbor Lynn Marrapodi, he began to create his own art, and eventually gave up acting. He became known as "Billy the Artist" and gained popularity in the East Village, where his work was displayed at the Bull McCabe's saloon.

After graduating from the University of Cincinnati's College Conservatory of Music in 1987, he worked as a performer in Chicago for two years. He moved to New York City, where he landed a part in his first Broadway audition for the play Down to Earth, which never premiered due to financial issues. He performed in other productions, such as the 20th anniversary Broadway tour of Jesus Christ Superstar, an off-Broadway production of Man of La Mancha, and received praise for major roles in productions at Cincinnati Playhouse and Birmingham Theater.

In 1995, Miller realized that his true passion was art, and decided to focus on painting for the rest of his life. He participated in several group shows, including one in SoHo that featured notable artists such as KAWS, Ron English, and Anthony Freda, and another with Ryan McGinley and CRASH.

One of Miller's first artist gigs was for the Broadway musical RENT, painting murals and designing the show's original t-shirts. With the success of RENT, his art began to gain recognition from global brands and clients such as Swatch, Viacom, Lamborghini, New Balance, and many others. He collaborated with Goebel, a European company, to create a line of new Billy the Artist products that were showcased at the Maison et Objet trade show in Paris before the COVID-19 lockdowns.

Miller's paintings have been displayed in prestigious galleries such as the Forbes Gallery in New York, as well as galleries in other cities such as Chicago, Miami, Orlando, New Orleans, Austin, Cleveland, Mexico City, Hamburg, Paris, Curacao, and Zurich. His artistic works have been featured in various publications worldwide, including Rolling Stone, Vanity Fair, Vogue, Elle, US Weekly, Juxtapoz, Entertainment Weekly, and The New York Times. Miller made appearances on several television programs on major networks such as MTV, NBC, ABC, CBS, CNN, FOX, and TLC. He was featured on 60 Minutes and other programs around the world.

Miller was one of the first American artists to be allowed to paint on The Bund in Shanghai.

== Death ==
Miller died of complications from colon cancer on January 22, 2022, at the age of 57.

In March 2022, the Fine Arts Association in Willoughby, Ohio honored Miller with its Ten Below: One Act Festival.

== Bibliography ==
- 2020 - Things You Don't Hear Twice: Quotes from the East Village, NYC
- 2022 - East Village Closed
