= William Miller (golfer) =

Scottish golfer

Personal information
- Nationality: Scotland
- Born: c. 1839 Scotland

Career
- Sport: Golf
- Status: Amateur

Best results in major championships
- Masters Tournament: DNP
- PGA Championship: DNP
- U.S. Open: DNP
- The Open Championship: T9: 1865

William Miller (born c. 1839) was a Scottish amateur golfer. Miller tied for ninth place in the 1865 Open Championship.

== Early life ==
Miller was born in Scotland, circa 1839.

== Golf career ==
=== 1865 Open Championship ===
The 1865 Open Championship was the sixth Open Championship and was held on 14 September at Prestwick Golf Club. Andrew Strath won the championship by two shots from Willie Park, Sr. There were 12 competitors.

Strath had the lead after the first round on 55, a one stroke ahead of Willie Dow and Park, and two ahead of Old Tom Morris. Making his debut, Young Tom Morris scored 60. After two rounds, Park was in the lead with a total of 108 after a round of 52 with Strath was a shot behind on 109. Both Dow and Morris dropped out of contention after poor rounds. In the final round, Park scored 56 while Strath took 53 to give him a two-stroke victory.

== Death ==
Miller's place and date of death are unknown.
