= Frederick Miller (cricketer) =

English cricketer (1828–1875)

Frederick Peel Miller (born 29 July 1828 at Clapham, London; died 22 November 1875 at Chilworthy House, Ilminster, Somerset) was an English cricketer who was sometimes known by his initials as F. P. Miller. He played in matches from 1851 to 1868, primarily for Surrey, for whom he appeared from 1851 to 1867, captaining them from 1851 to 1857. He was a very successful captain, Surrey being acclaimed as the Champion County in 1851, 1854, 1856 and 1857. In 1857 the county won all nine of its matches. During the remainder of Miller's career Surrey was recognised as the leading county in 1858, 1859 and 1864.

His brother, William Miller, also played.

== As player ==
He was a right-handed batsman who, in 137 matches, made 3117 runs at an average of 14.59 – respectable enough for the period, when pitches were very poor by modern standards. (For comparison, George Parr averaged 20.20.) He made two centuries, with a highest score of 133. He was also a useful bowler, with 256 wickets at 20.58, with best innings figures of 6/36.

He appeared for the Gentlemen in their prestigious fixture against the Players on twelve occasions between 1855 and 1863.

== As captain ==
The writer David Lemmon is very complimentary about Miller's captaincy, bracketing him with John Shuter, Percy Fender and Stuart Surridge. He imposed a firm discipline on his team, but "never asked anyone to do what he would not do himself". He was a fine tactician; Jem Grundy of Nottinghamshire said that his captaincy was worth fifty runs in the field, a very large number in view of the low scores of the period.
