= William J. Miller (disambiguation) =

William J. Miller (1899–1950) was an American politician from Connecticut.

William J. Miller may also refer to:

- William John Miller or Billy Miller (1979–2023), American actor
- William Joseph Miller (actor) or Ranger Bill Miller (1878–1939), American actor
- William Joseph Miller (American football) or Bill Miller (1940–2024), American football player

== See also ==
- William Miller (disambiguation)
- William J. Mills (1849–1915), American judge and Governor of New Mexico Territory from 1910 to 1912
