= Marmaduke H. Dent =

American judge

Justice of the West Virginia Supreme Court of Appeals
- In office Jan. 1, 1871 – June 1, 1881
- Preceded by: James F. Brown
- Succeeded by: Frank Cox

Personal details
- Born: April 18, 1849 Granville, Virginia
- Died: September 11, 1909 (aged 60) Grafton, Taylor County, West Virginia
- Party: Democratic
- Relatives: Marshall Dent
- Education: West Virginia University
- Profession: Politician, lawyer, judge

Marmaduke Herbert Dent (April 18, 1849 – September 11, 1909) was a West Virginia soldier, lawyer, politician and judge of the West Virginia Supreme Court of Appeals (1893-1904).

== Early and family life ==
Born in Granville, Monongalia County, Virginia in 1848 to the former Mary C. ("Carrie") Roberts and her husband Marshall M. Dent, who was a newspaper editor in Morgantown, the county seat of Monongalia County. His grandfather, Dr. D.W. Roberts, was an early Republican, including a delegate to the 1860 Republican National Convention which nominated Abraham Lincoln for President in 1860, but Marmaduke Dent would be a lifelong Democrat and Populist. He married Mary J. Warder in 1876 and they had a daughter. The family also included elder and younger brothers and a daughter.

Marshall Dent was a delegate to the Virginia Secession Convention of 1861, where he voted against secession twice, and then became one of Monongalia County's delegates at the First Wheeling Convention and prepared the minutes.

Despite his young age, Marmaduke Dent volunteered for the 6th West Virginia Cavalry during the American Civil War. After the war, he enrolled in the first class of the new West Virginia University, and in 1870 became the first graduate (B.A.) and first advanced graduate (M.A. 1873). Dent also became the first president of its alumni association (from 1873 to 1876).

== Career ==
Dent worked as a teacher after graduation, as well as read law and was admitted to the bar in 1875, in Grafton, West Virginia, where he lived the rest of his life. After serving in a number of local elected positions in Grafton, Dent was elected to the West Virginia Supreme Court of Appeals in 1892 and served as its president in 1899, 1900, and 1902. His term lasted from 1893 to 1904, when he was not re-elected. In 1898, he wrote the opinion in Carrie Williams v. Board of Education which ruled that black students were entitled to the same length of school term as white students and that teacher Williams was entitled to the same pay.

== Death and legacy ==
Dent died of Bright's disease in Grafton in 1909, survived by his widow. Marmaduke Dent was buried at Bluemont Cemetery in Grafton. Although their daughter Virginia Dent had died in 1904, their son Herbert Warder Dent (1880-) followed his father's career path into the law and became a circuit judge. Their granddaughter Virginia Dent Reay Kurtz (1904-1987) would also serve in the West Virginia House of Delegates, representing Lewis County.

== Bibliography ==
- An American Judge: Marmaduke Dent of West Virginia, John Phillip Reid, New York University Press, 1968. ISBN 0814703593; ISBN 9780814703595
- Reviewed in Surrency, Erwin C. (October 1969). "An American Judge. Marmaduke Dent of West Virginia". The American Journal of Legal History. 13 (4): 395. doi:10.2307/844187. ISSN 0002-9319. JSTOR 844187.
