= John Douglas Miller =

British printmaker

John Douglas Miller (1860–1903) was a British printmaker. Most of his works are mezzotint translations of paintings by artists such as Joshua Reynolds, Luke Fildes, Frank Dicksee, George Richmond, William Blake Richmond, and Frederic Leighton.

== Early life ==
Miller was born in Hadley, near London, in 1860. He was the second of six sons and two daughters born to John Miller and Harriet (née Edwards) Miller. His father, who was also an artist, was a gentleman of private means. His eldest brother was Arthur William Kaye Miller, who spent 44 years at the British Museum where he became a bibliographer and was eventually appointed Keeper of Printed Books. A younger brother, William Edwards Miller, became a prominent portrait painter.

While he was a child, his family travelled abroad and lived in Italy. On his family's return to England, they settled in St Pancras, London.

== Career ==
Miller is considered a "fine mezzotinter" in a period when demand for such skills was rapidly declining due to the rise of photomechanical techniques such as photogravure.
