= William Henry Miller =

William Henry Miller may refer to:

- William Henry Miller (American politician) (1829–1870), American congressman from Pennsylvania
- William Henry Miller (architect) (1848–1922), American architect
- William Henry Miller (book collector) (1789–1848), Scottish MP for Newcastle-under-Lyme
- William Henry Miller (writer) (born 1948), American maritime historical writer
- "William Henry Miller Pt. 1", song by the Scottish indie rock band Meursault
- "William Henry Miller Pt. 2", song by the Scottish indie rock band Meursault

== See also ==
- William Miller (disambiguation)
