= Margaret Backhouse (artist) =

English painter (1818–1896)

- Born: Margaret Holden; 1818; Summerhill, United Kingdom
- Died: 18 May 1896 (aged 77–78); Kew
- Education: Sass's Academy
- Known for: Genre and portrait painting
- Spouse: Henry Fleetwood Backhouse (m. 1845)

Margaret Backhouse (née Holden) (1818–1896) was a successful British portrait and genre painter during the 19th century. Although she was born near Birmingham, Backhouse spent most of her life in London where she showed works on a regular basis at the Royal Academy, the Society of Women Artists and at the Royal Society of British Artists.

== Biography ==
Backhouse was born at Summerhill near Birmingham and grew up in Woolstaston in Shropshire. Her father was the Reverend H Augustus Holden and the family lived in Brighton for a time. Backhouse attended a school in Calais before taking art classes in Paris for a year. She studied under a painter named Grenier and a watercolour artist named Jean-Baptiste Desire Troivaux. When the family relocated to Britain they lived in Cheltenham for a year before Backhouse continued her art education at Sass's Academy in London. Later Backhouse would take further lessons from William Mulready and from the engraver Edward Goodall. In April 1845 she married the artist Henry Fleetwood Backhouse and began to raise a family while continuing to paint. In the 1860s and 1870s she visited and painted in Switzerland and Italy, often sketching women at work. Backhouse exhibited at the Royal Academy between 1846 and 1882. Between 1848 and 1885, some 80 works by Backhouse featured in Society of Women Artists exhibitions and she also showed thirty works at the Royal Society of British Artists in the same period. Many of her paintings were issued as chromolithographs by Rowney's.

By 1850 Backhouse was living at Richmond Road in Islington and she seems to have stayed there until 1868 or 1869 and then lived at Whitley Villas on the Caledonian Road until at least 1885. Her daughter, Mary, also became an artist; she married the artist William Miller. Backhouse died on 18 May 1896 at 3 Lichfield Villas, Kew. Her husband died on 1 February 1901 at The Avenue, Kew.
