= William Millar =

William Millar may refer to:

- William Millar (transportation executive), former President of the American Public Transportation Association
- William Millar (British Army officer) (died 1838), British Royal Artillery officer
- William Millar (politician) (1839–1913), Irish-born Wisconsin politician
- Billy Millar (rugby union) (1883–1949), South African rugby union player
- Willie Millar (1901–1966), Scottish footballer (Ayr United, Middlesbrough FC, York City)
- Billy Millar (footballer, born 1906), Irish international footballer (Linfield FC, Liverpool FC, Barrow AFC)
- Billy Millar (footballer, born 1924) (1924–1995), Scottish footballer (Aberdeen FC, Swindon Town, Gillingham FC, Accrington Stanley)
- William Millar (1931–1977), Irish-born American actor, known as Stephen Boyd
- Will Millar (born 1940), Irish-Canadian singer

== See also ==
- William Miller (disambiguation)
- William Mueller (disambiguation)
