= 1865 Open Championship =

Tournament information
- Dates: 14 September 1865
- Location: Prestwick, South Ayrshire, Scotland
- Course: Prestwick Golf Club

Statistics
- Field: 12 players
- Prize fund: £20
- Winner's share: £8

Champion
- (Scotland) Andrew Strath
- 162

Location in Scotland

The 1865 Open Championship was the sixth Open Championship and was held on 14 September at Prestwick Golf Club. Andrew Strath won the championship by two shots from Willie Park, Sr. There were 12 competitors.

Strath had the lead after the first round on 55, a one stroke ahead of Willie Dow and Park, and two ahead of Old Tom Morris. Making his debut, Young Tom Morris scored 60. After two rounds, Park was in the lead with a total of 108 after a round of 52 with Strath a shot behind on 109. Both Dow and Morris dropped out of contention after poor rounds. In the final round, Park scored 56 while Strath took 53 to give him a two stroke victory.

== Final leaderboard ==
Thursday, 14 September 1865

Place	Player	Score	Money
1	(Scotland) Andrew Strath	55-54-53=162	£8
2	(Scotland) Willie Park, Sr.	56-52-56=164	£6
3	(Scotland) Willie Dow	56-61-54=171	£4
4	(Scotland) Bob Kirk	64-54-54=172	£2
5	(Scotland) Tom Morris, Sr.	57-61-58=176	
6	(Scotland) William Doleman (a)	62-57-59=178	
7	(Scotland) Robert Andrew	61-59-59=179	
8	(Scotland) Willie Strath	60-60-62=182	
T9	(Scotland) John Allan	64-66-59=189	
T9	(Scotland) William Miller (a)	63-60-66=189	
