= William Mueller =

William Mueller may refer to:

- Trevor Murdoch (William Theodore Mueller), American professional wrestler
- William A. Mueller, American sound engineer
- William Boyce Mueller, founder of Forgotten Scouts
- Bill Mueller, American baseball third baseman
- Bill Mueller (outfielder), American baseball center fielder

== See also ==
- Bill Muller (1964–2007), American journalist and film critic
- William Millar (disambiguation)
- William Miller (disambiguation)
