= Billy Miller (Australian footballer) =

Australian rules footballer

Personal information
- Full name: William McMaith Hastie Miller
- Born: 9 March 1884; Melbourne, Victoria
- Died: 2 October 1970 (aged 86); Windsor, Victoria

Playing career^{1}
Years	Club	Games (Goals)
1907, 1909	Geelong	9 (1)
- ^{1} Playing statistics correct to the end of 1909.

William McMaith Hastie Miller (9 March 1884 – 2 October 1970) was an Australian rules footballer who played with Geelong in the Victorian Football League (VFL).
