= Anthony Freda =

Illustrator

- Citizenship: American
- Occupations: Artist; Illustrator; Educator
- Website: anthonyfreda.com

Anthony Freda is an American artist, illustrator and educator based in New York City.

== Career ==
Freda’s artwork is characterized by a politically engaged visual style. He frequently combines collage, found objects, drawing, and digital techniques to produce layered compositions that address social, cultural, and political issues. His work often incorporates elements of social commentary, activism, and critique of contemporary power structures.

In 2006, The Village Voice commissioned Freda to illustrate a story about individuals who challenged the official narrative of the September 11 attacks. Freda’s artwork Questions is held in the permanent collection of the National September 11 Memorial & Museum in New York City. The museum’s collection description states that the work, "This art piece, Questions resonates with the core ideologies informing the 9/11 Truth Movement and provides a thought-provoking example of that particular dissenting voice, which emerged as part of 9/11’s legacy."

In 2019, Freda served as a judge for the Unleashed! Members Open exhibition at the Society of Illustrators. His work has appeared in Playboy, Time, Rolling Stone, The New York Times, and The New Yorker.

Freda designed the book cover for The Rise of the New Normal Reich. In 2025, Freda issued a public statement regarding the prosecution of C.J. Hopkins in Germany over Hopkins’s sharing of the cover image, drawing attention to debates about art, censorship, and free expression.

He is an Adjunct professor in the Illustration and Interactive Media department at the Fashion Institute of Technology.

== Selected exhibitions ==
=== Solo ===
- 2018: Impotent Gods, Revolution Gallery, Buffalo, NY
- 2014: The Devil’s Carnival, Bunnycutlet Gallery, Brooklyn, NY
- 2014: Blackboard Jungle, Trifecta Gallery, Las Vegas, NV
- 2013: Order Out of Chaos, A.J. Dillon Gallery, Atlantic Highlands, NJ
- 2011: Keep on the Sunnyside, Trifecta Gallery, Las Vegas, NV
- 2009: The Meek Shall Inherit Nothing, Marshal Arisman Gallery, Jim Thorpe, PA

=== Group ===
- 2018: American Monsters, Star Gallery, L.E.S., NYC
- 2016: IH8War, Terranuova, Italy
- 2003: Imodium Man, CowParade, NYC
