= William Miller (cricketer, born 1817) =

English cricketer

Personal information
- Full name: William Henry Miller
- Born: Unknown; christened 24 December 1817; Clapham, Surrey, England
- Died: Unknown
- Batting: Unknown
- Relatives: Frederick Miller (brother)

Career statistics
Competition	First-class
Matches	6
Runs scored	87
Batting average	9.66
100s/50s	–/–
Top score	31
Balls bowled	–
Wickets	–
Bowling average	–
5 wickets in innings	–
10 wickets in match	–
Best bowling	–
Catches/stumpings	1/–
- Source: Cricinfo, 2 October 2018

William Henry Miller (date of birth and death unknown; christened 24 December 1817) was an English first-class cricketer.

Miller made six first-class cricket appearances in first-class cricket, all for the Surrey Club. His debut came in 1851 against the Marylebone Cricket Club at Lord's, with his final appearance coming against the same opposition in 1853 at The Oval. He scored 87 runs in his six matches, with a top score of 31. His brother, Frederick, was also a first-class cricketer.
