= William N. Miller =

American judge (1855–1928)

William Niswonger Miller (October 18, 1855 – August 7, 1928) was a justice of the Supreme Court of Appeals of West Virginia from January 28, 1907 until his death on August 7, 1928. He was a Republican.

Born in Uniopolis, Ohio, Miller received a B.A. from Otterbein University in 1879. He followed up with an M.A. from the same institution in 1881.

On January 28, 1907, Governor William M. O. Dawson appointed Miller to a seat on the state supreme court vacated by the resignation of Justice Frank Cox.

Political offices
Preceded by Frank Cox	Justice of the Supreme Court of Appeals of West Virginia; 1907–1928	Succeeded by Haymond Maxwell
