= Bill Miller (footballer, born 1908) =

English footballer

Personal information
- Full name: William Miller
- Date of birth: 31 March 1908
- Place of birth: Stockport, England
- Date of death: 1974 (aged 65–66)
- Position: Centre half

Senior career*
Years	Team	Apps	(Gls)
–	Altrincham		
–	Bolton Wanderers	0	(0)
1931–1932	Luton Town	3	(0)
–	Runcorn		
–	Stockport County	0	(0)
–	Stalybridge Celtic		
1935–1936	Southport	1	(0)
–	Stalybridge Celtic		
1936–1937	Macclesfield	29	(1)
–	Lancaster City		
- * Club domestic league appearances and goals

William Miller (31 March 1908 – 1974) was an English professional footballer who made four appearances in the Football League, three for Luton Town and one for Southport. He was also on the books of Bolton Wanderers and Stockport County, without appearing in the Football League, and also played for several non-League clubs in the Cheshire and Lancashire area. He played as a centre half. Miller was born in Stockport, Cheshire, in 1908 and died in 1974, aged about 66.
