= William Miller (first baseman) =

19th-century American baseball player

- First baseman

NA debut
- June 26, 1872, for the Washington Nationals

Last NA appearance
- June 26, 1872, for the Washington Nationals

NA statistics
- At bats: 4
- Hits: 1
- RBIs: 0

Teams
- Washington Nationals (1872)

William Miller (fl. 1872) was an amateur baseball player in Washington D.C. He played in one professional Major League Baseball baseball game, for the Washington Nationals of the National Association in June 1872, as a first baseman. He collected one hit, a single, in four plate appearances. He had 12 putouts and committed one error in his ten innings in the field. The Nationals lost the game, their final game of the 1872 season (they played only eleven games, finishing in last place with an 0-11 record).

== Notes ==
1. If one allows that the National Association was a major league, a question disputed among baseball historians. See National Association of Professional Base Ball Players#Major league status question.
