= Willie Dow =

Scottish golfer

- Dow at Leith Links on 17 May 1867

Personal information
- Full name: William Dow
- Nationality: Scotland
- Born: c. 1839 Musselburgh, Scotland
- Died: Date of death unknown Scotland

Career
- Sport: Golf
- Status: Professional

Best results in major championships
- Masters Tournament: DNP
- PGA Championship: DNP
- U.S. Open: DNP
- The Open Championship: 3rd: 1861, 1865

William Dow (born c. 1839) was a Scottish professional golfer. He had six top-10 finishes in the Open Championship. Dow placed third in both the 1861 and 1865 Open Championships.

== Early life ==
Dow was born in Musselburgh, Scotland, circa 1839.

== Golf career ==
He served as professional at the Montrose Golf Club in Montrose, Angus, Scotland. In an 1889 sheriff's sale conducted by George Henry Thoms, sheriff of Orkney, a featherie golf ball made by Allan Robertson that Dow owned was subsequently donated to the Society of Antiquaries of Scotland. It is unclear whether Dow was already deceased at that time or had just forfeited property in the sale.

=== 1861 Open Championship ===
The 1861 Open Championship was a golf competition held at Prestwick Golf Club, Ayrshire, Scotland. It was the second Open Championship and the first to open to amateurs as well as professionals. Ten professionals and eight amateurs contested the event, with Old Tom Morris winning the championship by 4 shots from Willie Park, Sr. Dow finished in third place, carding rounds of 59-58-54=171.

=== 1865 Open Championship ===
The 1865 Open Championship was the sixth Open Championship and was held on 14 September at Prestwick Golf Club. Andrew Strath won the championship by two shots from Willie Park, Sr. There were 12 competitors. Dow finished in third place and posted rounds of 56-61-54=171. He won £4 in prize money.

==== Details of play ====
Strath was in the lead after the first round on 55, a one stroke ahead of Willie Dow and Park, and two shots ahead of Old Tom Morris a/k/a Tom Morris, Sr. Making his debut, Young Tom Morris, son of Old Tom Morris, scored 60. After two rounds, Park was in the lead with a total of 108 after a round of 52 with Strath being a shot behind on 109. Both Dow and Morris dropped out of contention after poor rounds. In the final round, Park scored 56 while Strath took 53 to give him a two-stroke victory.

== Death ==
Dow's date of death is unknown.

== Results in The Open Championship ==
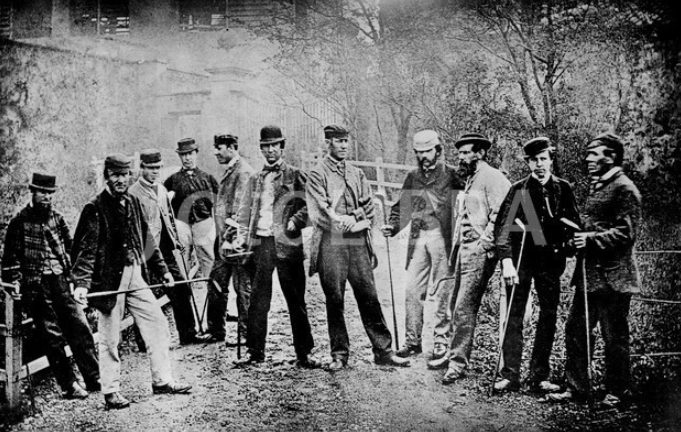
Dow (sixth from left) at Leith Links on 17 May 1867

Tournament	1861	1862	1863	1864	1865	1866	1867	1868	1869	1870
The Open Championship	3	4		5	3		T8	10		17

Note: Dow played only in The Open Championship.

Top 10
Did not play

"T" indicates a tie for a place
