= William Ian Miller =

William Ian Miller (born March 30, 1946) is the Thomas G. Long Professor of Law at the University of Michigan. He is also Honorary Professor of History at the University of St. Andrews. His area of specialty is the sagas of medieval Iceland, but he also has written extensively on revenge and on various emotions, mostly self-attentional. He grew up in Green Bay, Wisconsin, received his BA from the University of Wisconsin in 1969; a Ph.D in English and a JD in law at Yale 1975, 1980.

== Bibliography ==
- Outrageous Fortune: Gloomy Reflection on Luck and Life. Oxford University Press. 2021. ISBN 978-0197530689.
- Hrafnkel or the Ambiguities. Oxford University Press. 2017. ISBN 9780198793038
- Why is your axe bloody? : a reading of Njáls saga. Oxford University Press. 2014. ISBN 9780198704843.
- Losing It, in which an aging professor laments his shrinking brain, which he flatters himself formerly did him noble service: a plaint, tragic-comical, historical, vengeful, sometimes satirical and thankful in six parts, if his memory does yet serve. Yale University Press. 2011. ISBN 9780300171013.
- Audun and the polar bear : luck, law, and largesse in a Medieval tale of risky business. Brill Academic Publishers. 2008. ISBN 9789004168114.
- Eye for an eye. Cambridge University Press. 2006. ISBN 9780521856805.
- Faking it. Cambridge University Press. 2003. ISBN 9780521613705.
- The mystery of courage. Harvard University Press. 2000.
- The anatomy of disgust. Harvard University Press. 1997. ISBN 9780674031555.
- Humiliation : and other essays on honor, social discomfort, and violence. Cornell University Press. 1993. ISBN 9780801481178.
- Bloodtaking and peacemaking : feud, law, and society in saga Iceland. University of Chicago Press. 1990. ISBN 9780226526805.
- Law and literature in Medieval Iceland : Ljósvetninga sagaand Valla-Ljóts saga. Stanford University Press. 1989. ISBN 9780804715324.
