= William Edwards Miller =

British artist (1851–1940)

William Edwards Miller FSA
- Born: 24 April 1851; Florence, Italy
- Died: 2 March 1940 (aged 88); Marylebone, England
- Education: Royal Academy of Arts
- Occupation: Painter
- Spouse: Mary Jessie Ruth Backhouse (m. 1880; died 1928)
- Parent(s): John Miller; Harriet Edwards
- Relatives: John Douglas Miller (brother)

William Edwards Miller FSA (24 April 1851 – 2 March 1940) was a British artist known as a society portrait painter as well as an antiquarian horological collector.

== Early life ==
Miller was born in Florence on 24 April 1851. He was the third of six sons and two daughters born to John Miller and Harriet (née Edwards) Miller. His father, who was also an artist, was a gentleman of private means. One of his elder brothers was John Douglas Miller, who, like William, was a pupil of the Royal Academy schools, became a prominent mezzotint engraver and protégé of George Richmond. His eldest brother was Arthur William Kaye Miller, who spent 44 years at the British Museum where he became a bibliographer and was eventually appointed Keeper of Printed Books.

On his family's return to England, they settled in St Pancras, London. In 1869, he was awarded the silver medal for "Best Drawing from the Antique" from the Royal Academy of Arts at Burlington House.

== Career ==
Miller began exhibiting at the Royal Academy in 1873, primarily with portraits and figure subjects. He exhibited regularly until 1893, then more sporadically, all portraits, in 1895, 1900, 1903 and 1909. He exhibited at the Royal Scottish Academy in 1891, as well as the Grosvenor Gallery, the New Gallery, at Birmingham Art Gallery and at the Walker Art Gallery in Liverpool, until 1909. Afterwards, his practice ran privately until c. 1929.

In 1897, Miller was commissioned to paint a full-length portrait of the 8-year-old George St Vincent Harris (later 5th Baron Harris), who started collecting clocks as a boy. In 1910 he made a portrait of fellow collector Lewis Evans, who endowed the History of Science Museum, Oxford in 1925. Miller gave the Oxford museum three items, including a 16h-century iron clock.

In 1915, Miller lent approximately over 150 clocks and other time pieces to the Victoria and Albert Museum, which he later bequeathed to the museum. Miller was elected a Fellow of the Society of Antiquaries in 1923 for his horological interests. In 1934, he donated six clocks and ninety-five watches, dating from the 16th and 17th centuries, to the Guildhall Museum (which today are in the collection of the Museum of London).

=== Portrait gallery ===
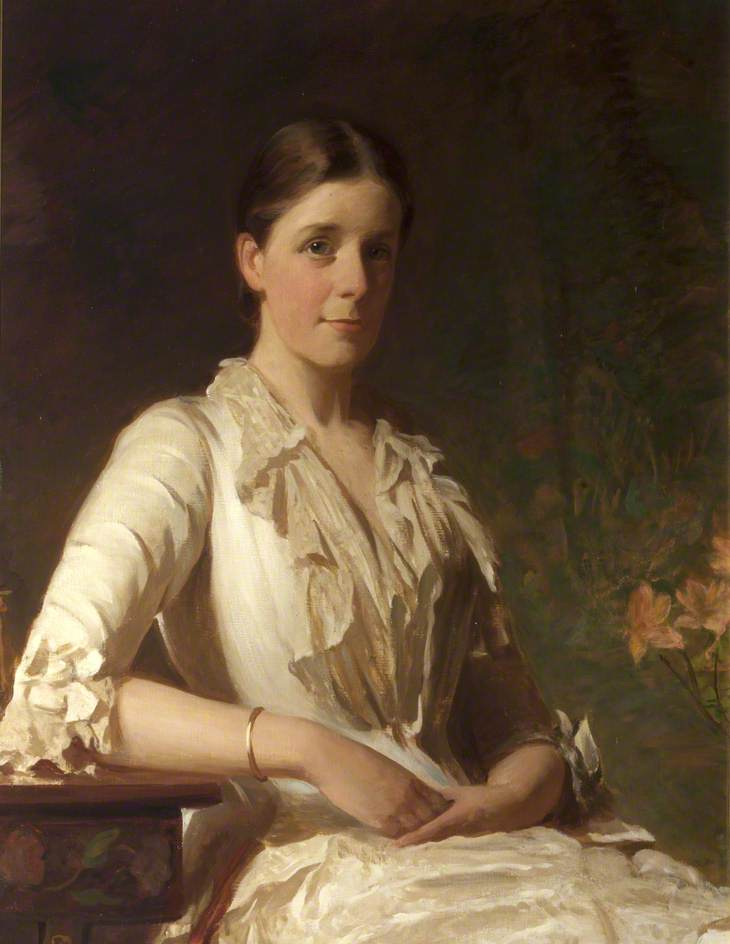
Mary Monica Maxwell-Scott, 1874

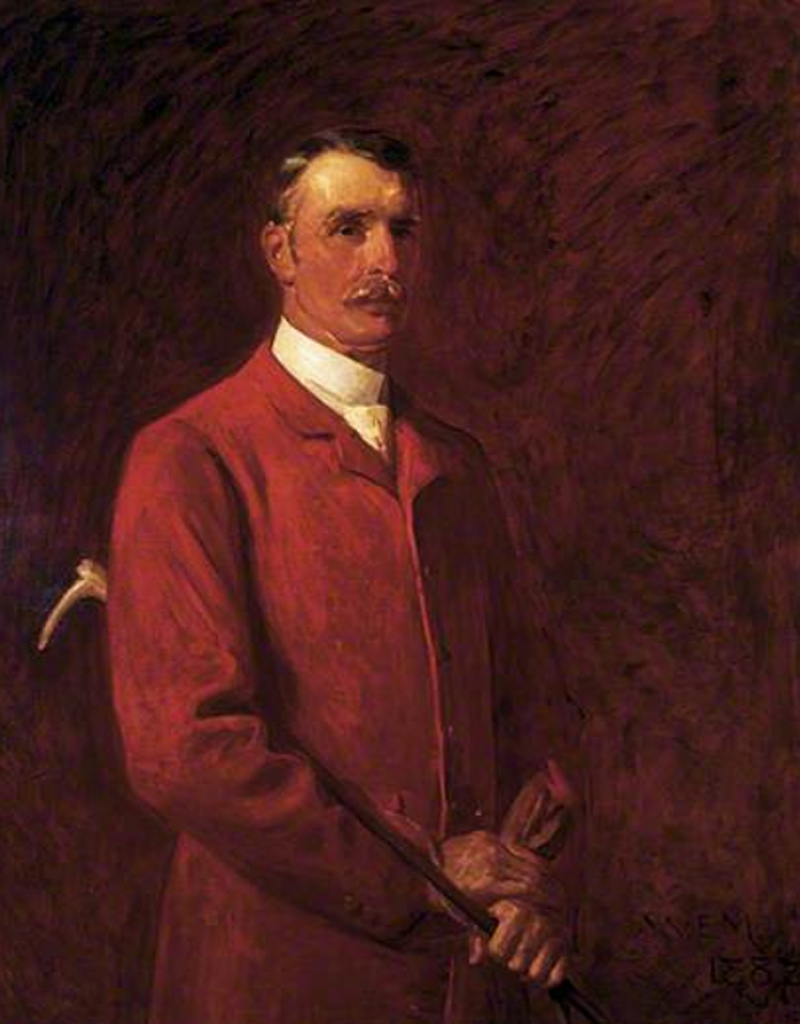
Edmund Ernest Leatham, 1887

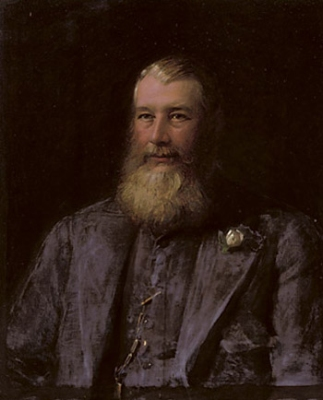
William David Murray, Viscount Stormont, c. 1893

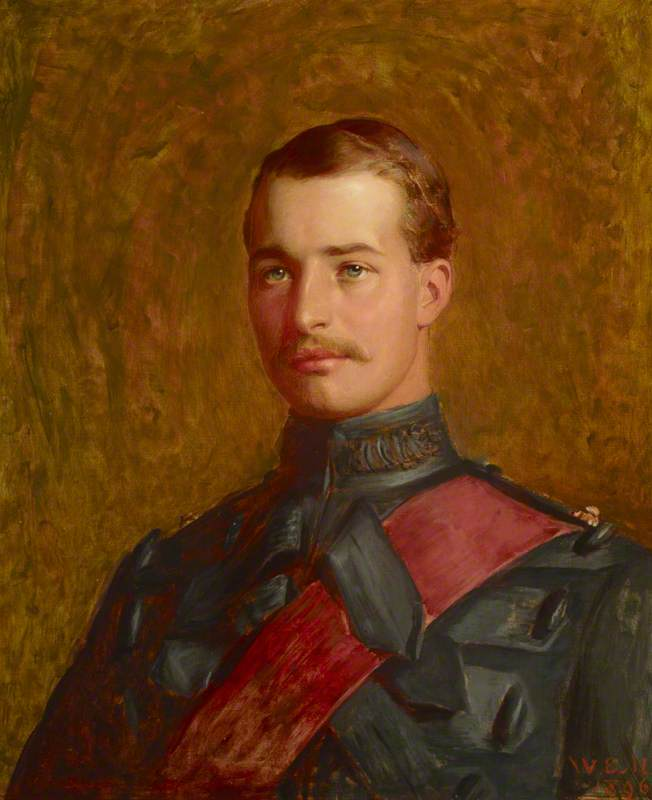
Francis Douglas, Viscount Drumlanrig, 1896

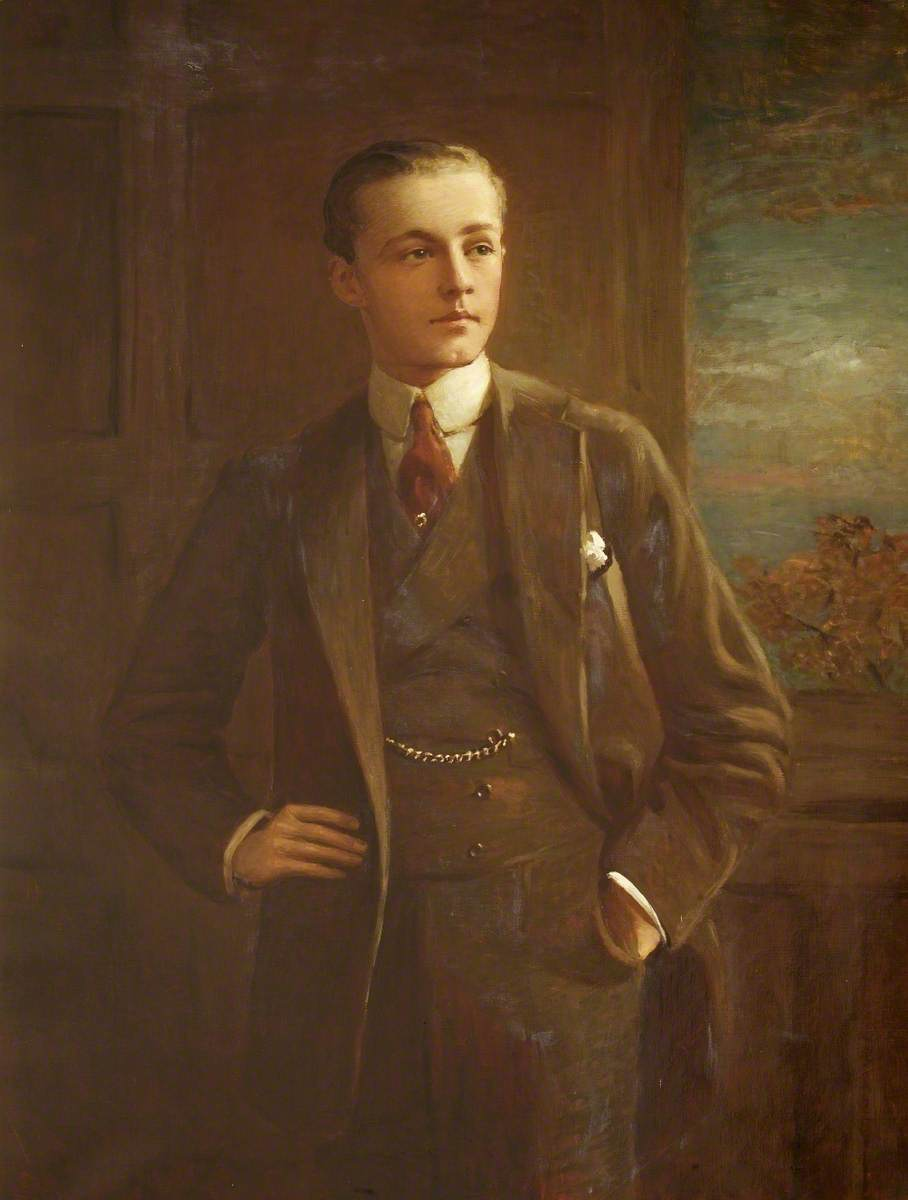
Richard Edward Lawley, between c. 1900 and c. 1910

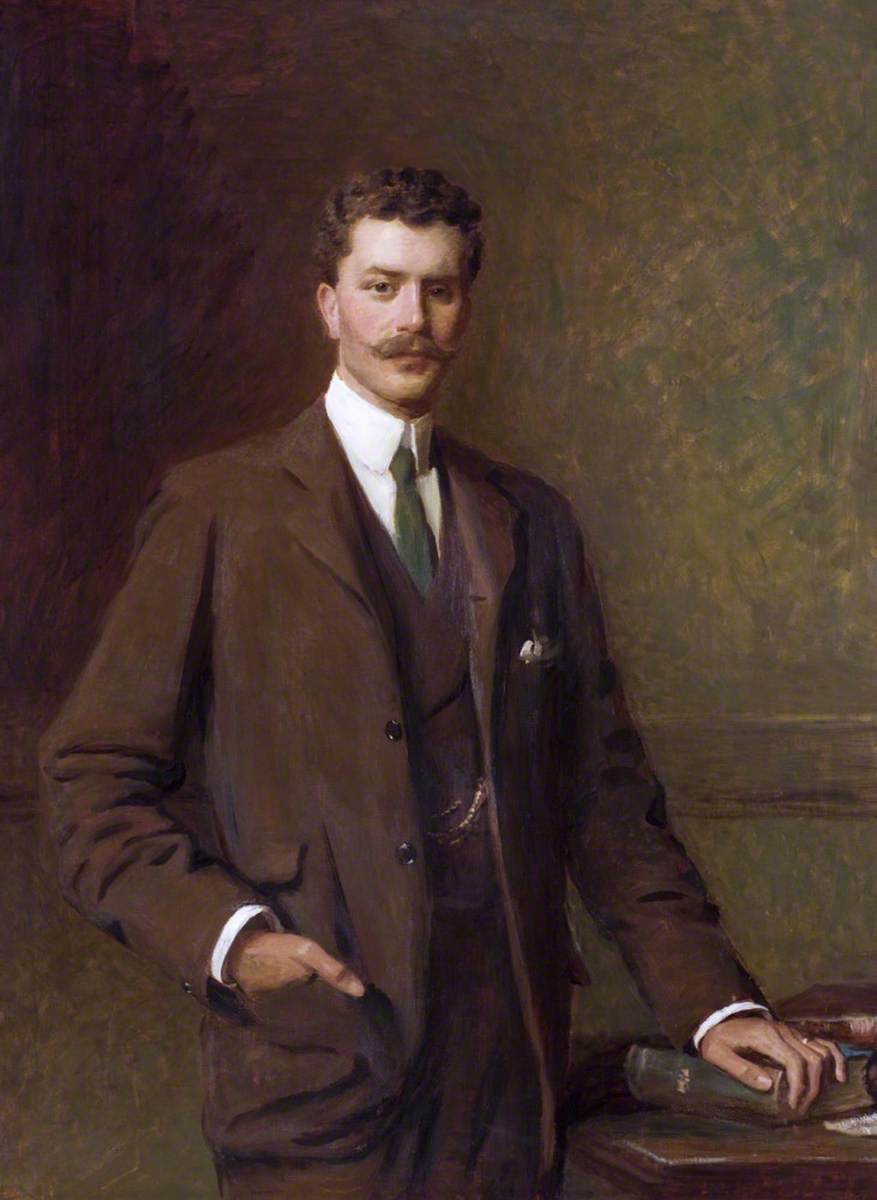
Walter Rice, 7th Baron Dynevor, between c. 1900 and c. 1912

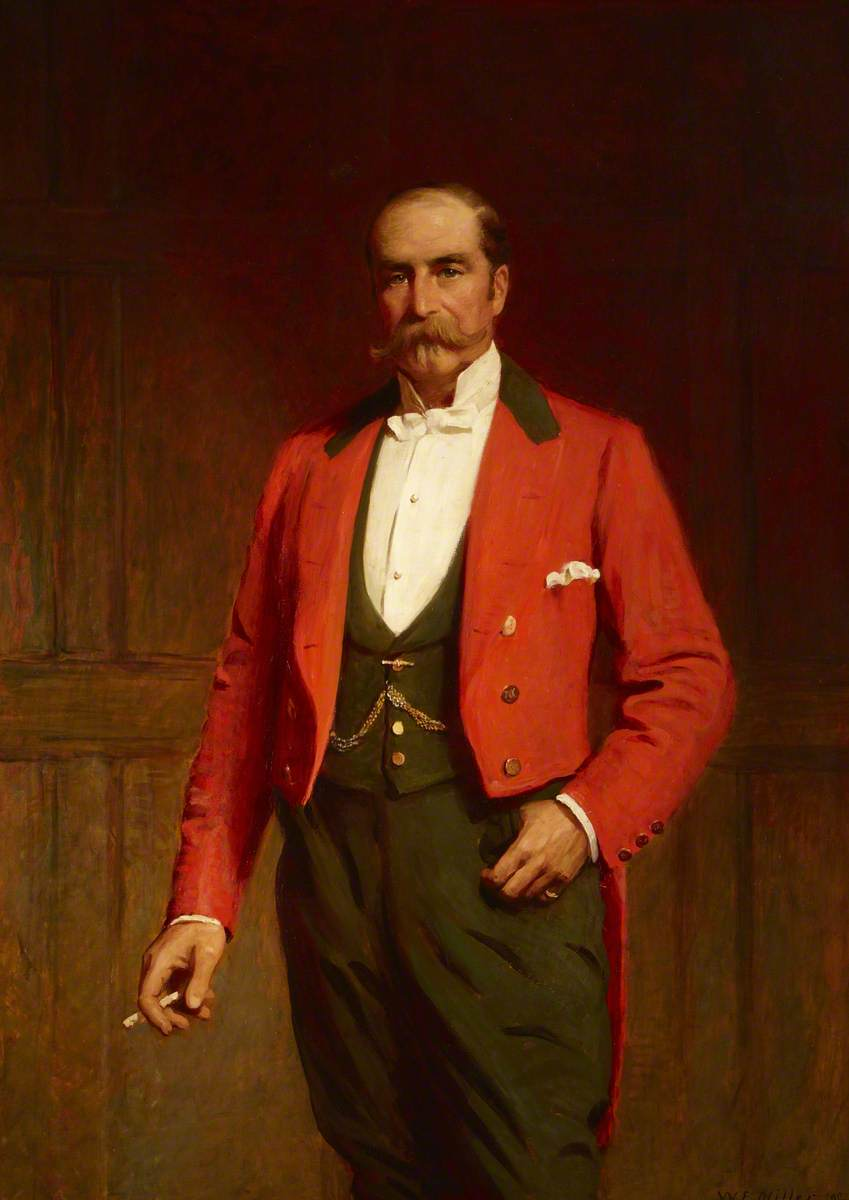
Lowry Cole, 4th Earl of Enniskillen, 1902

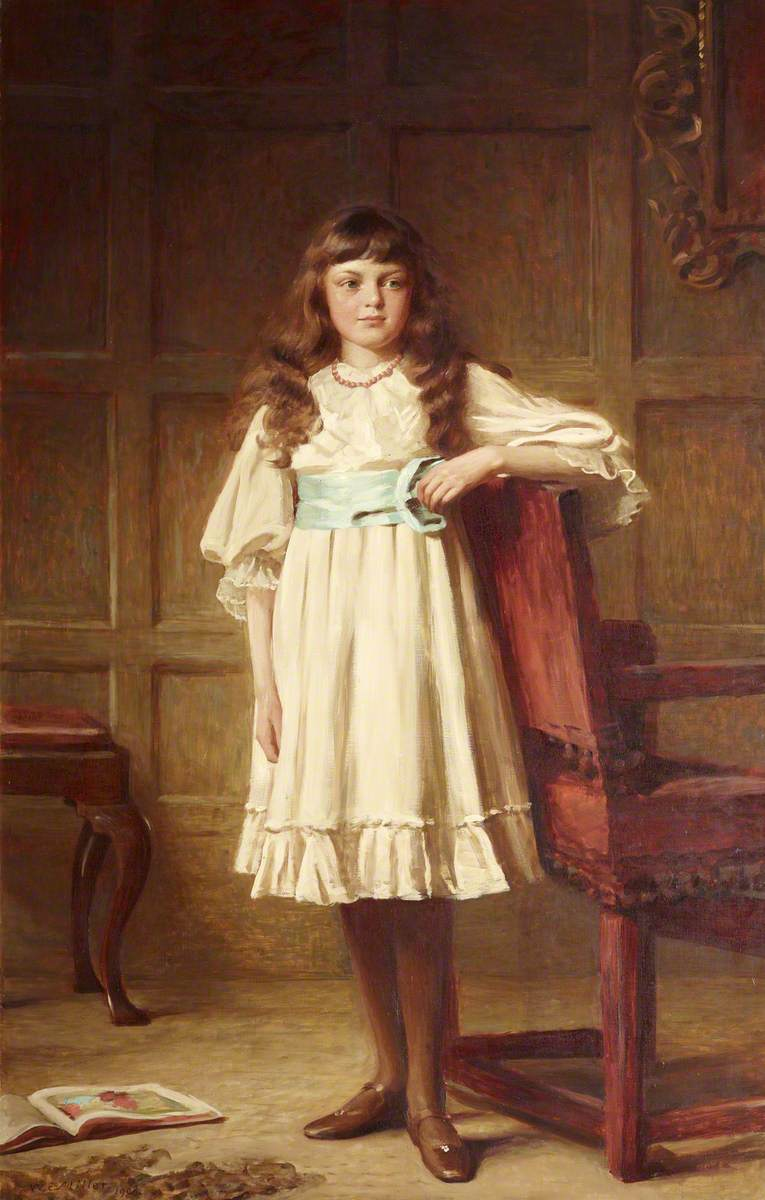
Lady Marjorie Hervey (later Lady Erskine), 1908

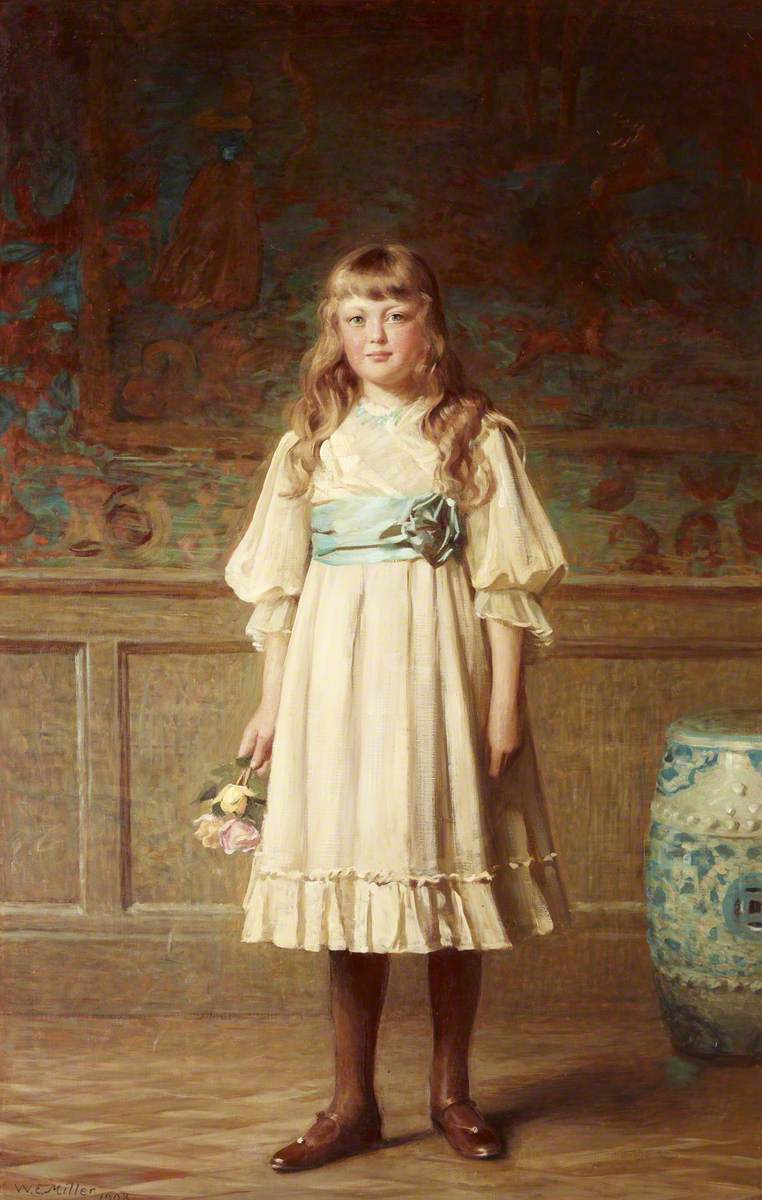
Lady Phyllis Hervey (later Lady Phyllis MacRae), 1908

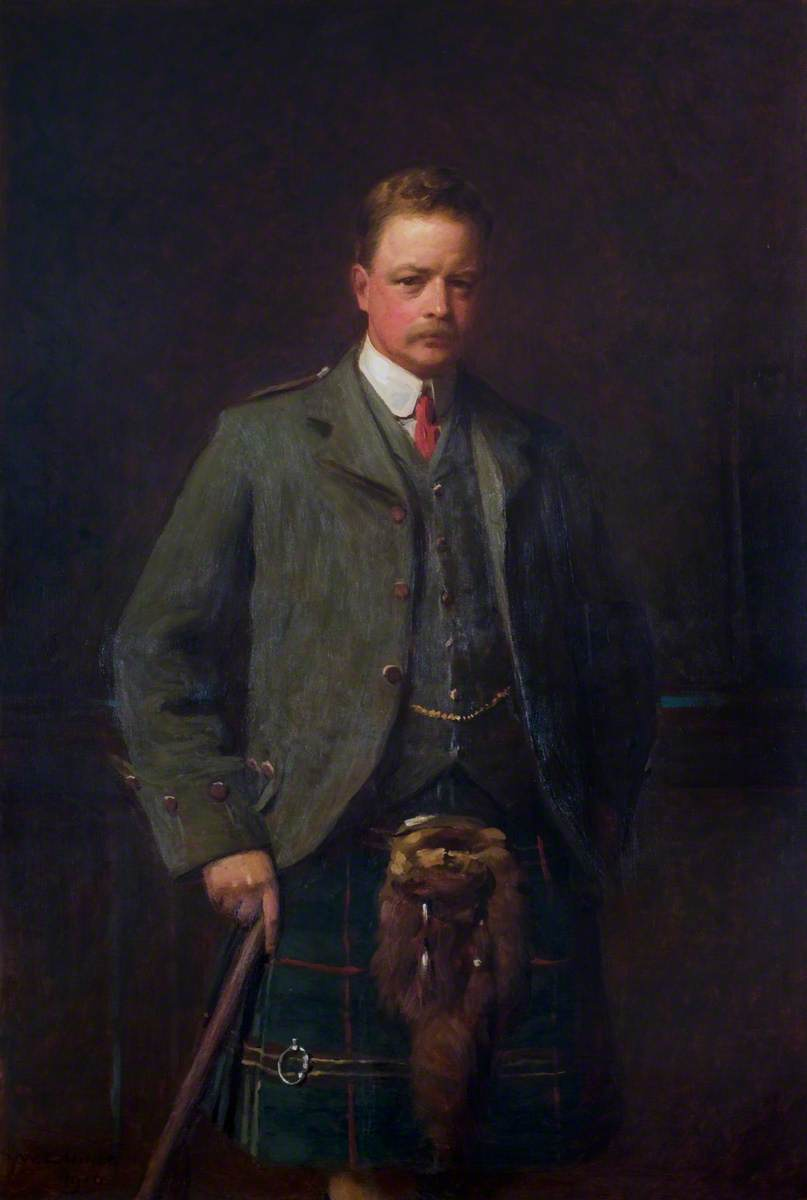
Archibald Kennedy, 4th Marquess of Ailsa, 1910

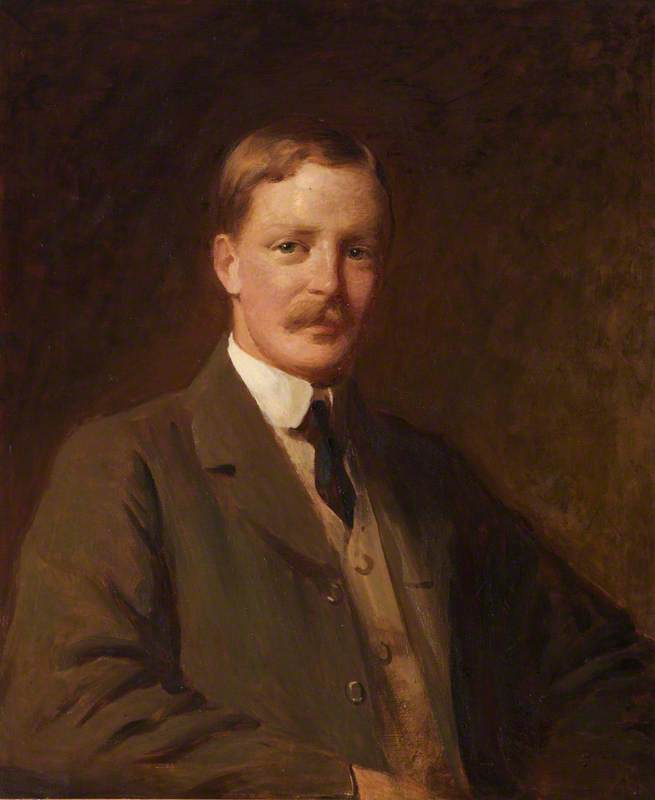
The Hon. Arthur George Child Villiers, c. 1912

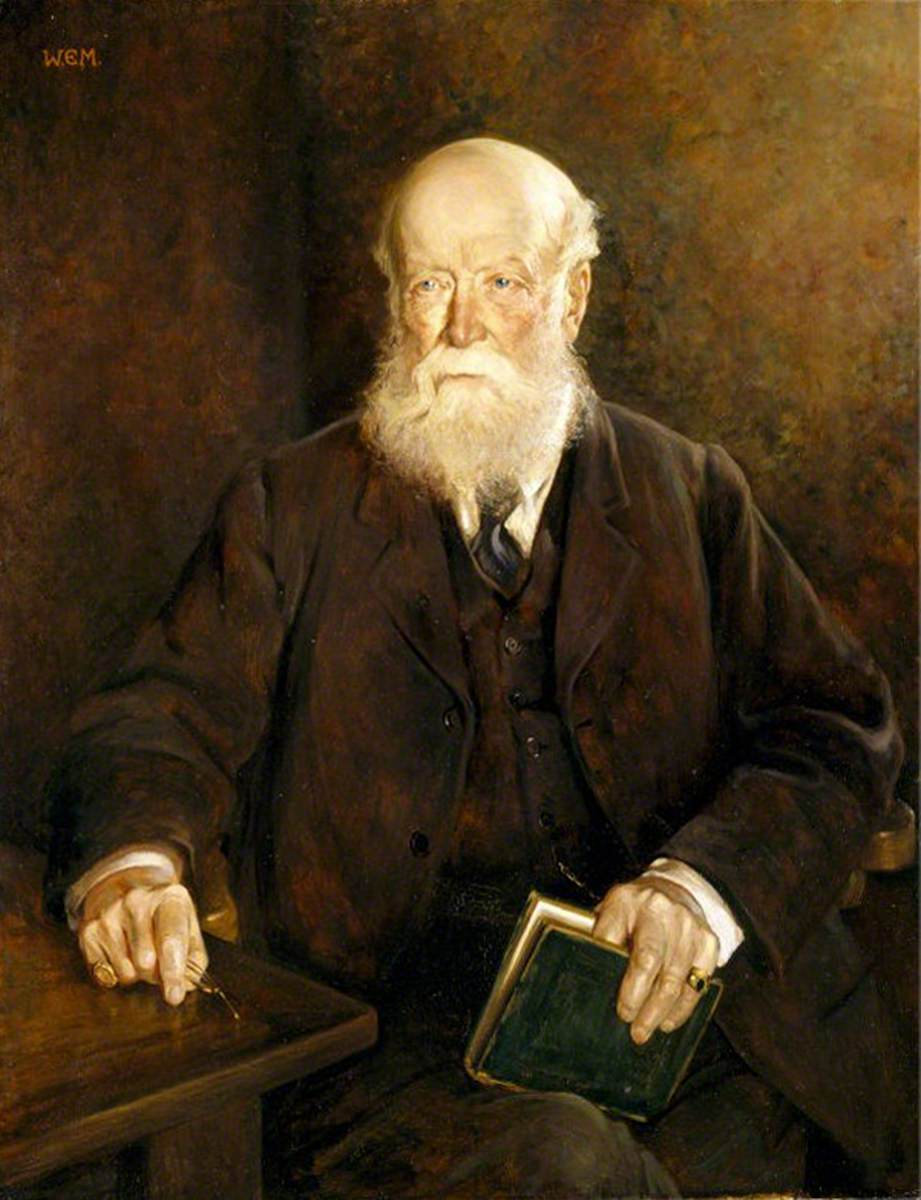
Piers Frederick Legh, 1917

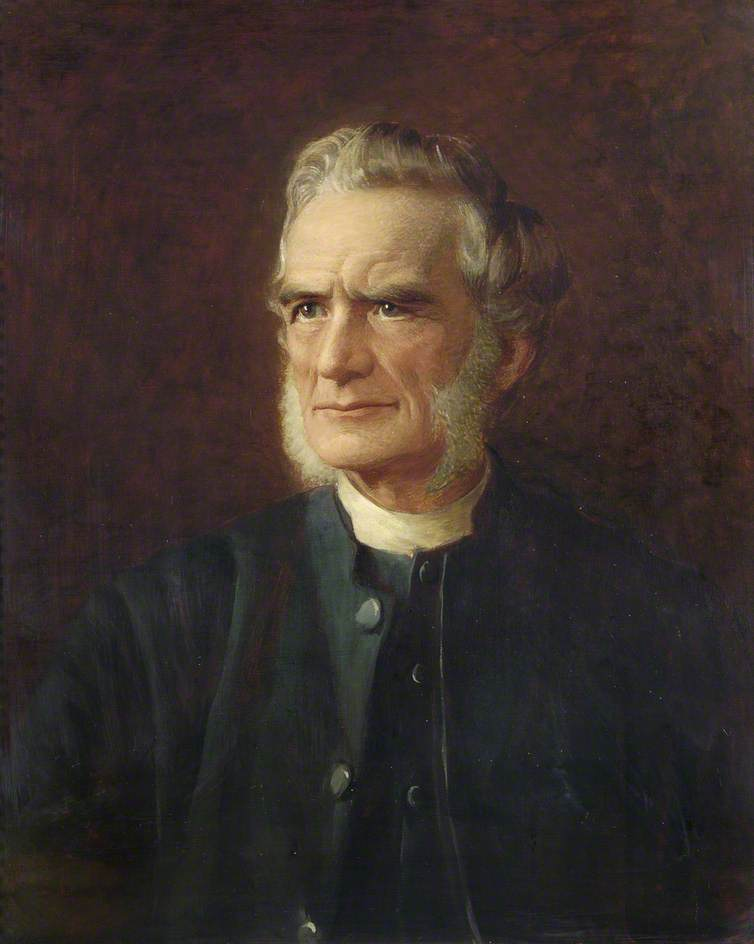
Brooke Foss Westcott, Bishop of Durham

== Personal life ==
On 20 May 1880, he married Mary Jessie Ruth Backhouse (1846–1928) at the British Vice-Consulate and at the Church of the Holy Trinity in Boulogne-sur-Mer. She was daughter of two Camden-based artists, Henry Fleetwood Backhouse and Margaret (née Holden) Backhouse, a successful British portrait and genre painter. Mary was also an artist, and exhibited at the Royal Academy in 1870–1875, 1880, 1885, 1889, 1891, and in 1893.

His wife died at 3 St Petersburgh Place, Bayswater, on 11 July 1928. They had no children. He later lived with Emma Rothwell (1876–1956), a retired schoolteacher who reportedly was Miller's his adopted daughter. Miller died at 50 Weymouth Street, in the Marylebone district in the City of Westminster on 2 March 1940. Following his death, Emma gave "several wooden sculptures of religious subjects from the Miller collection to the V&A." On her death in 1956, she left the V&A a longcase clock which Miller had left her.
