= James Locke =

James Locke may refer to:

- James William Locke, American judge and politician in Florida
- James Locke (draper), London draper

== See also ==
- James Lock (disambiguation)
