= Thomas Campbell (sculptor) =

Scottish sculptor (1790–1858)

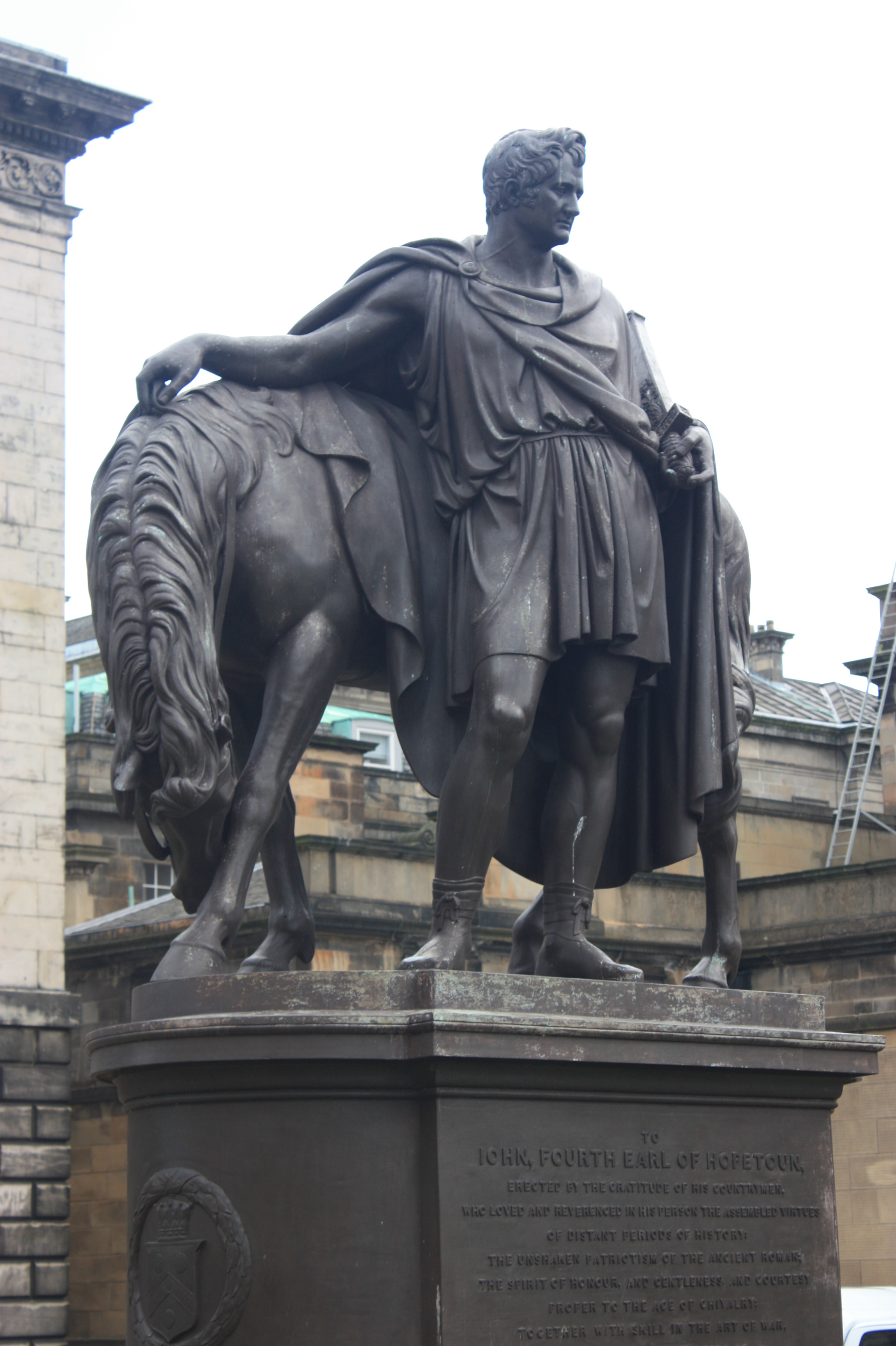
Sir John Hope statue at Dundas House

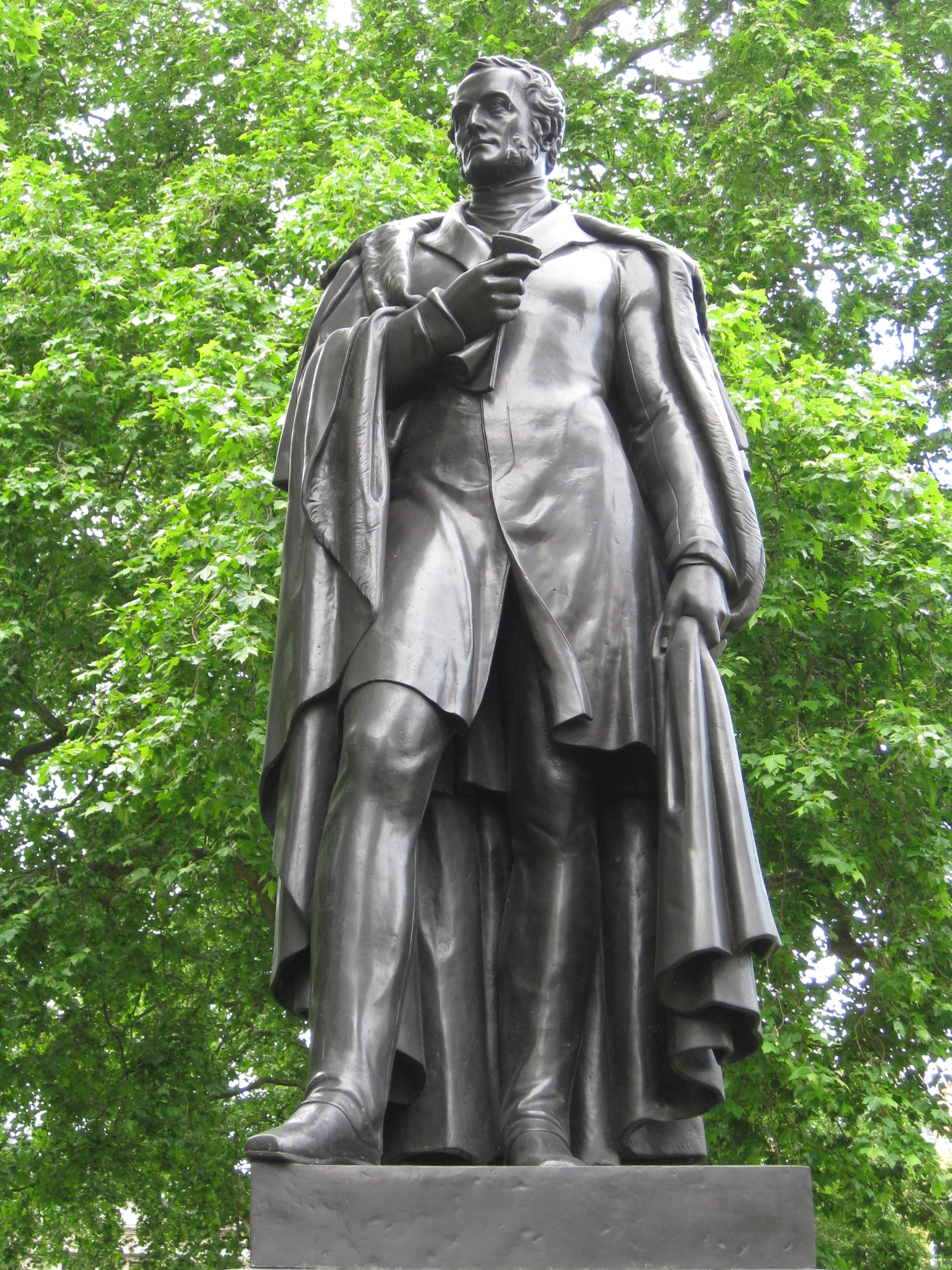
Statue in Cavendish Square, London

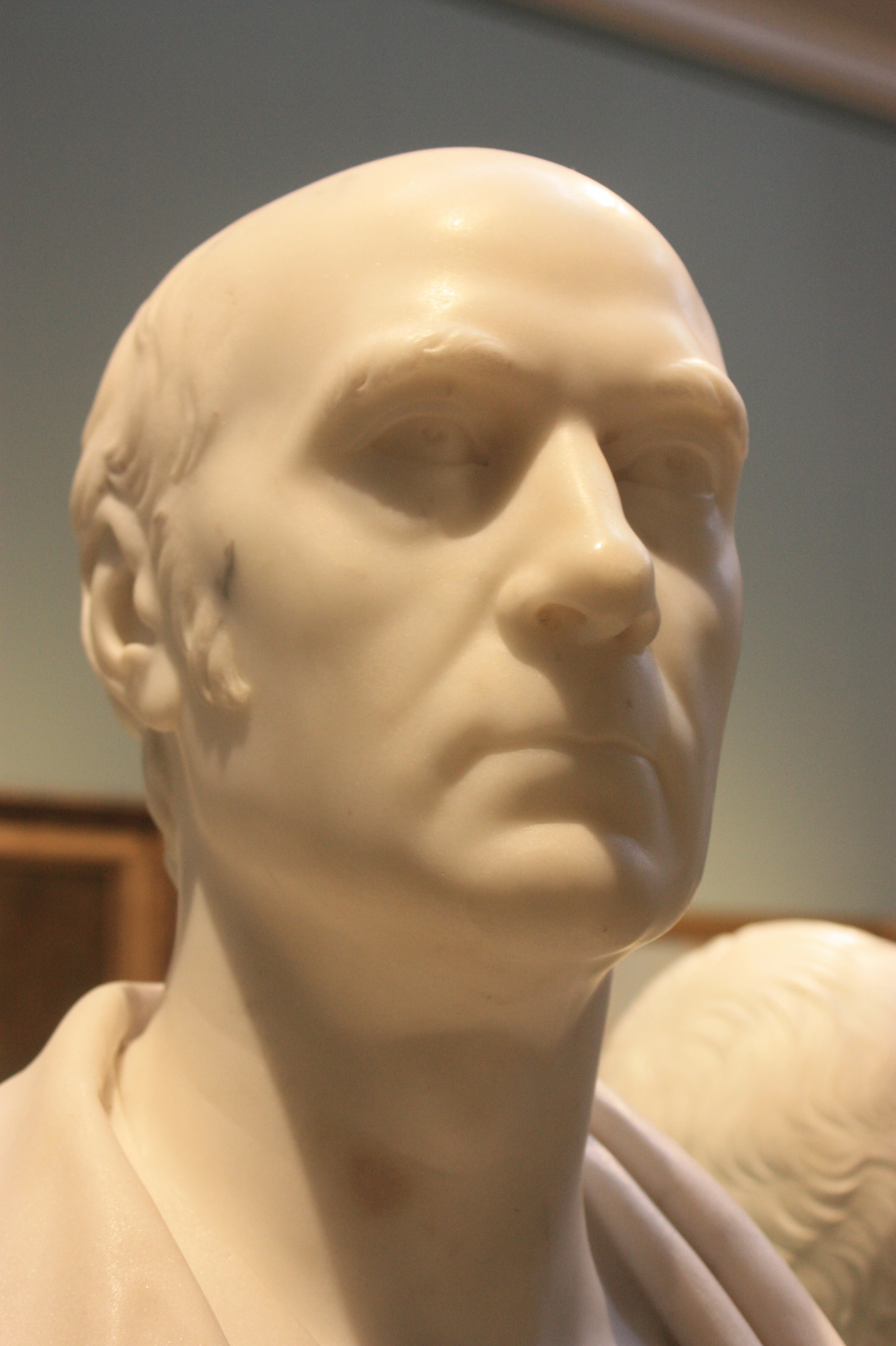
Sir Henry Raeburn by Thomas Campbell

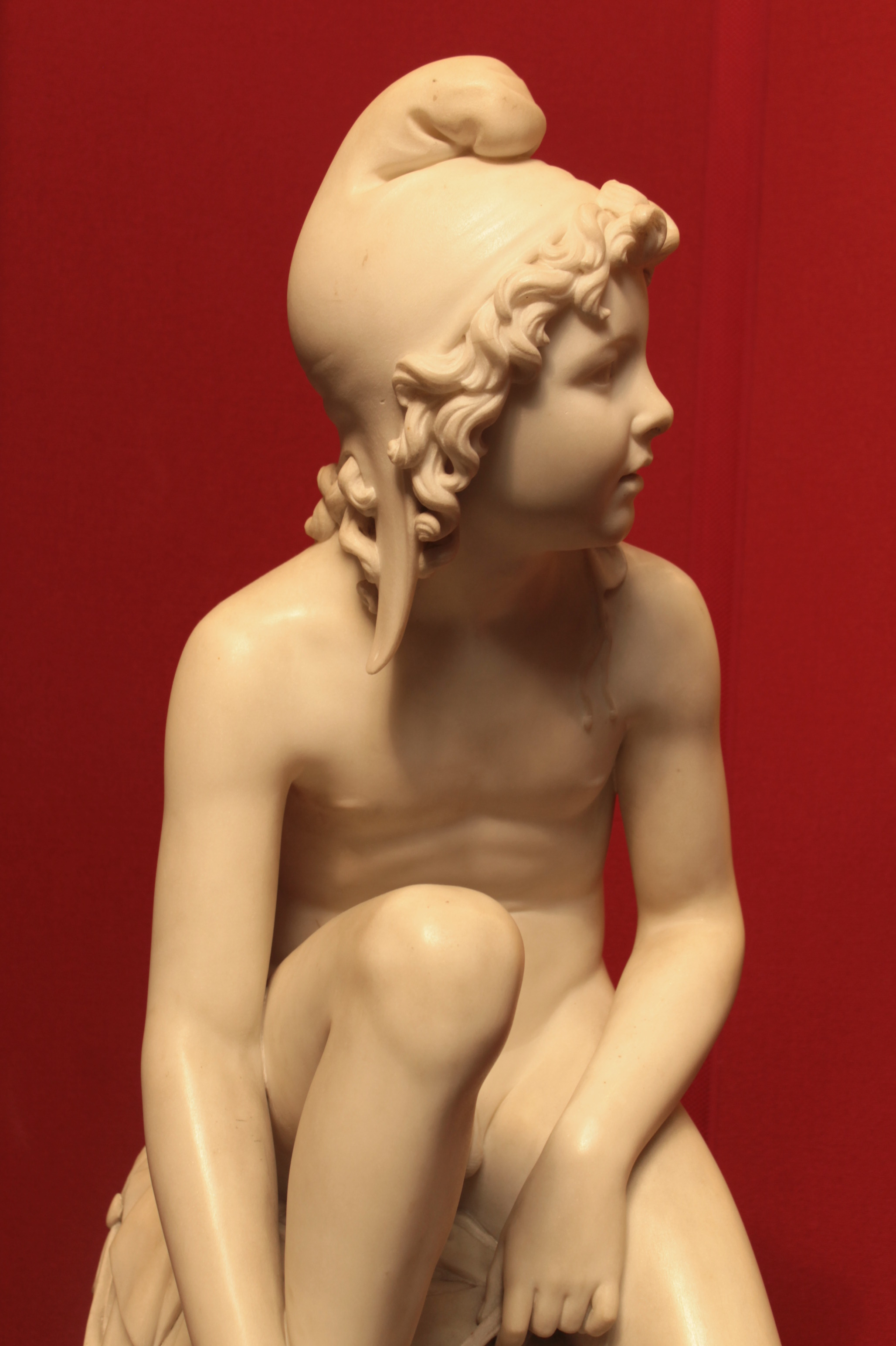
The Young Ascanius by Thomas Campbell 1822

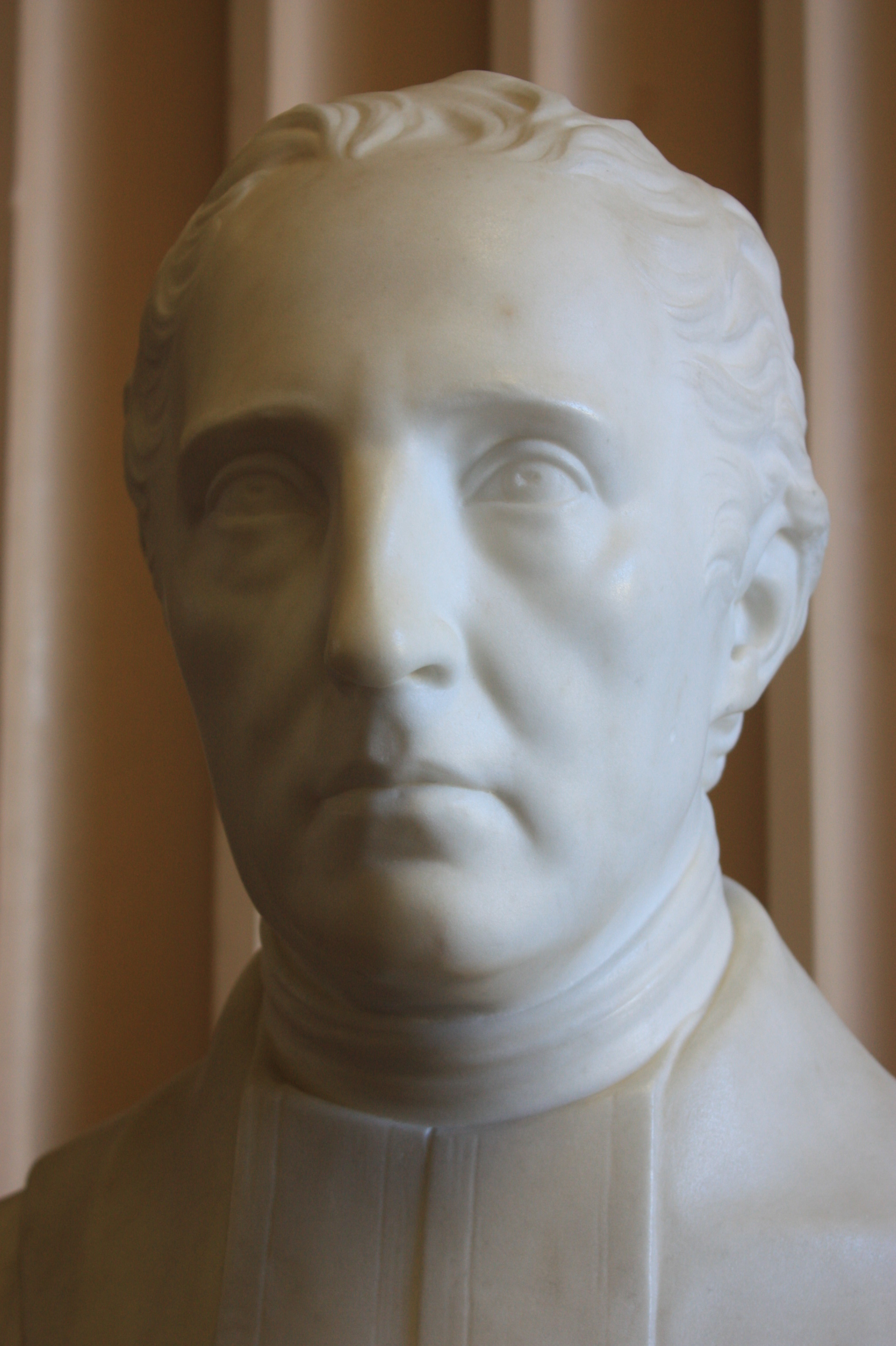
Bust of Robert Blair by Thomas Campbell, 1815, Old College, University of Edinburgh

Thomas Campbell (1 May 1790 – 4 February 1858) was a Scottish sculptor in the early 19th century. He has several important public works, most notably a statue of Sarah Siddons in Westminster Abbey. He also has several works in the National Gallery in London. He was heavily patronised by the British aristocracy, as evidenced by his works.

== Life ==
He was born in Tolbooth parish in Edinburgh Old Town. He was the son of Douglas Campbell, "gentleman servant", and Helen Thorburn.

He was apprenticed to John Marshall, marble cutter on Leith Walk. During his apprenticeship he befriended James Locke, later to be credited with the naming Tweed. Whilst at Marshall's, over three years, he sculpted two figures for the facade of the Royal Bank of Scotland, which around 1817 attracted the patronage of Gilbert Innes of Stow, depute governor of the Bank. He paid for Campbell to study at the Royal Academy Schools in London from 1818, and also permitted him to set up a studio in Rome, Italy in 1819, where a connection continued until 1830. In Rome he met with both Antonio Canova and Bertel Thorvaldsen.

In London he studied under Joseph Nollekens and assisted Edward Hodges Baily. He was briefly assisted in Rome and London by his much younger and short-lived brother, James Campbell (1810–1833).

His London studio was originally at 28 Leicester Square. From 1833 to 1857 his studio was at 15/16 Great Marlborough Street, London. He died unmarried at 1 Great Castle Street in London. He is buried in Kensal Green Cemetery in London.

== Principal works ==
- Heads on the frontage of St Mary's RC Cathedral, Edinburgh (1813)
- Bust of Professor Robert Blair (1815)
- Two figures for the facade of the Royal Bank of Scotland, Edinburgh (1817)
- "Ganymede" for Lord Kinnaird, Rossie Priory (1821)
- Bust of Gilbert Innes of Stow (his patron), Scottish National Portrait Gallery (1821)
- Bronze bust of Henry Raeburn, Scottish National Portrait Gallery (1822)
- "The Young Ascanius", marble figure, National Gallery of Scotland (1822)
- Bust of the Duke of Devonshire (his patron), Chatsworth House (1823)
- Bust of Lady Cullum, Town Hall, Bury St. Edmunds (1824)
- Busts of the Duke of York and Duke of Wellington, Stratfield Saye (1825–27)
- Bust of Pope Pius VII, Royal Collection (1826)
- Bust of Cardinal Ercole Consalvi, Royal Collection (1826)
- The Hopetoun Monument (dismounted bronze equestrian figure of Sir John Hope, governor 1820–23), Dundas House, Edinburgh (1824–29) (originally designed as a centrepiece for Charlotte Square, put in current location in 1834)
- Duchess of Buccleuch monument in Warkton Parish Church in Northamptonshire (1827)
- Bust of Henry Raeburn, Scottish National Portrait Gallery (1827)
- Statue of the Duke of Wellington for Dalkeith Palace (1828)
- Princess Pauline Borghese (Napoleon's sister) at Chatsworth House (1828)
- Countess of Harrowby statue at Sandon Park (1831)
- Monument to Cpt Sir William Hoste, St. Paul's Cathedral (1834)
- Bust of the Duke of Devonshire (his patron), Castle Howard (1834)
- Statue of Arthur Fitzgerald Kinnaird, 10th Lord Kinnaird, 2nd Baron Kinnaird at Rossie Priory (1836)
- Bust of the Duke of Gordon, Windsor Castle (1836)
- Statue of Earl Grey at Howick, Northumberland (1838)
- Recumbent figure of the Countess of Courtown on her tomb, Courtown Church, County Wexford (1839)
- The Duke of York, Castle Esplanade, Edinburgh Castle (1839)
- Monument to the George Gordon, 5th Duke of Gordon, Aberdeen (1839–44) (the first granite statue in Britain). Originally placed in Castlegate it was moved to Golden Square in 1952.
- Marble relief of Sarah Siddons, National Gallery (1843)
- Statue of the Earl of Dalkeith at Dalkeith Palace (1843)
- Statue of Sarah Siddons, St Andrews Chapel, Westminster Abbey (1845)
- Bust of Sir Robert Smirke, British Museum (1845)
- Monument to Lady Whichcote in Aswarby Church (1847)
- Bust of Lord George Cavendish-Bentinck, National Gallery (1848)
- Bust of Henry Montgomery Lawrence, National Gallery (1849)
- Statue of Lord George Cavendish-Bentinck, Cavendish Square, London (1851)
- Bust of Robert Liston, Royal College of Surgeons (1851)
- Bust of Lord Thomas Denman, Eton College (1853)

== Bibliography ==
- Gunnis, Rupert (2009), Dictionary of British Sculptors 1660–1851
- Buildings of Scotland: Edinburgh, by Gifford McWilliam and Walker
- Oxford Dictionary of National Biography : Thomas Campbell
