= Highland Home Industries =

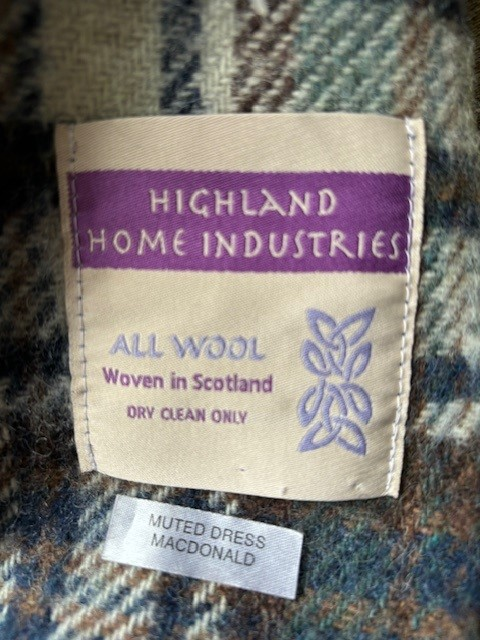
Modern Highland Home Industries label

Highland Home Industries Ltd was a company set up to showcase the work of crafts persons in the Scottish Highlands and Islands. It was established to promote the interests of the home workers, enabling them to find a profitable market for their products. Products included silver jewelry and tweed.

Papers relating to Highland Home Industries Limited are held in the National archives and the archives of the University of Edinburgh.

Queen Mary visited an exhibition of Highland Home Industries work in Glasgow in 1938.

Helma McCallum, Organiser for Shetlands and North of Scotland Area was awarded an MBE in 1961. The shop that she ran closed in the late 1970s. Ethel Jean Stewart (Mrs. Cichla), General Manager, was awarded in Birthday Honours 1968 and Winifred Alured Shand, Organiser in the Outer Hebrides was awarded in 1964.
