= Robert Blair (astronomer) =

Scottish astronomer

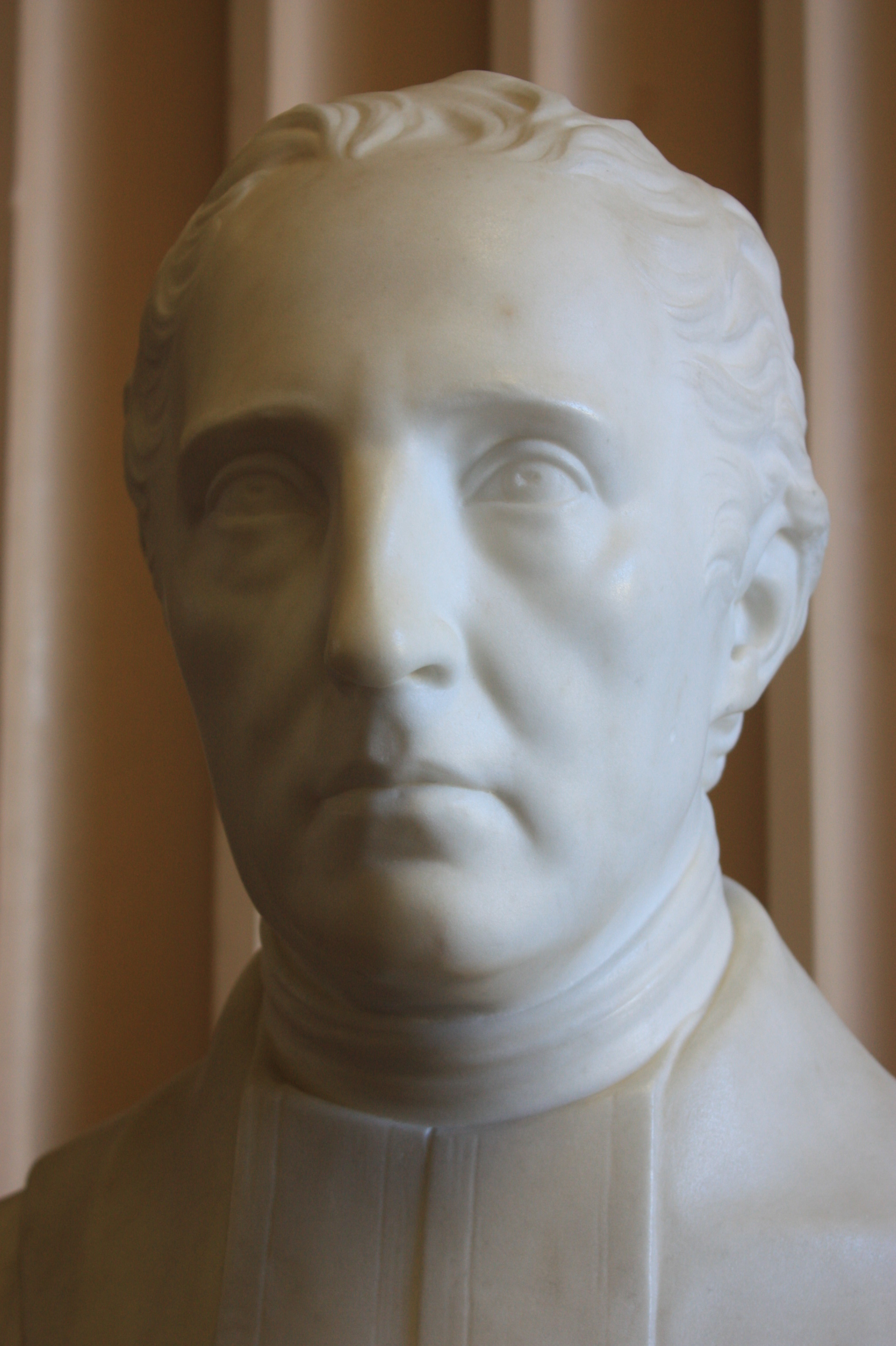
Bust of Robert Blair by Thomas Campbell, 1815, Old College, University of Edinburgh

Robert Blair FRSE (1748 – 22 December 1828) was a Scottish astronomer.

== Life ==
He was born in Garvald, East Lothian, the son of Rev Archibald Blair, the local minister.

In 1773 he was apprenticed to Dr Francis Balfour, a naval surgeon, and served in the Royal Navy in the West Indies. On return to Scotland he studied medicine at the University of Edinburgh and qualified as a doctor in 1785.

Robert Blair was the first Regius Professor of Astronomy at the University of Edinburgh (1785 until death). He invented the aplanatic lens and also coined this term. This was a significant step in reducing the aberration in optical systems. He also experimented with hollow lenses, holding different solutions.

He was elected a Fellow of the Royal Society of Edinburgh in 1786.

He died in Westloch, Berwickshire on 22 December 1828.
