= Edward Alfred Mitchell-Innes =

Edward Alfred Mitchell-Innes, CBE, KC (21 December 1863 – 6 March 1932) was a British barrister. He was Chairman of the General Council of the Bar from 1931 until his death the following year.

Born into a prominent Scottish family, he was the son of Gilbert Mitchell-Innes. Educated at Wellington College and Balliol College, Oxford, he was called to the Bar by the Middle Temple in 1894 and joined the North-Eastern Circuit. eventually becoming its leader. He became a King's Counsel in 1908 and was elected a Bencher of his In 1918. He was appointed a CBE in 1918.

He was Recorder of Middlesbrough from 1915 to 1928, Recorder of Leeds from 1928 until his death, chairman of the Hertfordshire Quarter Sessions from 1924, a Commissioner of Assize since 1930, and Chancellor of the Diocese of Ripon from 1929 until his death. He was Solicitor-General for the County Palatine of Durham from 1930 until his death. He was a JP and deputy lieutenant for Hertfordshire.
