= Gilbert Mitchell-Innes =

Scottish golfer

Personal information
- Nationality: Scotland
- Born: 11 September 1823 Edinburgh, Midlothian, Scotland
- Died: 1 November 1900 (aged 77) Edinburgh, Midlothian, Scotland
- Spouse: Antoinette Amelia MacPherson
- Children: 9

Career
- Sport: Golf
- Status: Amateur

Best results in major championships
- Masters Tournament: DNP
- PGA Championship: DNP
- U.S. Open: DNP
- The Open Championship: 7th: 1869

Gilbert Mitchell-Innes (11 September 1823 – 1 November 1900) was a Scottish amateur golfer. Mitchell-Innes placed seventh in the 1869 Open Championship.

== Early life and marriage ==
Mitchell-Innes was born in Edinburgh, Scotland, on 11 September 1823 into a wealthy family. His great uncle was Gilbert Innes of Stow and it was through him that his father had become enormously wealthy. He was the son of William Mitchell-Innes and Christian Innes (née Shairp). He married Antoinette Amelia MacPherson and the couple would have nine children. One of his sons was the noted barrister Edward Alfred Mitchell-Innes.

His ancestors on the Mitchell side of the family had been merchants in Aberdeen from the 16th century. His father William had inherited a large fortune from his cousin, James Innes, and later changed his name to Mitchell-Innes, and then proceeded to purchase estates at Ayton and Whitehall in Berwickshire.

== Golf career ==
His playing partners were likely many over the years, but he played often with his good friend Thomas Hodge at St. Andrews. As a result, the Mitchell-Innes family came to own several of Hodge's paintings.

=== 1869 Open Championship ===
The 1869 Open Championship was the tenth Open Championship and was held on 16 September at Prestwick Golf Club. Tom Morris, Jr. won the championship for the second successive time, by 11 strokes from Bob Kirk. Just 14 players entered the Championship. Mitchell-Innes had rounds of 64-58-58=180 and finished in seventh place. As an amateur, he was not allowed to accept any prize money.

==== Details of play ====
Tom Morris, Jr. dominated the championship, leading by three strokes after the first round, four after second and eventually winning by 11 strokes. After the first round Davie Strath and Bob Kirk were both three shots behind Morris. Strath was in second place after two rounds but finished with a 60 to finish third behind Kirk who scored 57. Morris's first round included a hole-in-one at the 8th hole and his total of 50 (6-4-4-6-5-5-3-1-6-3-3-4) was only one behind his record of the previous year. In the second round Kirk took four strokes in one bunker (the "Alps"), scoring 10, while in the last round he took three shots in another (the "Cardinal's Nob"). He had four twos over the three rounds.

== Family ==
Mitchell-Innes's grandson, Mandy Mitchell-Innes – when he died on 28 December 2006 – had been the oldest surviving English Test cricketer, having played against South Africa in 1935, when he was an Oxford undergraduate.

== Death and legacy ==
Mitchell-Innes died on 1 November 1900 at Inverleigh Place, Edinburgh, Scotland. He is best remembered for having one top-10 finish (7th) in The Open Championship in 1869.
