= Stymie =

Archaic rule in the game of golf

Davie Grant is stymied on the 17th green at North Berwick, Scotland, and is attempting to chip his ball over the ball that is blocking the hole (c. 1888).

A stymie was a situation in greens play in golf where one player's ball blocked the path of another's to the cup, governed by a now obsolete rule of golf. Formerly, the blocked player was not afforded relief, and had to chip over or putt around the obstructing ball. Today, the blocking ball is temporarily removed to afford a clear line to the hole without penalty to the putter or advantage to the player whose ball is moved.

Various changes to the stymie rule were attempted or enacted by the United States Golf Association (USGA) between 1920 and 1941. Finally, in 1952, the stymie was eliminated when the USGA and Royal and Ancient Golf Club of St Andrews (R&A) established a joint set of rules.

== Rule history ==
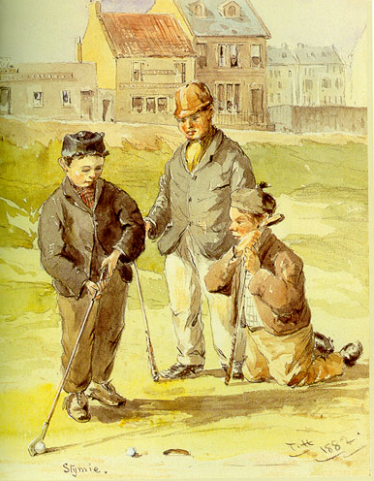
Stymie, an 1882 watercolor by Thomas Hodge

In singles match play when one player's ball blocked the path of another player's ball on the green, but the two were not within six inches of each other, the obstructing ball was not lifted. This forced the player who was further away from the hole to either attempt to chip his ball over the obstructing ball or to putt around it. If his ball struck the opponent's ball, his next shot would have to be played from where his ball came to rest and his opponent, when it was his turn to play, had the choice to attempt his putt from his ball's original position or its new one. If the player's ball knocked the obstructing ball into the cup, his opponent was considered to have holed out on the previous shot.

=== Modifications ===
In 1920, the United States Golf Association tested a modified stymie rule for one year, allowing a stymied player to concede the opponent's next putt. The next change to the stymie rule came in 1938, when the USGA began a two-year trial in which an obstructing ball within 6 inches (15 cm) of the hole could be moved regardless of the distance between the balls. The USGA made this rule permanent in 1941. However, during this time, the Royal and Ancient Golf Club of St Andrews never modified their stymie rule.

=== Abolishment ===
The stymie rule was abolished in 1952, when the first jointly published set of rules established by the USGA and the R&A came into effect.
