= Gilbert Innes =

Scottish banker and antiquarian (1751–1832)

Gilbert Innes FRSE DL MWS
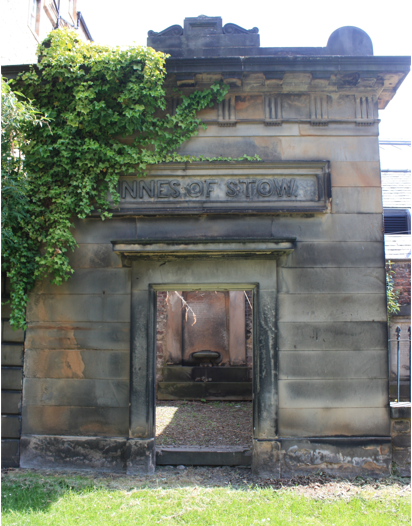
- Tomb of Innes
- Born: 7 February 1751
- Died: 26 February 1832 (aged 81)
- Burial place: Greyfriars Kirkyard
- Occupations: Banker, antiquarian
- Children: ~67
- Family: Gilbert Mitchell-Innes (grand-nephew)

Gilbert Innes of Stow FRSE DL MWS (7 February 1751 – 26 February 1832) was a Scottish banker, antiquarian and patron of the arts during the Scottish Enlightenment. He served as Deputy Governor of the Royal Bank of Scotland for 38 years. He was described as "the richest commoner in Scotland". A notorious womaniser, another more damning quote was "the acts of his whoredom are written in the parish chronicles of Scotland". He had at least 67 illegitimate children.

== Life ==
Innes was born on 7 February 1751 the fourth son of Marion Lauder of Huntly Wood and her husband, George Innes of Stow. His father was second cashier of the Royal Bank of Scotland later becoming Cashier (the then equivalent of Chief Executive of the bank). He was the great-grandson of John Lauder, Lord Fountainhall.

Innes studied at the University of Edinburgh but did not graduate. By the time of his father's death in 1780, Innes was the sole surviving son, and inherited the family estate of Stow, near Lauder in the Scottish Borders. In 1787 Gilbert became a Director of the Royal Bank of Scotland. He helped the Bank survive the financial crises of 1793 and 1797.

In 1793, Innes was one of the jury on the trial of Thomas Muir of Huntershill on the charge of sedition (campaigning for parliamentary reform).

In 1800, he was elected a Fellow of the Royal Society of Edinburgh. His proposers were John Walker, Sir James Hall, 4th Baronet and Thomas Charles Hope. He was Deputy Lieutenant of Edinburgh and was created a Freeman of the City in 1814. At this time he lived at 24 St Andrew Square in Edinburgh's New Town.

In 1815, he became the artistic patron of Thomas Campbell. Other artists in his patronage included Henry Raeburn who was also a close friend. Also a keen musician he was patron to the Edinburgh violinist, Matthew Hardie. He had a fine singing voice and was a chorister with the Edinburgh Music Society based at St Cecilia's Hall .

In 1820, he purchased rights to work coal in southern Edinburgh around the Drum Estate, later to become the Seafield Mine.

He died at St Andrew Square following a brief illness on 26 February 1832 a few days after his 81st birthday. He is buried in Greyfriars Kirkyard in Edinburgh in the section known as the Covenanters Prison.

== Other positions ==
- Treasurer of the Highland Society 1814–1832
- Treasurer of the Pitt Club 1814–1832
- Manager of Edinburgh Royal Infirmary
- Member of the Board of Manufactures
- Director of the Edinburgh Assembly Rooms
- Member of the Society of Antiquaries of Scotland
- Member of the Walpole Society

== Family ==
Although he never married, Innes is said to have fathered 67 illegitimate children.

On his death, his fortune of over £1million was left to his sister Jane Innes. It was the largest ever inheritance in Scotland at that time and equates to around £115 million in modern terms. When his sister died childless and without a will in 1839 a scramble for the fortune began amongst his numerous illegitimate children. The personal estate ultimately passed to his nephew (a second sister's son) William Mitchell, cashier (Chief Executive) of the Royal Bank of Scotland 1814 to 1825, who thereafter was known as William Mitchell-Innes. However, the real estate went to Alexander Mitchell, thereafter known as Alexander Mitchell-Innes, who was Jane's heir-at-law.

William's son was the golfer, Gilbert Mitchell-Innes, named after his wealthy great uncle.

His illegitimate daughter, Elizabeth Burnet Innes, married his junior colleague, John Dewar FRSE.
