= Thomas Hodge (illustrator) =

English painter

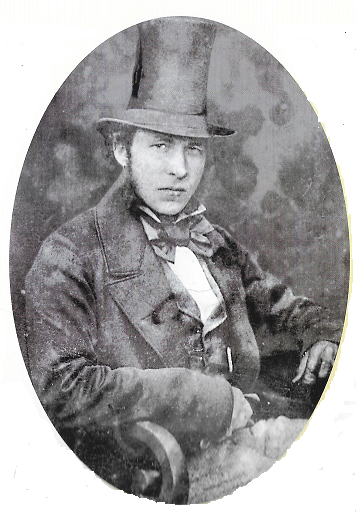
- Hodge wearing a stovepipe hat and buckskin gloves, c. 1854
- Born: 1827; Cornwall, England
- Died: 20 May 1907 (aged 79–80); Kilburn, Middlesex, England
- Occupations: Painter; illustrator
- Spouse: Jane Frances Hodge
- Children: 7

Thomas Hodge (1827 – 20 May 1907) was an English golf illustrator and painter. He became a member of the Royal and Ancient Golf Club at St Andrews in 1861 and via his thousands of golf illustrations of what were then the greatest golfers in the world he became known as "the golf artist of St Andrews".

After his death, Hodge's work had for the most part fallen into obscurity and had been forgotten. Then, in 1983, a large cache of his watercolors was found in a battered and dusty red album and bought from an African antiques dealer peddling his wares at the Camden Lock Market. Many of the paintings were subsequently offered for sale at Sotheby's in 1985. It made perfect sense that Hodge's work was found collecting dust at the Camden Market — his last known address was only two miles away at Quex Road, just off the Kilburn High Road.

A large collection of Hodge's paintings was donated to the Royal and Ancient Golf Club at St Andrews by Hodge's only living grandchild, Norah Sheward. Due to the notoriety of the Sotheby's sale, the Old Course – elated to receive such historical works on the history of golf – billed Hodge as "artist to the Royal & Ancient Golf Club" when the pictures were displayed by them at the University of St Andrews art gallery in April 1986.

== Early life ==
Hodge was born in 1827 in Cornwall, England, near Truro. He was the fourth and youngest son of Joseph A. Hodge, a banker who was the son of a tin and copper miner. Having grown up in Cornwall, Hodge was familiar with the fury of the sea as a boy. He would often walk the shore after storms to find ships that had gone aground. He painted and drew many of the hulks which were grim reminders of the dangers associated with sea travel.

=== Military career ===
At the urging of his father, Hodge enrolled in the Royal Military Academy at Woolwich, near London, on 1 August 1842. His banker father, who had squandered his wealth on bad investments in a proposed Cornwall and Devon Railway, had difficulty paying the yearly Academy dues of £80 for board and tuition and as a result Hodge was discharged on 6 March 1846.

=== Opens boarding school ===
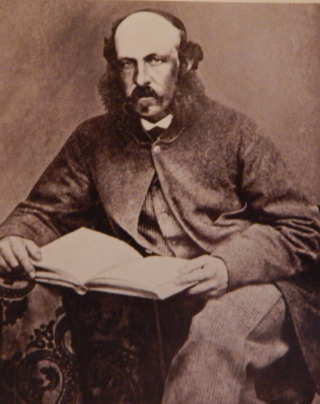
Hodge, c. 1867–72

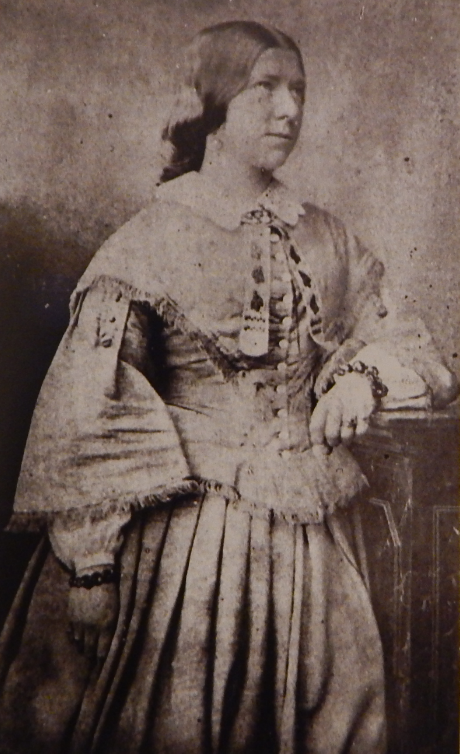
Sarah F. Hodge, c. 1854

Down on his luck and nearly penniless, he moved to St Andrews, Scotland, in the 1850s and opened a boarding school that was intended mainly for the children of Scottish parents who lived abroad and were working for the East India Company. In addition to his three older brothers, Hodge also had five sisters. One sister, Sarah Frances "Fan" Hodge, was very helpful to him when he founded his boarding school. It is unclear how, and from whom, he was able to obtain the capital necessary for this business endeavor as a boarding school proprietor.

It was during this time in the 1850s that Hodge became a friend and frequent playing companion of Gilbert Mitchell-Innes, a crack amateur golfer who would later post a top-10 finish in the 1869 Open Championship.

=== Hodge the sportsman ===
Hodge was an avid sportsman who excelled at cricket, boxing, running, and racquet sports. He was a fine rifle marksman, one of the best in Britain, and his skills on a billiards table were exceptional. After moving to St Andrews, Hodge became a useful golfer in his own right, often playing well enough in medal matches at St Andrews to find himself amongst the leaders if not winning outright.

In 1862 he came second and won the silver Bombay Medal with 97. Eleven years later, in 1873, he once again placed second with a score of 99 and was awarded the Bombay Medal. At the Autumn Meeting in 1866 and 1867, Hodge won the King William IV gold medal (known as the Royal Medal) shooting 97 and 96 and won again in 1869 with an 89, a score beaten only by George Glennie who carded 88 in 1855. These scores may seem high in comparison to modern golf, but in Hodge's day the golf clubs were crude and the feathery ball in use at the time traveled at most about 200 yards without wind assistance.

== Later life ==
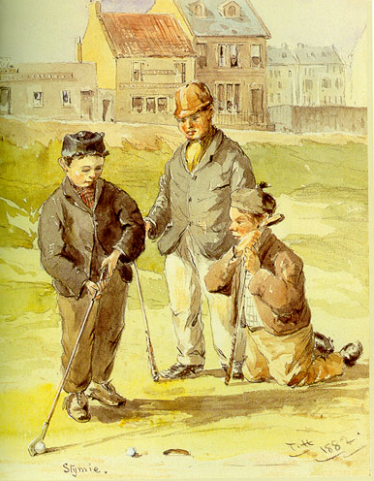
Stymie, an 1882 watercolor by Hodge depicting children playing golf at St Andrews, Scotland

In the early 1890s illustrated books had become commonplace. Hodge knew dozens of golfers and took the time to paint pictures of them, in both oil paint and watercolors. As his work became more popular, he was hired to illustrate golf books, including work done for golf volumes published by the Badminton Library. He contributed to Horace Hutchinson's Golf (1890), as well as Hutchinson's The Book of Golf and Golfers (1900) with numerous plates and illustrations. Many of his paintings were miniatures that he would, upon completion, gift to the golfer who was the subject of the work.

Some of Hodge's paintings have brought good sums at auction. In the case of a pen and monochrome watercolor depicting J. O. Fairlie (a mentor to Old Tom Morris), the hammer price at an 8 July 1999 Christie's auction in London, South Kensington, was $13,386 (£8,050).

Hodge's painting was not limited to just golf subjects. When he went on vacations abroad he always brought along his paints and canvases and produced a number of scenic plein air landscape and seascape paintings. He nearly always signed his paintings as "TH" and dated his work. In 1863, while on a vacation to Switzerland, he painted an alpine scene featuring the Matterhorn in the background.

== Family ==
Hodge and his wife Jane had seven children, three boys and four girls. His sons were Edward Hamilton "Ned" Hodge, Donald William Mackinnon "Dod" Hodge and Thomas Kenwyn Hodge. The last born was his daughter Emma Mary "Dickie" Hodge when her father was nearly 60 years old. For Hodge, having a child at such an advanced age was a source of much "masculine pride".

== Death and legacy ==
Hodge died on 20 May 1907 in Kilburn, Middlesex, England. After a prolific career as a painter of golf genre subjects in and around the St Andrews area, he became known as "the golf artist of St Andrews". He exhibited at the Royal Scottish Academy from 1878–80.

== Gallery of Hodge works ==
(selective)

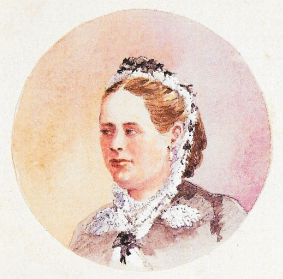
Jane F. Hodge, as painted by Thomas Hodge, c. 1862

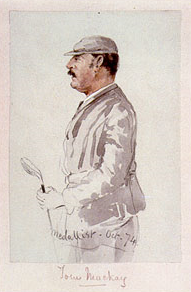
An 1874 watercolor of Scottish golfer Tom Mackay

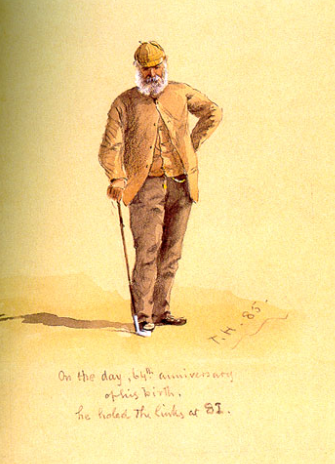
An 1885 watercolor depicting Old Tom Morris who had, on his 64th birthday, shot a score of 81 on the Old Course.

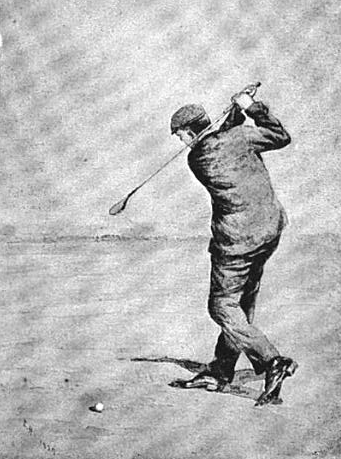
An 1887 watercolor of Hugh Kirkaldy

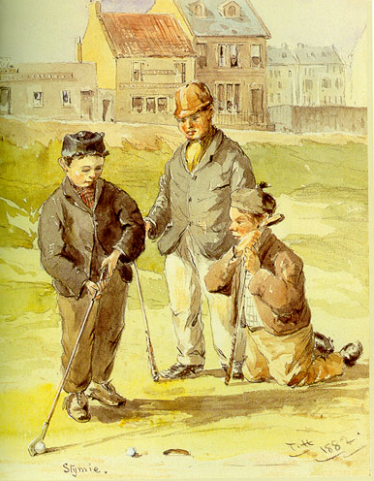
Stymie, an 1882 watercolor of young boys putting

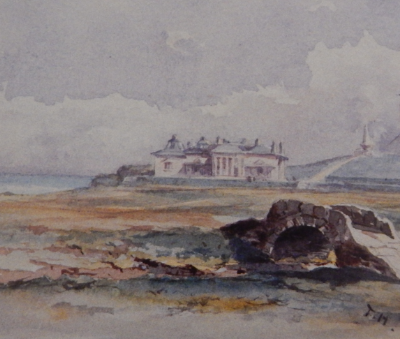
A watercolor painted in 1879 by Hodge of the Swilcan bridge at the Old Course, St Andrews

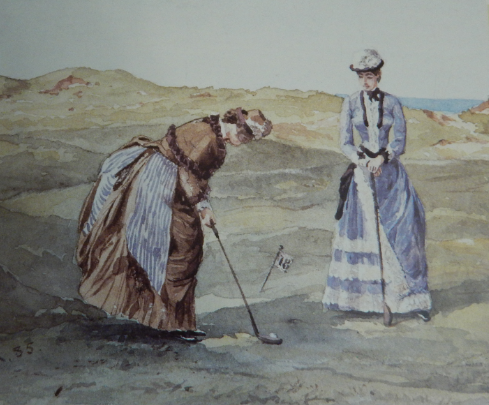
A watercolor executed in 1885 by Hodge of two ladies putting on the Old Course at St Andrews

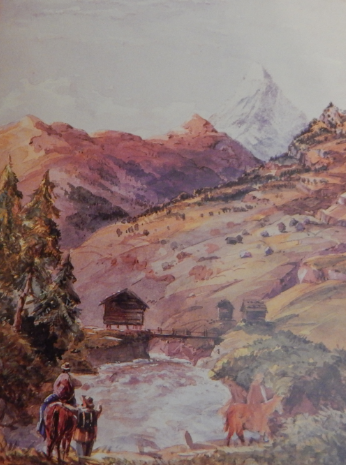
An 1863 watercolor by Hodge while he was on vacation in Switzerland. The Matterhorn is shown in the distance.
