= James Locke (draper) =

Scottish-born 19th Century London draper (1800 - 1867)

- Born: c. 1800; Edinburgh, Scotland
- Died: 5 February 1867 (aged 66–67); Kensington, England, United Kingdom
- Resting place: Highgate Cemetery
- Occupation: Draper
- Spouse: Catherine Adam Gregg (m. 1837)
- Children: 8

James Locke (c. 1800 - 5 February 1867) was a Scottish-born 19th Century London draper who is attributed with the creating the name Tweed for the rough woollen cloth, which he was largely responsible for popularising amongst fashionable Victorian society.

== Career ==
James Locke was born in Edinburgh, Scotland in 1800 and was brought up the Edinburgh suburb of Lochend. In the early 1820s he moved to the Covent Garden area of London and set up in business as an intermediary between Scottish woollen cloth manufacturers and London tailors and consumers. Locke's fortunes were transformed when around 1830 he moved his business premises to 119 Regent Street, London's prestigious shopping street. It was not long before the members of the nobility and fashionable West End society were regular frequenters of his shop. Queen Victoria and Prince Albert were customers of Locke, ensuring a thriving business which meant that he found it necessary to keep a large stock of Scotch woollen goods. This enabled him to expand into the wholesale business, supplying cloth to tailors and clothiers in London and the country. Locke is credited with creating mixtures of colour in Tweed, which he designed to blend in with the rural Scottish landscape, making the material ideal for shooting jackets, providing both warmth and camouflage.

Locke is also widely credited with giving Tweed its name. Tweels were established woollen products of shepherd's plaids, and a letter was sent to Locke by a Hawick manufacturer of tweels about 1831, offering tweels or tweeled (cloth). The letter was misread as tweed by one of Locke's clerks, and understood to be a trade-name for the cloth taken from the name of the River Tweed, which flows through the Scottish Borders textile areas. Messrs Locke advertised the product as Tweed and since then it has been the generic name for this type of fabric.

In common with many successful Victorians, Locke was a supporter of various philanthropic causes, including being on the committees of the Ragged School Union and the Scottish Hospital Charity.

== Fishing ==
Locke's passion was fly fishing for Salmon and Trout. As a boy he fished the rivers round his Edinburgh home and in later life wrote a book for his sons entitled Tweed and Don, or Recollections and Reflections of an Angler, which he had published in Edinburgh in 1860. It was written in the spirit of Izaak Walton's The Compleat Angler, extolling the pastoral joys of a day's fly fishing.

== Personal life ==
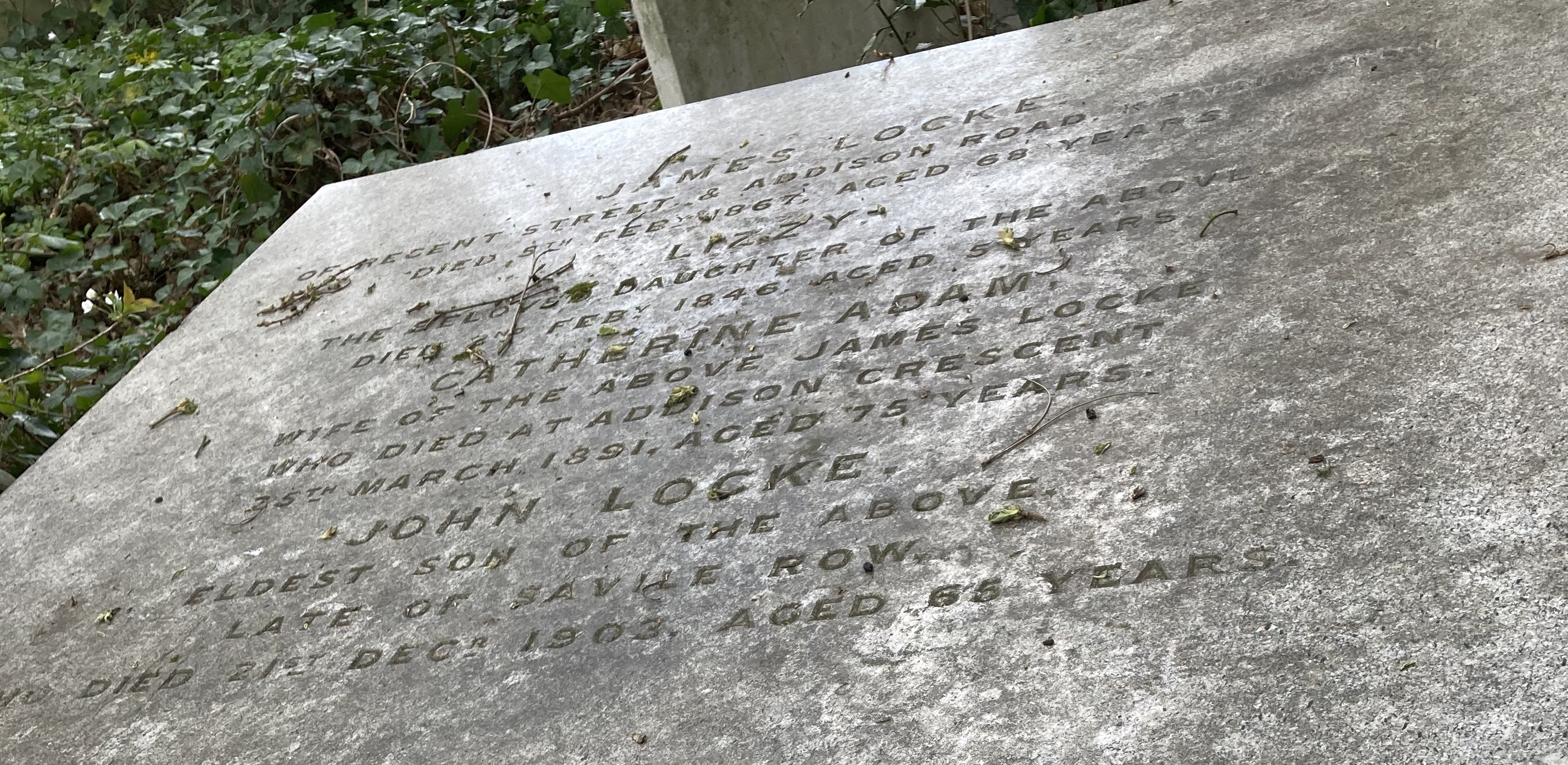
Family grave of James Locke in Highgate Cemetery

James Locke married Catherine Adam Gregg, a native of Ayrshire, in Edinburgh on the 6th March 1837 and they had eight children between 1838 and 1854: John, Elizabeth, Thomas, James, Jenny, Daniel, Kathy and Agnes.

Amongst his friends were the sculptor Thomas Campbell (1790–1858) and George Brunton (1799–1836) a Scottish lawyer and journalist who established the weekly Saturday newspaper, The Patriot.

He died at his home in Addison Road, Kensington on 5 February 1867 and is buried in a family grave on the west side of Highgate Cemetery with his wife Catherine, eldest son John and daughter Elizabeth (Lizzie).
