= James Lock =

James Lock may refer to:

- James Lock (sound engineer) (1939–2009), two-time Grammy Award winner in the area of classical music
- James Lock, early owner (from 1759), and head of James Lock & Co., hatters in London
- James Lock (TV personality), English television personality
