= Tweed =

Rough, unfinished woollen fabric, of a soft, open texture

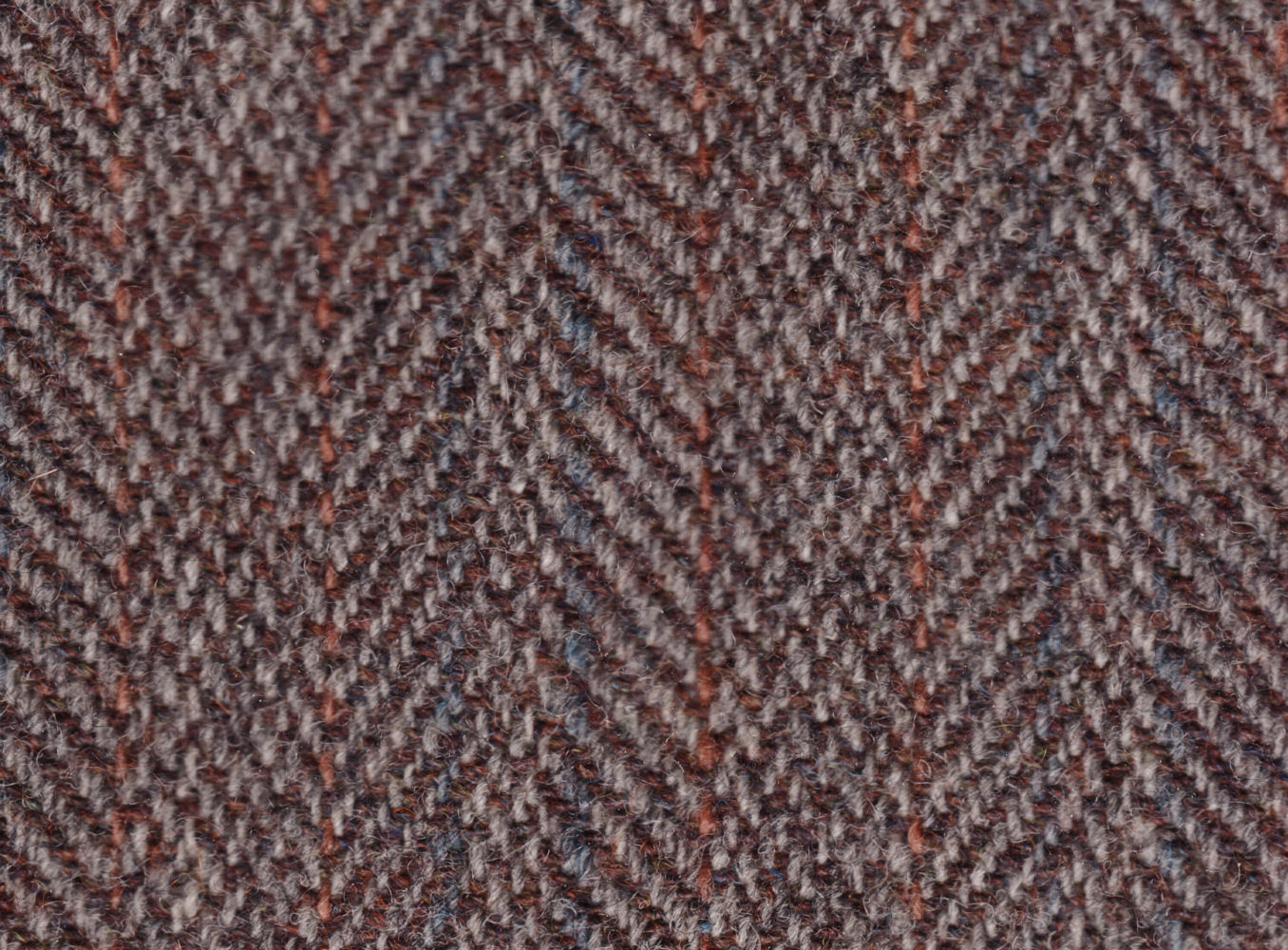
Harris Tweed woven in a herringbone twill pattern, mid-20th century

Tweed is a rough, woollen fabric, of a soft, open, flexible texture, resembling cheviot or homespun, but more closely woven. It is usually woven with a plain weave, twill or herringbone structure. Colour effects in the yarn may be obtained by mixing dyed wool before it is spun.

Tweeds are a staple of traditional Scottish, Irish, Welsh, and English clothing, being desirable for informal outerwear, due to the material being moisture-resistant and durable. Tweeds are made to withstand harsh climates and are commonly worn for outdoor activities such as shooting and hunting. In Ireland, tweed manufacturing is now most associated with County Donegal. In Scotland, tweed manufacturing is most associated with the Isle of Harris in the Hebrides.

== Etymology ==
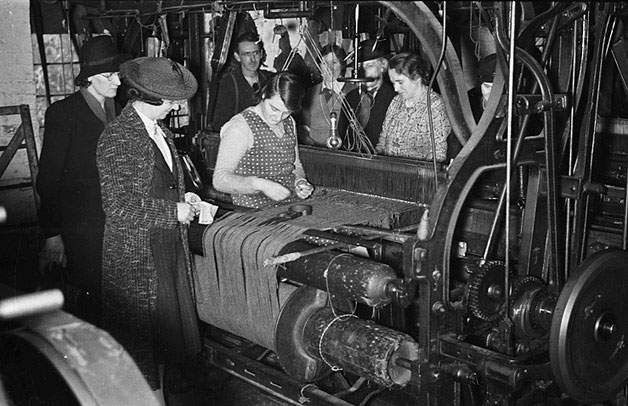
Tweed making at the Leach family woollen mill at Mochdre, Powys, Wales, 1940

The original name of the cloth was tweel, Scots for twill, the material being woven in a twilled rather than a plain pattern. A traditional story has the name coming about almost by chance. Around 1831, a London merchant, James Locke, received a letter from a Hawick firm, Wm. Watson & Sons, Dangerfield Mills about some "tweels". The merchant misinterpreted the handwriting, understanding it to be a trade-name taken from the River Tweed that flows through the Scottish Borders textile area. The goods were subsequently advertised as Tweed and the name has remained since.

== Traditions and culture ==
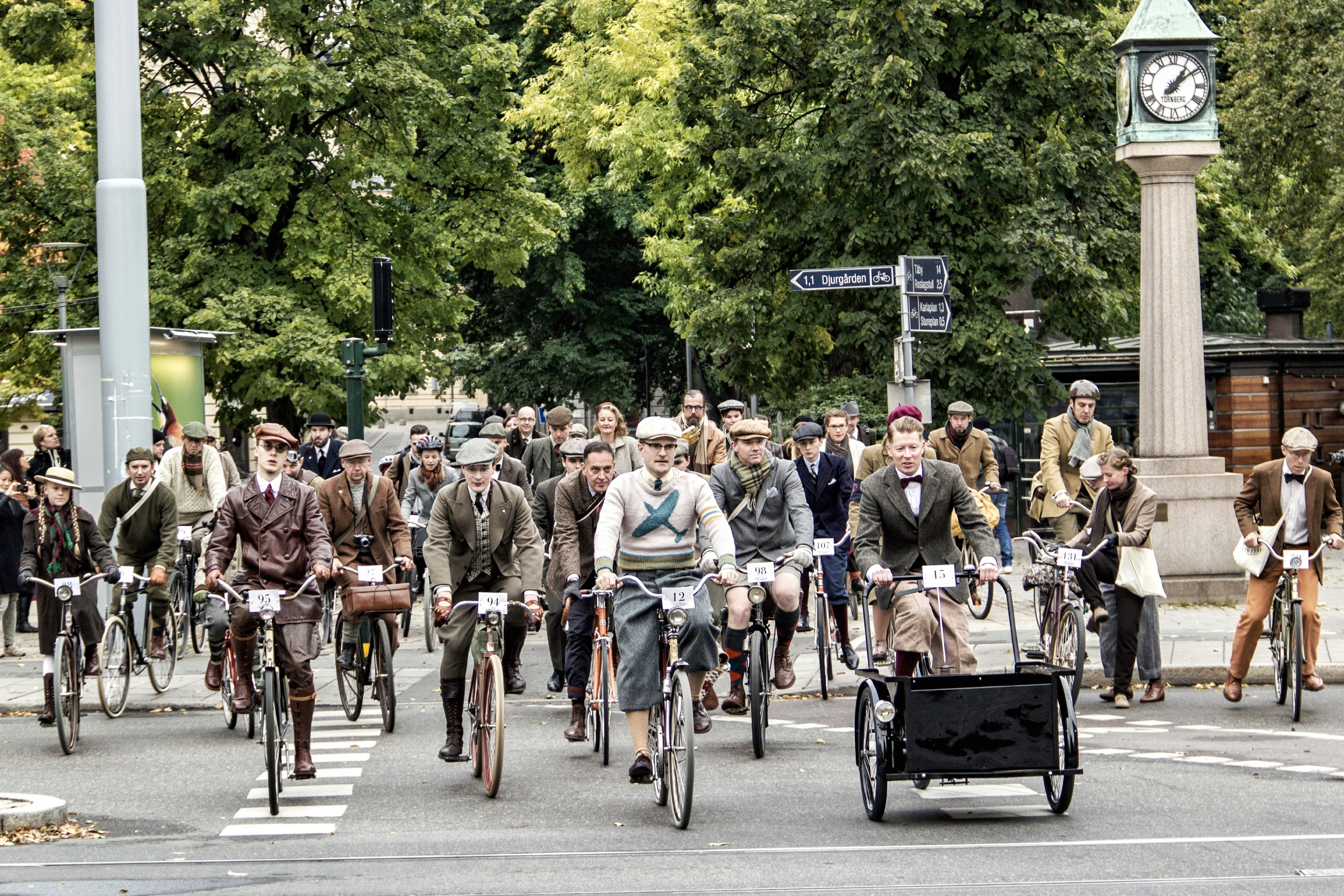
Bike in Tweed, Stockholm 2013

Traditionally used for upper-class country clothing such as shooting jackets, tweed became popular among the Edwardian middle classes who associated it with the leisurely pursuits of the elite. Due to their durability, tweed Norfolk jackets and plus-fours were a popular choice for hunters, cyclists, golfers, and early motorists, hence Kenneth Grahame's depiction of Mr. Toad in a Harris Tweed suit. Popular patterns include houndstooth, associated with 1960s fashion, windowpane, gamekeeper's tweed worn by academics, Glen plaid check, originally commissioned by Edward VII, and herringbone.

During the 2000s and 2010s, members of long-established British and American land-owning families started to wear high-quality heirloom tweed inherited from their grandparents, some of which pre-dated the Second World War. In modern times, cyclists may wear tweed when they ride vintage bicycles on a Tweed Run. This practice has its roots in the British young fogey and hipster subcultures of the late 2000s and early 2010s, whose adherents appreciate both vintage tweed, and bicycles.

=== Musical instruments ===
Some vintage Danemann upright pianos have a tweed cloth backing to protect the internal mechanism. Occasionally, Scottish bagpipes were covered in tweed as an alternative to tartan wool.

The term "tweed" is used to describe coverings on instrument cables and vintage or retro guitar amplifiers, such as the Fender tweed and Fender Tweed Deluxe. Despite the terminology, many of these coverings were not considered tweed but cotton twill due to the cover's design, which caused this misidentification of the design.

== Types of tweed ==
- Harris Tweed: A handwoven tweed, defined in the Harris Tweed Act 1993 as cloth that is "Handwoven by the islanders at their homes in the Outer Hebrides, finished in the Outer Hebrides, and made from pure virgin wool dyed and spun in the Outer Hebrides".
- Donegal tweed: Originally a handwoven tweed which has been manufactured for several centuries in County Donegal, Ireland, using wool from locally-bred sheep and dye from indigenous plants such as blackberries, gorse (whins), and moss. Irish tweed more generally was once made throughout the country, with Ardfinnan tweed being a historic example.
- Silk tweed: A fabric made of raw silk with flecks of colour typical of woollen tweed.
- Saxony tweed: Originated in Saxony, Germany. It is a fabric made from the wool of merino sheep. It is very smooth and soft.
- Cheviot tweed: A tweed made from the wool of Cheviot sheep, originally from the Cheviot Hills in the Scottish Borders and Northumberland. It is traditionally tightly spun and woven and considered very durable and hardwearing. It is associated with gamekeepers, hunting and thornproof tweed.

== Gallery ==
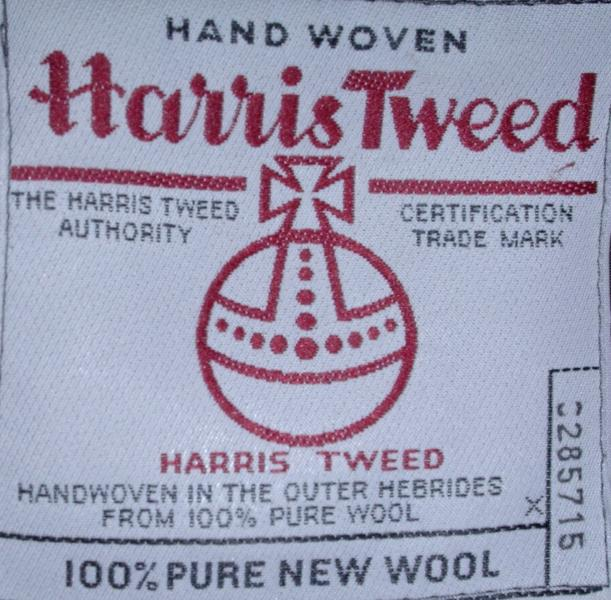
Logo of the Harris Tweed authority

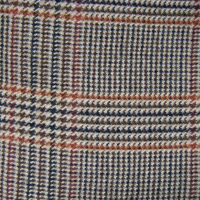
Glen plaid, Glenurquhart, or Prince of Wales check, frequently used to make overcoats and sportcoats in the 1950s

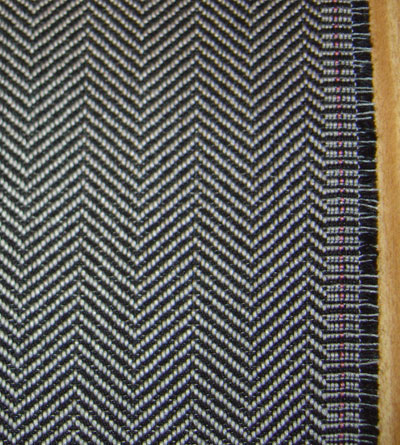
Example of the herringbone pattern, a popular choice for suits and outerwear

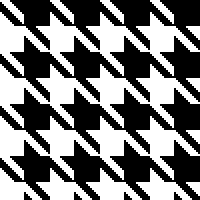
Houndstooth, the basis of the keeper's tweed popular among the upper classes from the 1860s until the 1930s

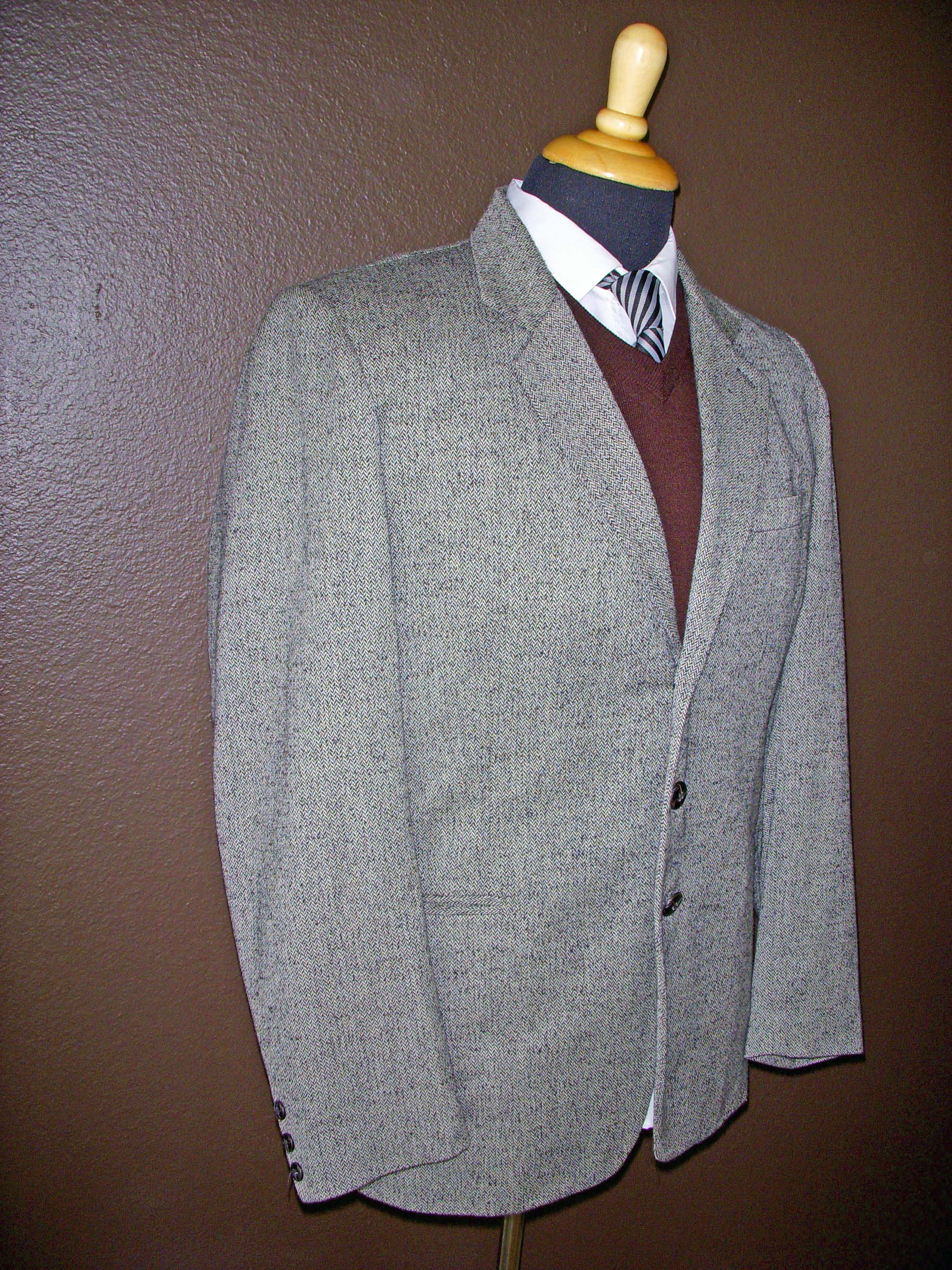
Grey Donegal tweed sportcoat

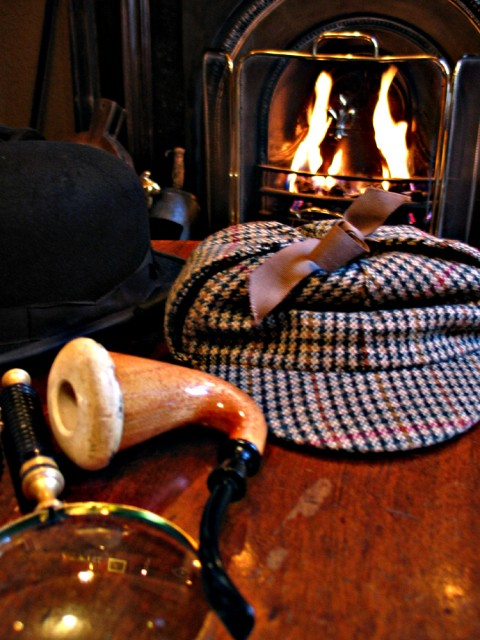
A deerstalker hat made of district or gamekeeper's tweed (contrasting mustard, green and brown checks)

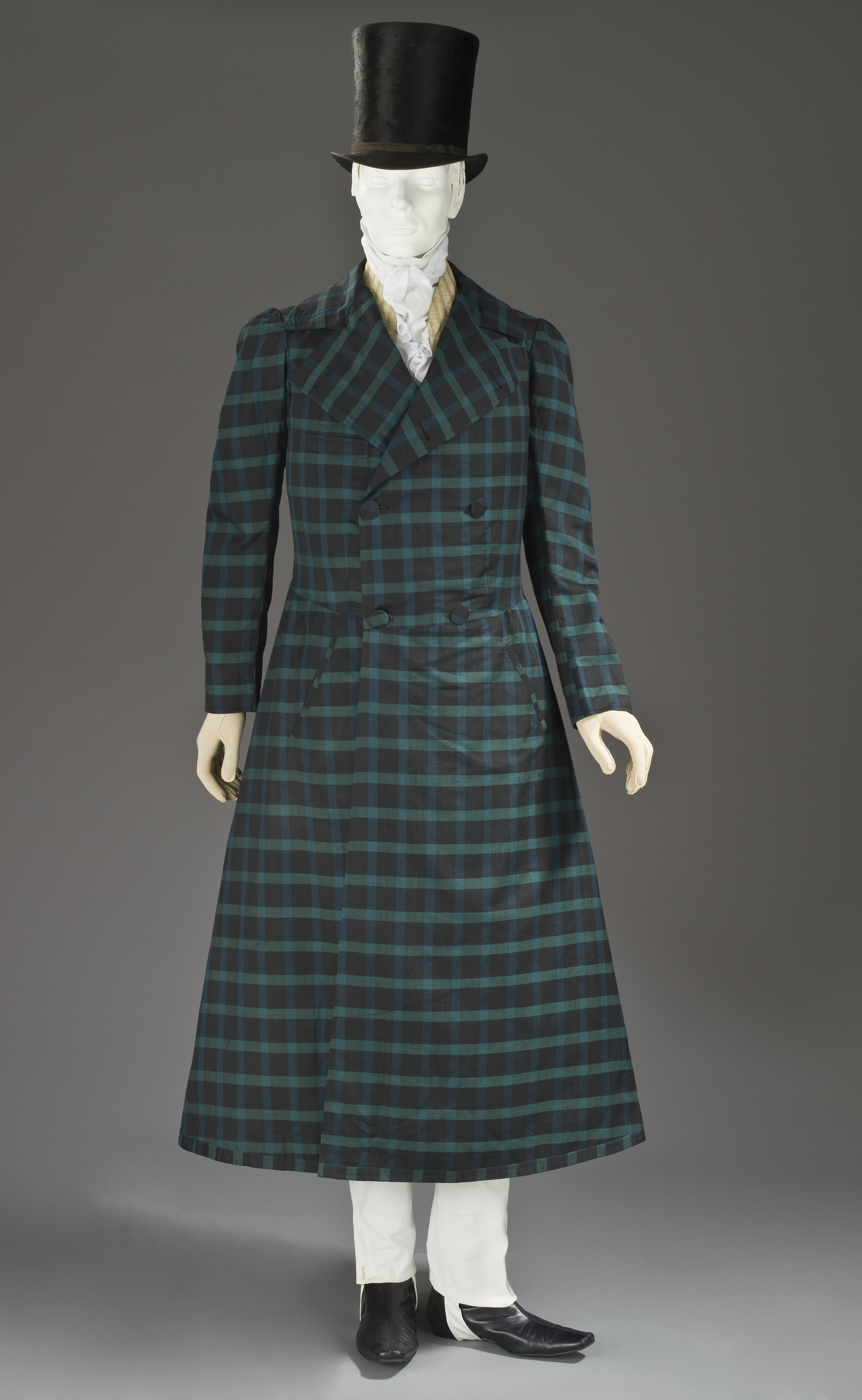
Windowpane tweed popular in the late 19th century and again in the 1970s

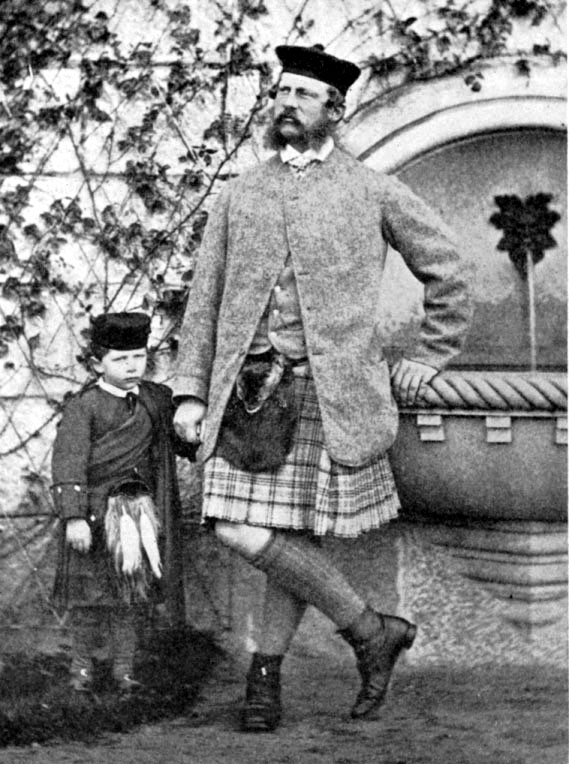
Frederick III with his young son Wilhelm wearing highland dress including tweed kilt jacket

Hunting apparel belonging to Gustaf V of Sweden, 1930s.

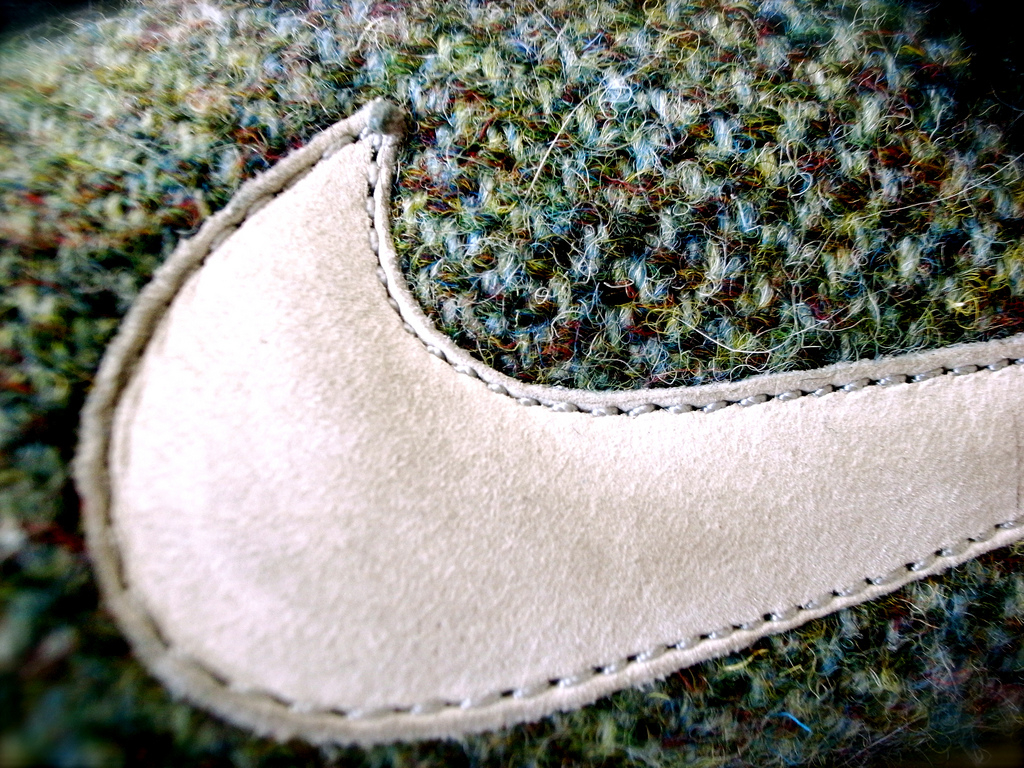
Harris Tweed Nike

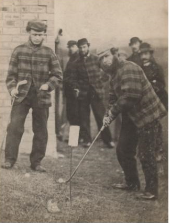
Charlie Hunter (left) watches as Old Tom Morris plays a shot in 1863 at Prestwick. Both of the players are wearing the traditional tweeds.

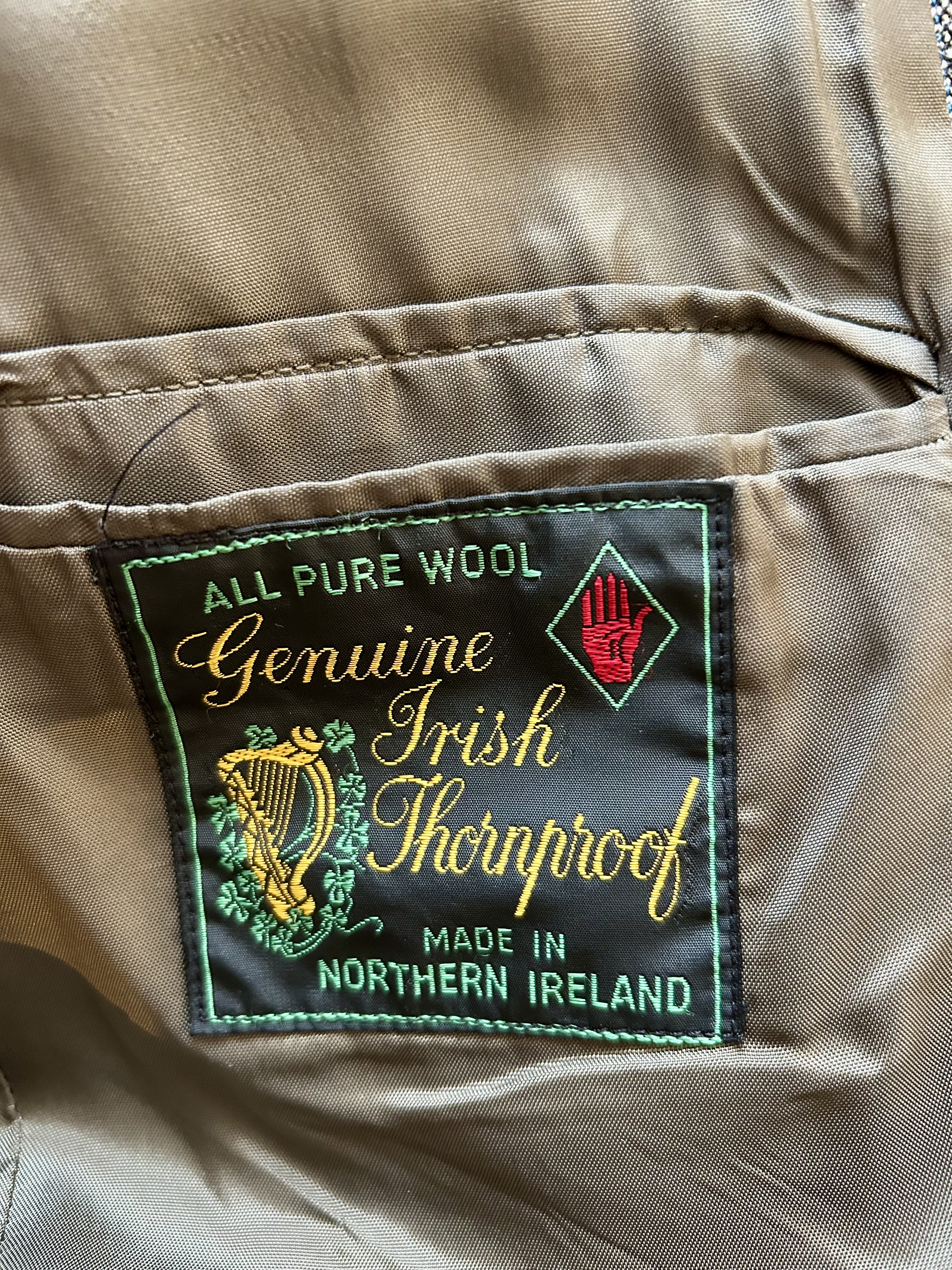
Thornproof tweed jacket label

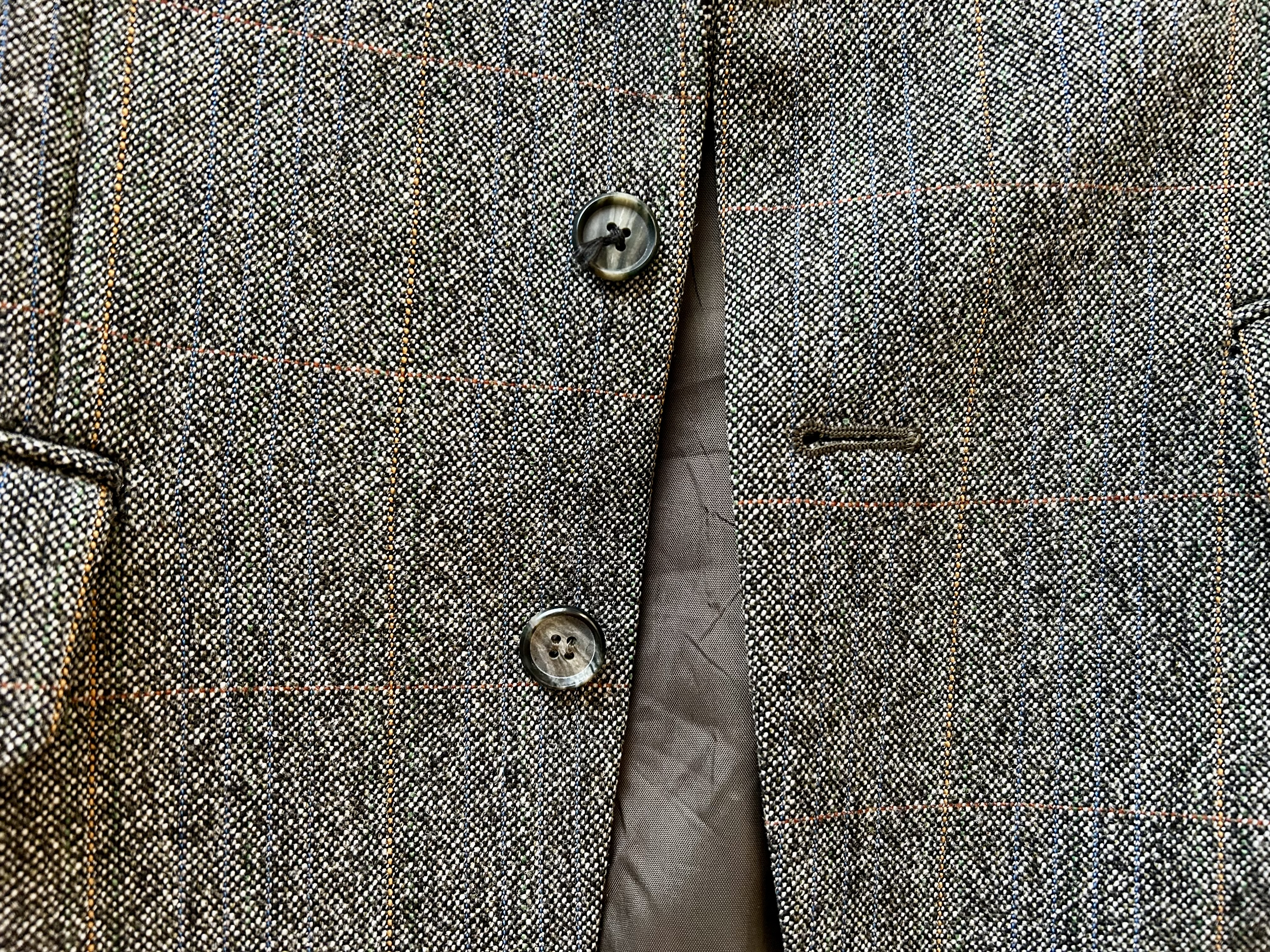
Thornproof tweed jacket

== See also ==
- 1920s in fashion
- 1950s fashion
- 1960s fashion
- 1970s fashion
- 2000s in fashion
- 2010s in fashion
- British country clothing
- Norfolk jacket
- Sport coat
- Woollen industry in Wales
