= Van Aaken =

Van Aaken is a surname. Notable people with the surname include:

- Anne van Aaken (born 1969), German lawyer and economist
- Ernst van Aaken (1910–1984), German sports physician and athletics trainer

== See also ==
- Van Aken
- Van Auken (disambiguation)
