= Auken =

Auken is a surname. Notable people with the surname include:

- Ida Auken, Danish politician
- Kirsten Auken, Danish politician
- Margrete Auken, Danish politician
- Sabine Auken, German bridge player
- Svend Auken, Danish politician

== See also ==
- Auke (name)
- Van Auken (disambiguation)
