= Drapery =

Depiction of the folds and woven patterns of loose-hanging clothing on the human form

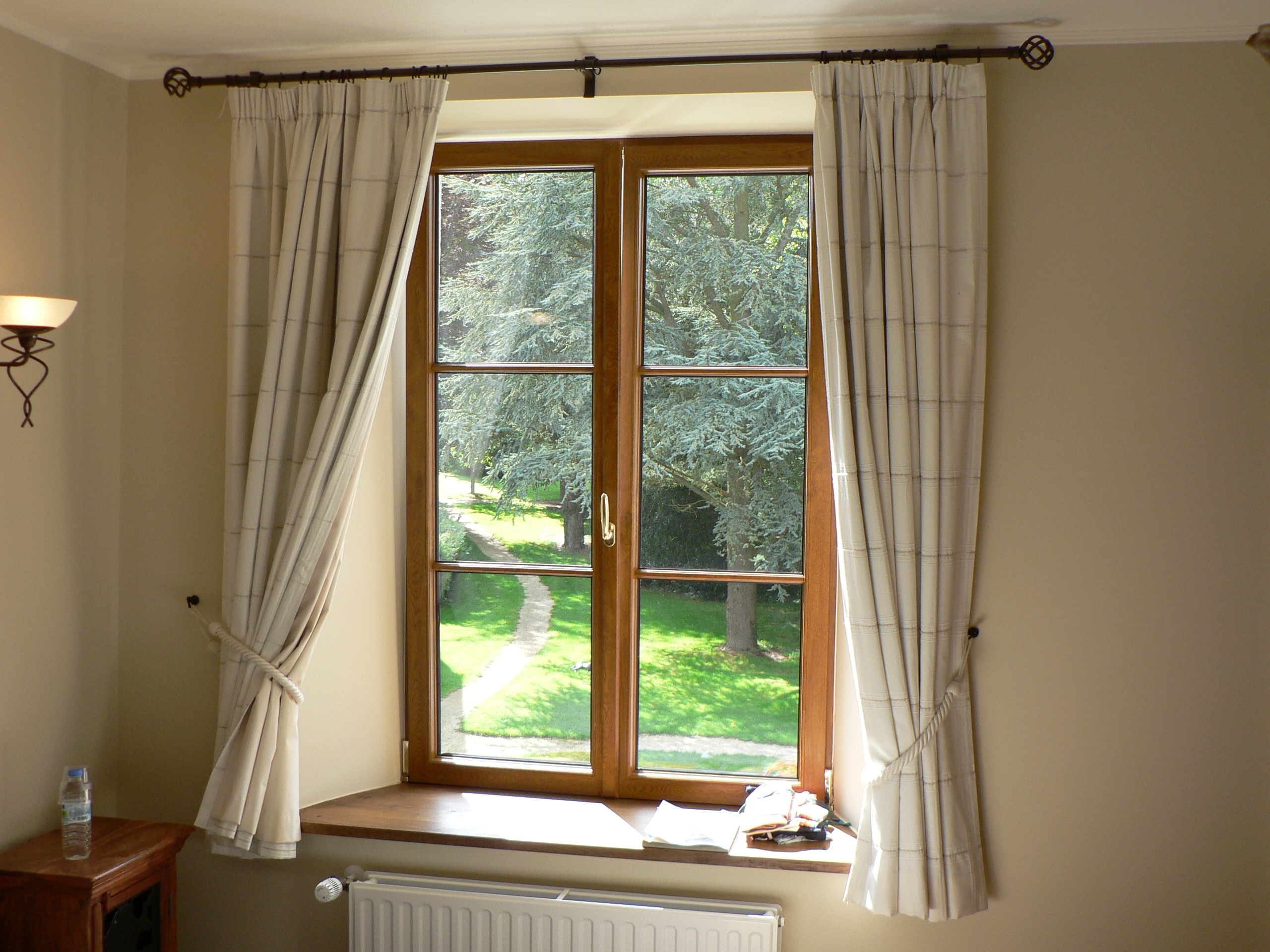
Drapery used as window curtains

Drapery is a general word referring to cloths or textiles (Old French draperie, from Late Latin drappus). It may refer to cloth used for decorative purposes – such as around windows – or to the trade of retailing cloth, originally mostly for clothing, formerly conducted by drapers.

== Drape ==
Drape (draping or fabric drape) is the property of different textile materials describing how they fold, fall, or hang over a three-dimensional body. Draping depends upon the fiber characteristics and the flexibility, looseness, and softness of the material. Draped garments follow the form of the human body beneath them.

== Art ==
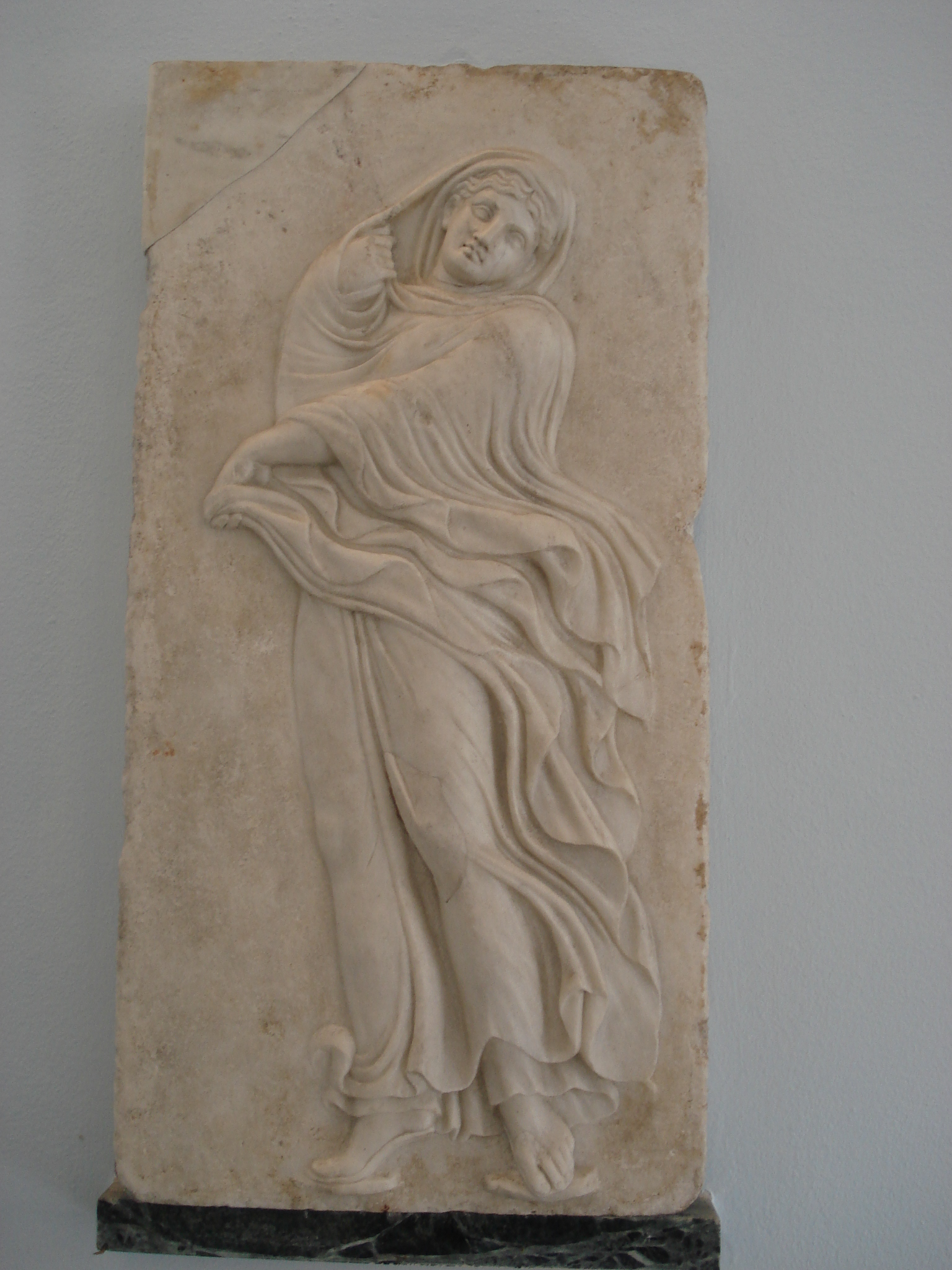
Funerary stele of a Greek dancer, 400s BC

In art history, drapery refers to any cloth or textile depicted, which is usually clothing. The schematic depiction of the folds and woven patterns of loose-hanging clothing on the human form, with ancient prototypes, was reimagined as an adjunct to the female form by Greek vase-painters and sculptors of the earliest fifth century and has remained a major source of stylistic formulas in sculpture and painting, even after the Renaissance adoption of tighter-fitting clothing styles. After the Renaissance, large cloths with no very obvious purpose are often used decoratively, especially in portraits in the grand manner; these are also known as draperies.

For the Greeks, as Kenneth Clark noted, clinging drapery followed the planes and contours of the bodily form, emphasizing its twist and stretch: "floating drapery makes visible the line of movement through which it has just passed.... Drapery, by suggesting lines of force, indicates for each action a past and a possible future." Clark contrasted the formalized draperies in the frieze at Olympia with the sculptural frieze figures of the Parthenon, where "it has attained a freedom and an expressive power that have never been equalled except by Leonardo da Vinci". Undraped male figures, Clark observed, "were kept in motion by their flying cloaks."

In 18th century England, many of the leading portrait painters with a large workshop engaged the services of drapery painters, who were specialists who painted the dress, costumes and other accessories worn by the sitters in portrait paintings. While the portraitist completed the face and hands, the drapery painter was responsible for the pose and costume. These specialists were not necessarily assistants in the workshop of the portrait painters but rather subcontractors. The Flemish painter Joseph van Aken was the leading drapery painter in 18th century England working for most portrait artists and as a consequence many of the works of English portrait artists of that period are often difficult to distinguish one from another.

== Interior design ==
In interior design, drapery refers almost exclusively to window treatments. It is often used as a focal point alongside the windows or as a way to help block sun/glare. There is general agreement that drapery in design is more substantial and weightier than other window treatments, such as curtain paneling. Drapes are also normally lined, whereas curtain panels normally are not. You can have drapery that is sheer, light filtering, room darkening or blackout; so they can be used in almost every room of the house if desired. Drapery is also considered a relatively permanent installation, adding an integral element to the room's design by adding color or pattern to complement the rest of the architectural and soft elements.

== Gallery ==
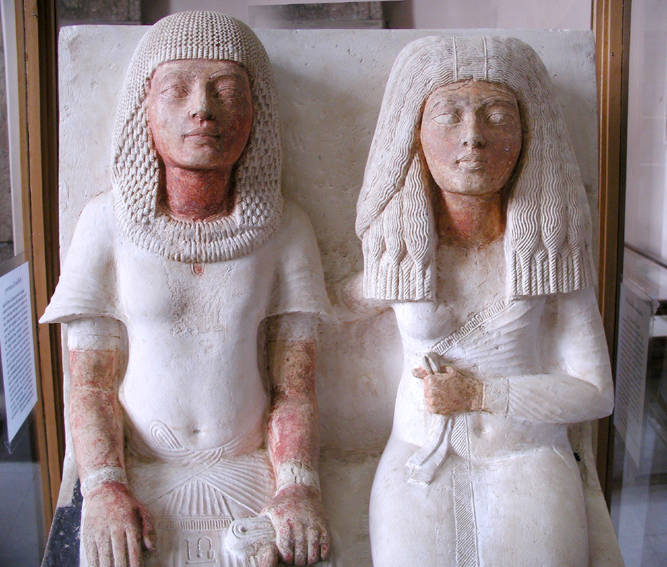
Portrait of Meryre and Iniuia, 18th Dynasty, c. 1300 BC

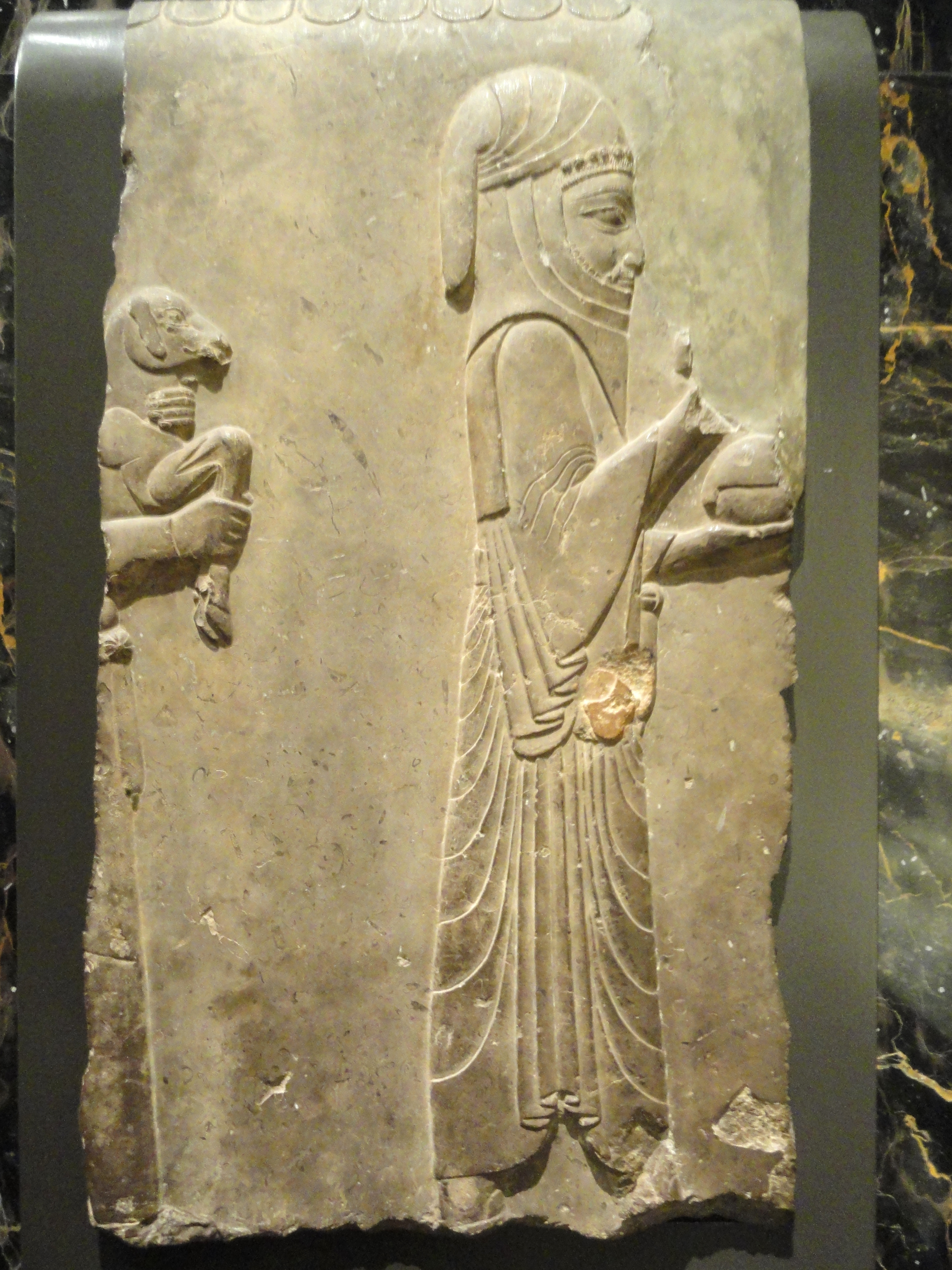
Palace servants, Persepolis, 5th-4th century BC

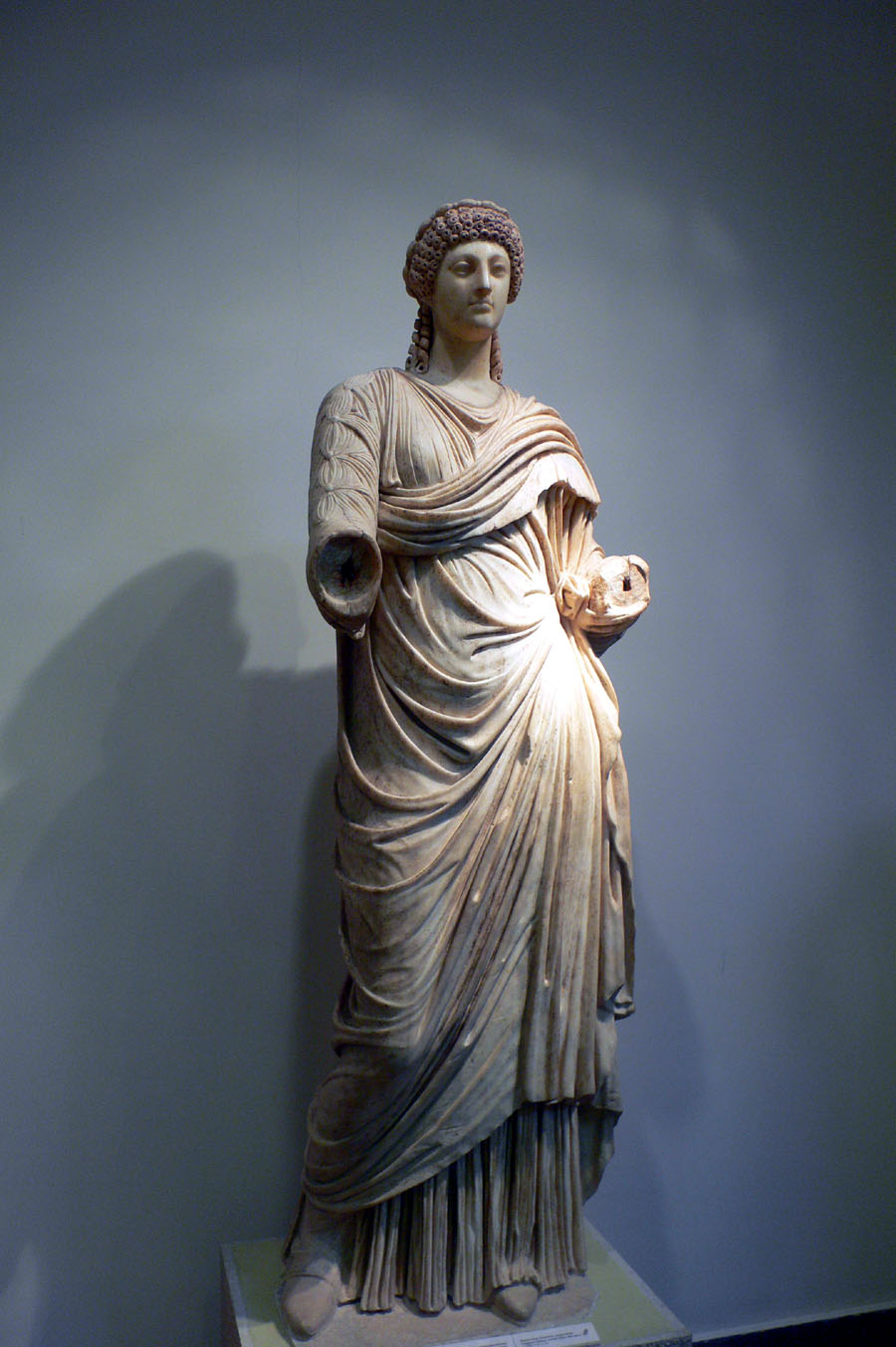
Poppaea, wife of Nero

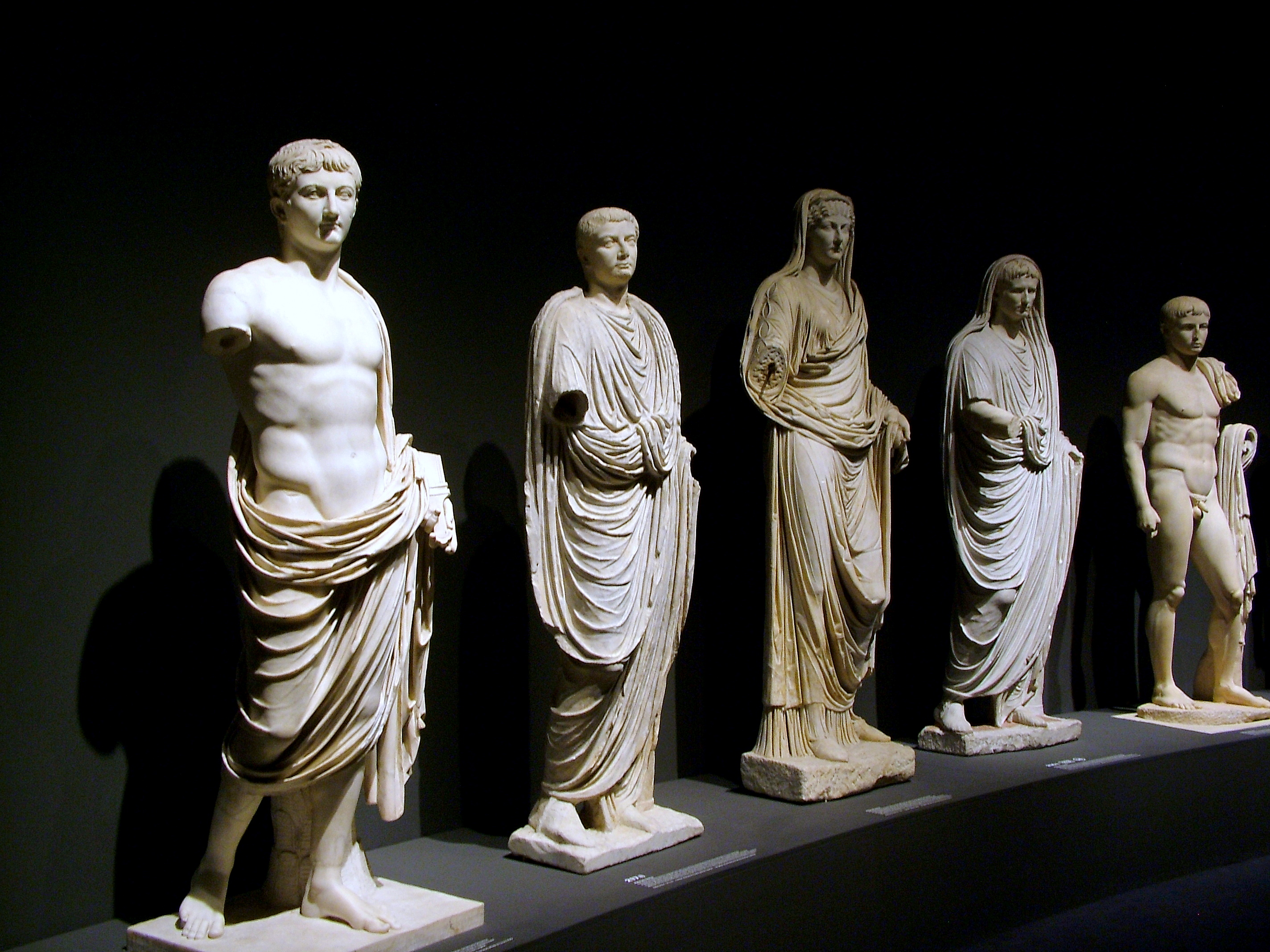
Statues of the Roman Empire

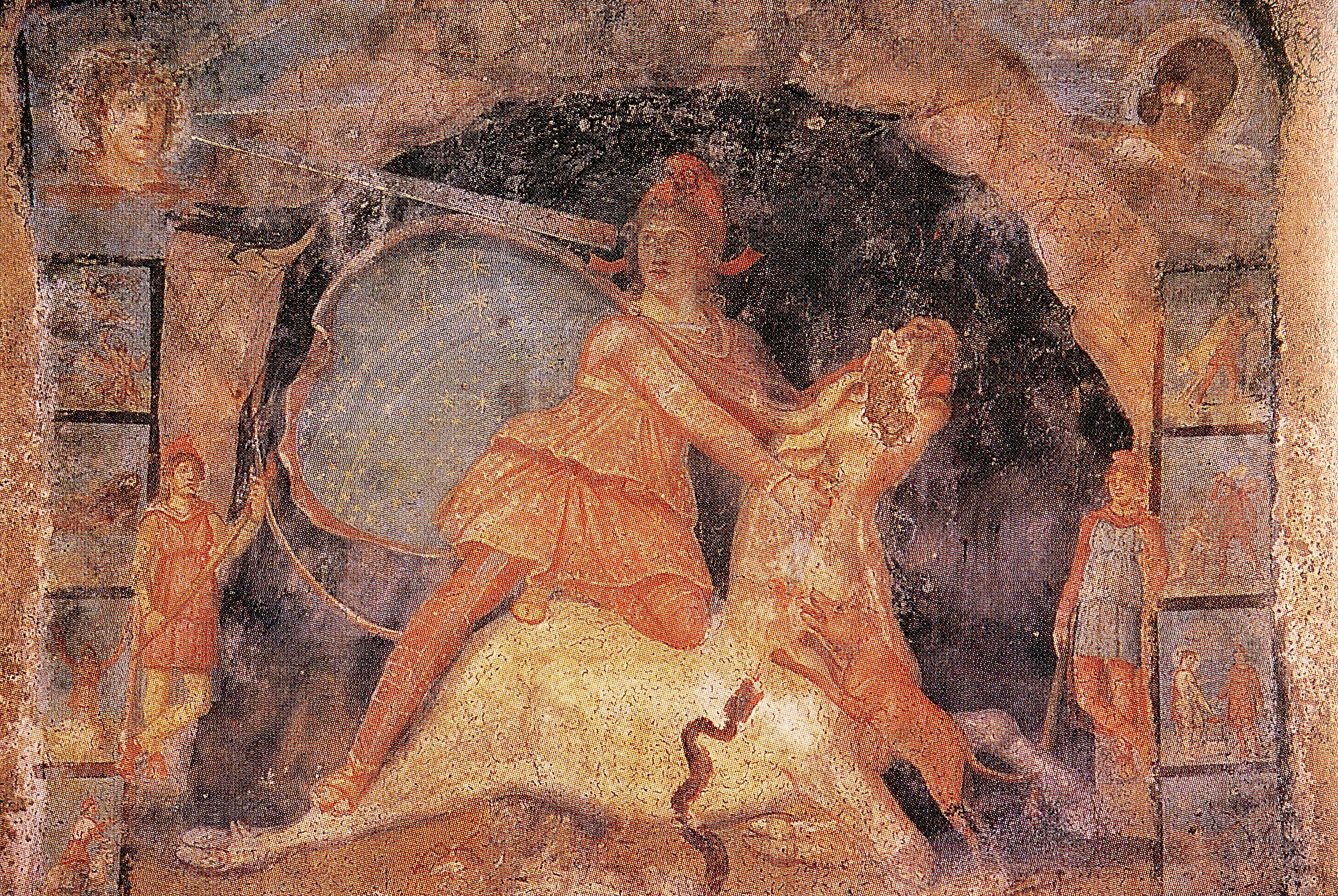
Fresco of Mithras and the Bull from the mithraeum at Marino, 3rd century CE

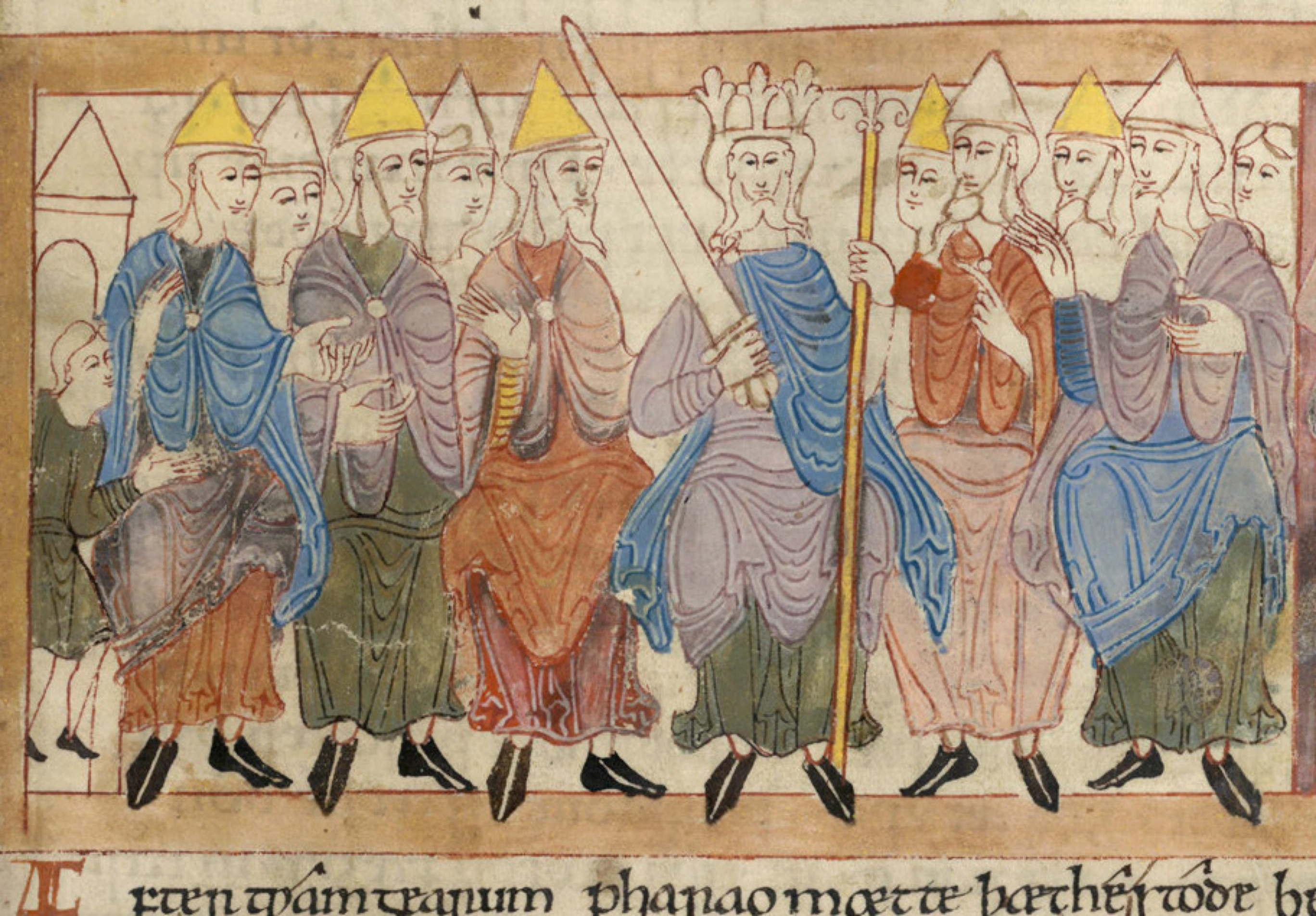
Anglo-Saxon king and witan, 900s AD

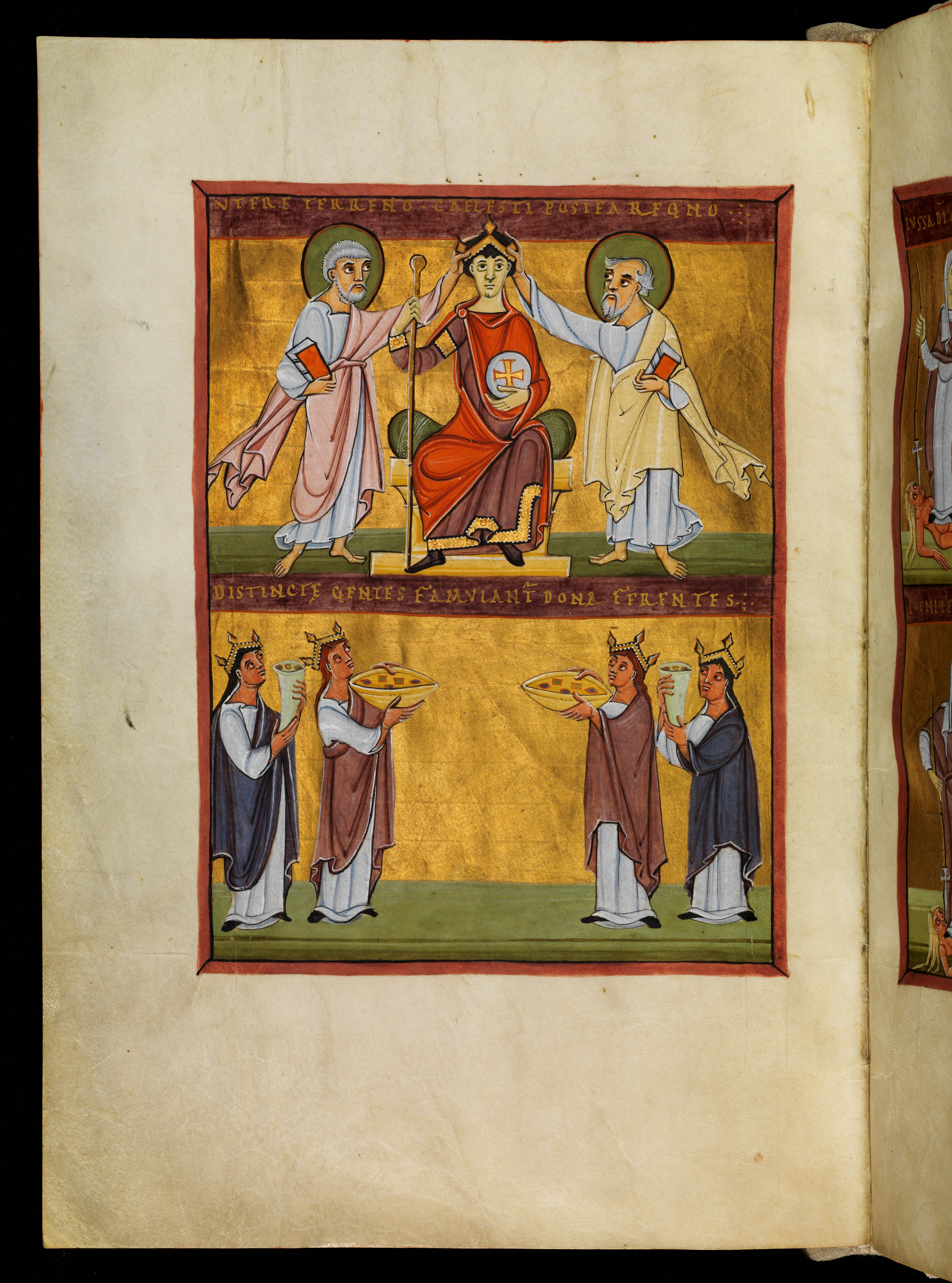
The Bamberg Apocalypse

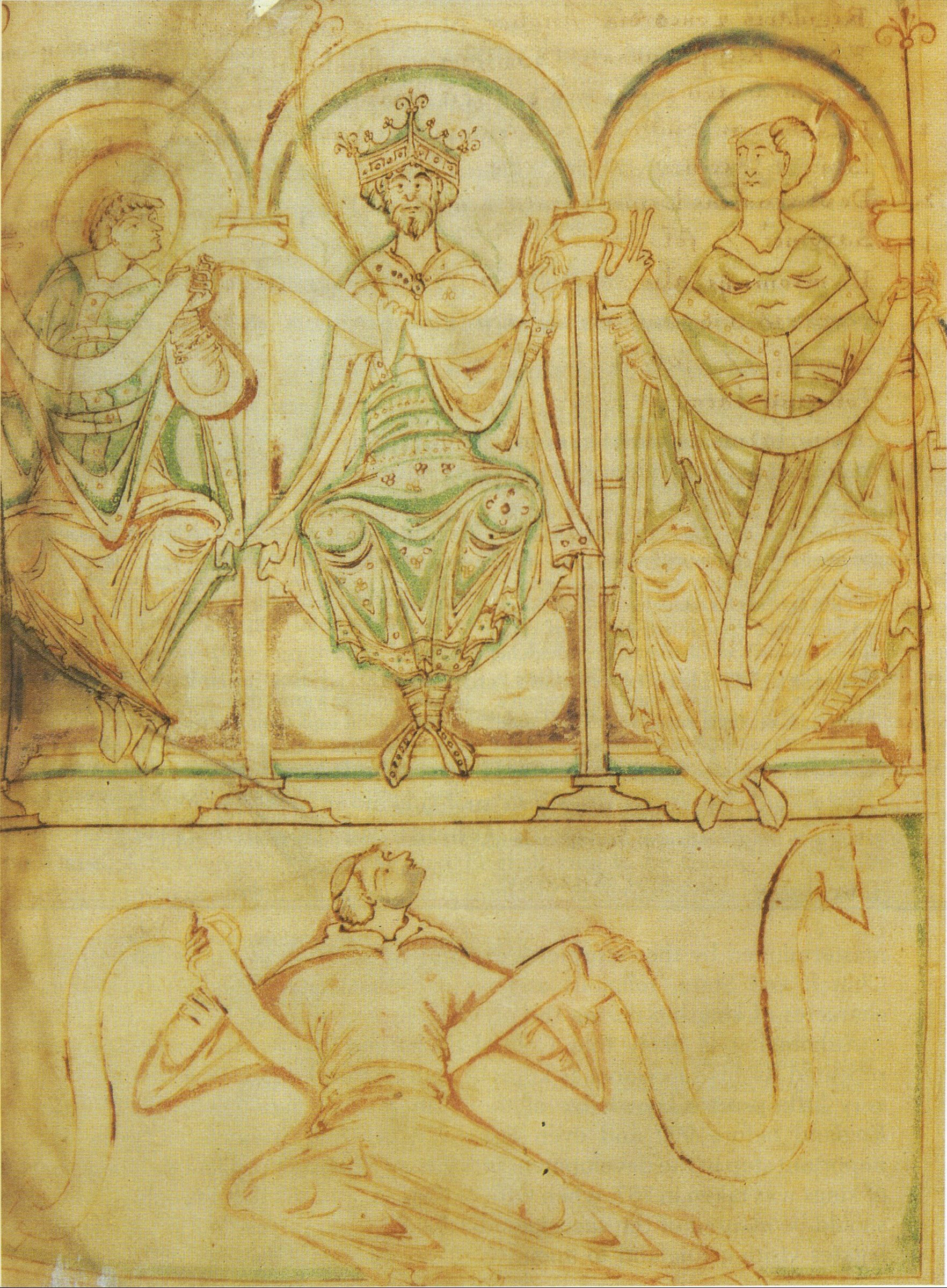
11th century Anglo-Saxon miniature

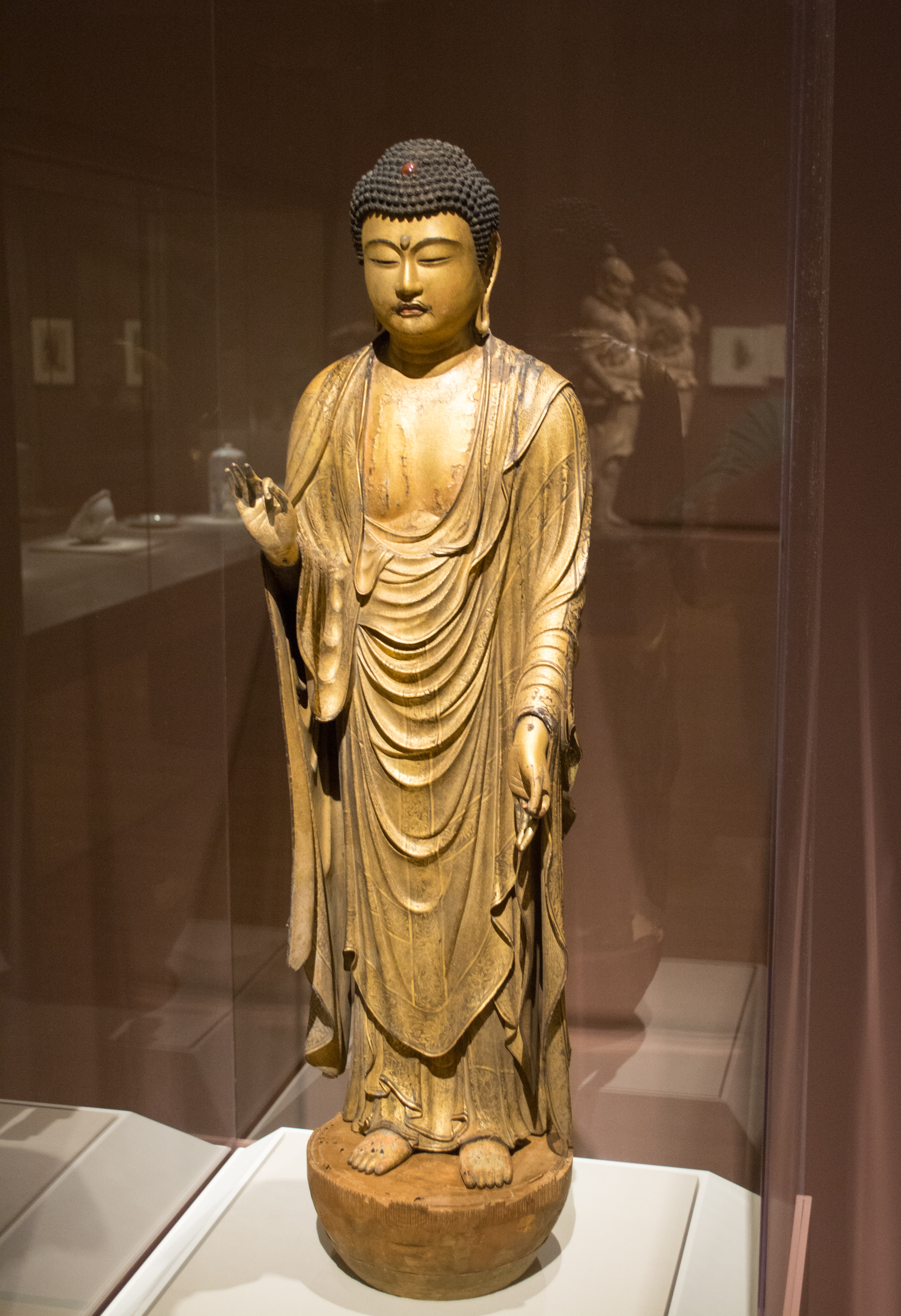
Buddha, Japan, 1269 AD

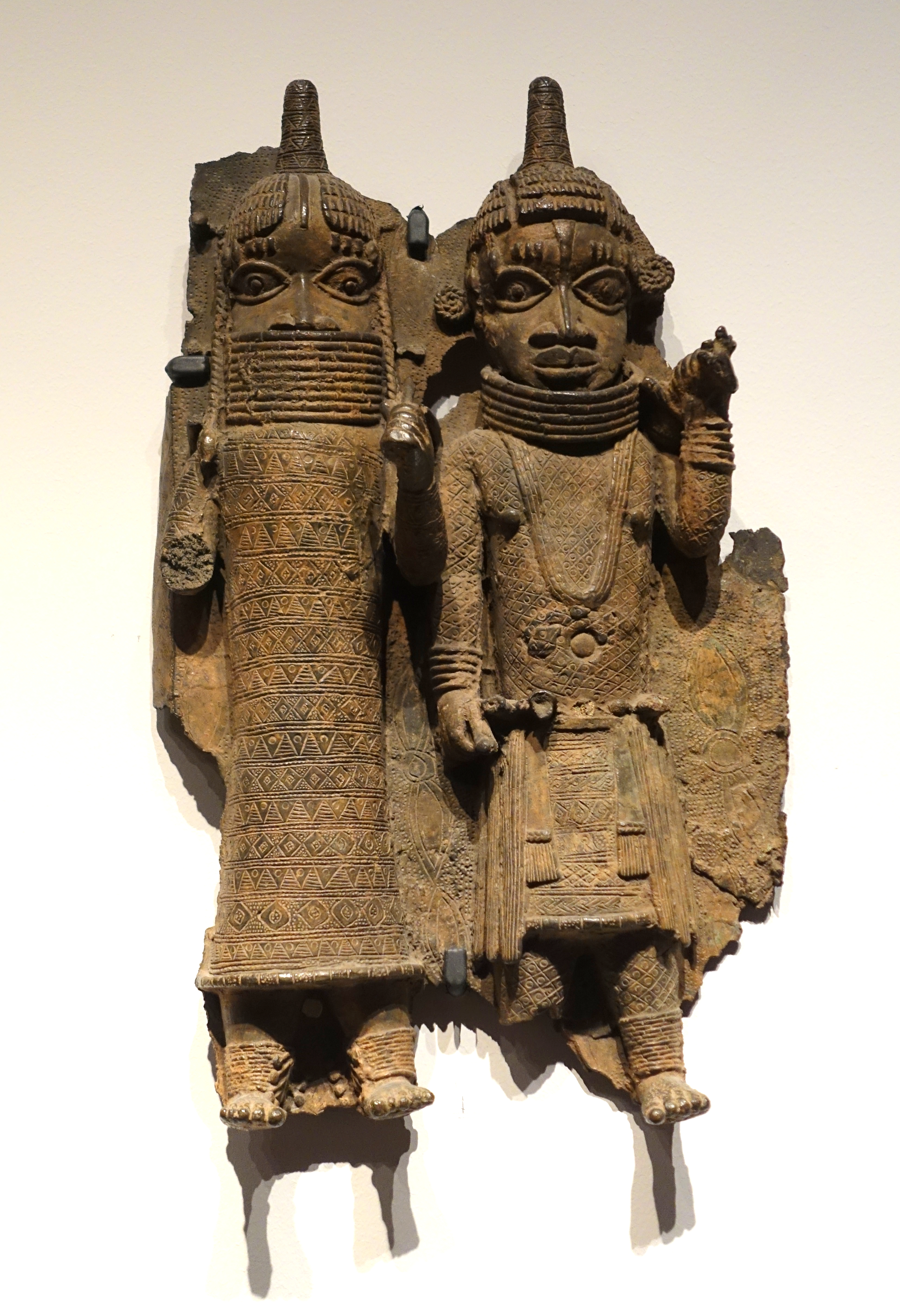
Benin Bronze, 1500-1600

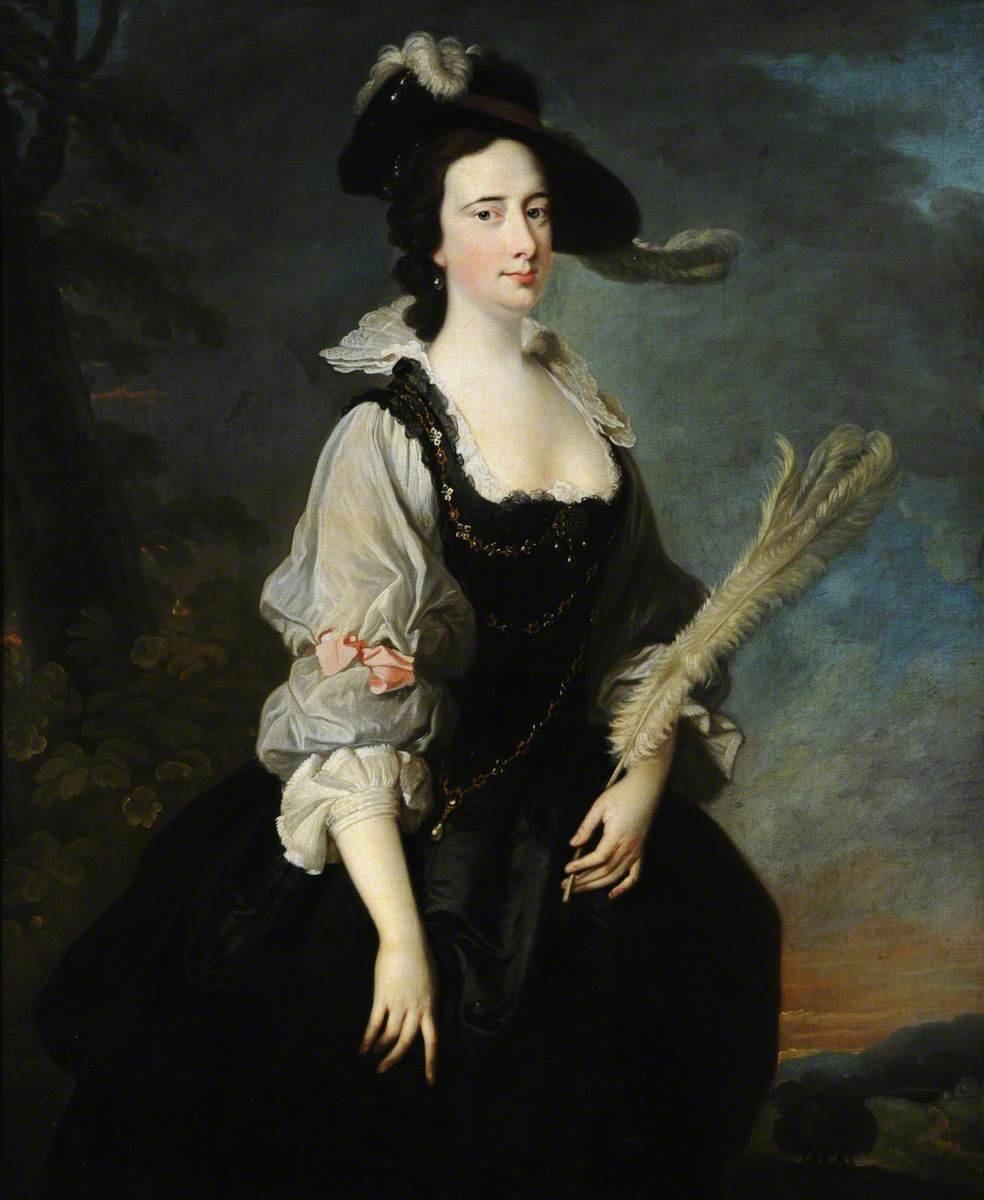
Portrait of Lady Lucy Manners by Thomas Hudson, drapery by Joseph van Aken

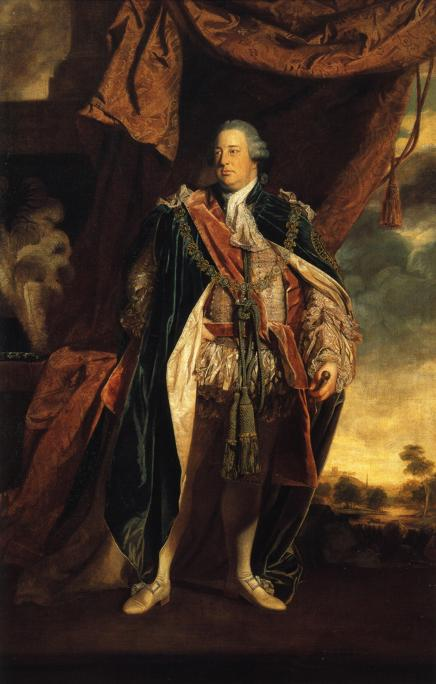
Prince William, Duke of Cumberland, 1721-1765

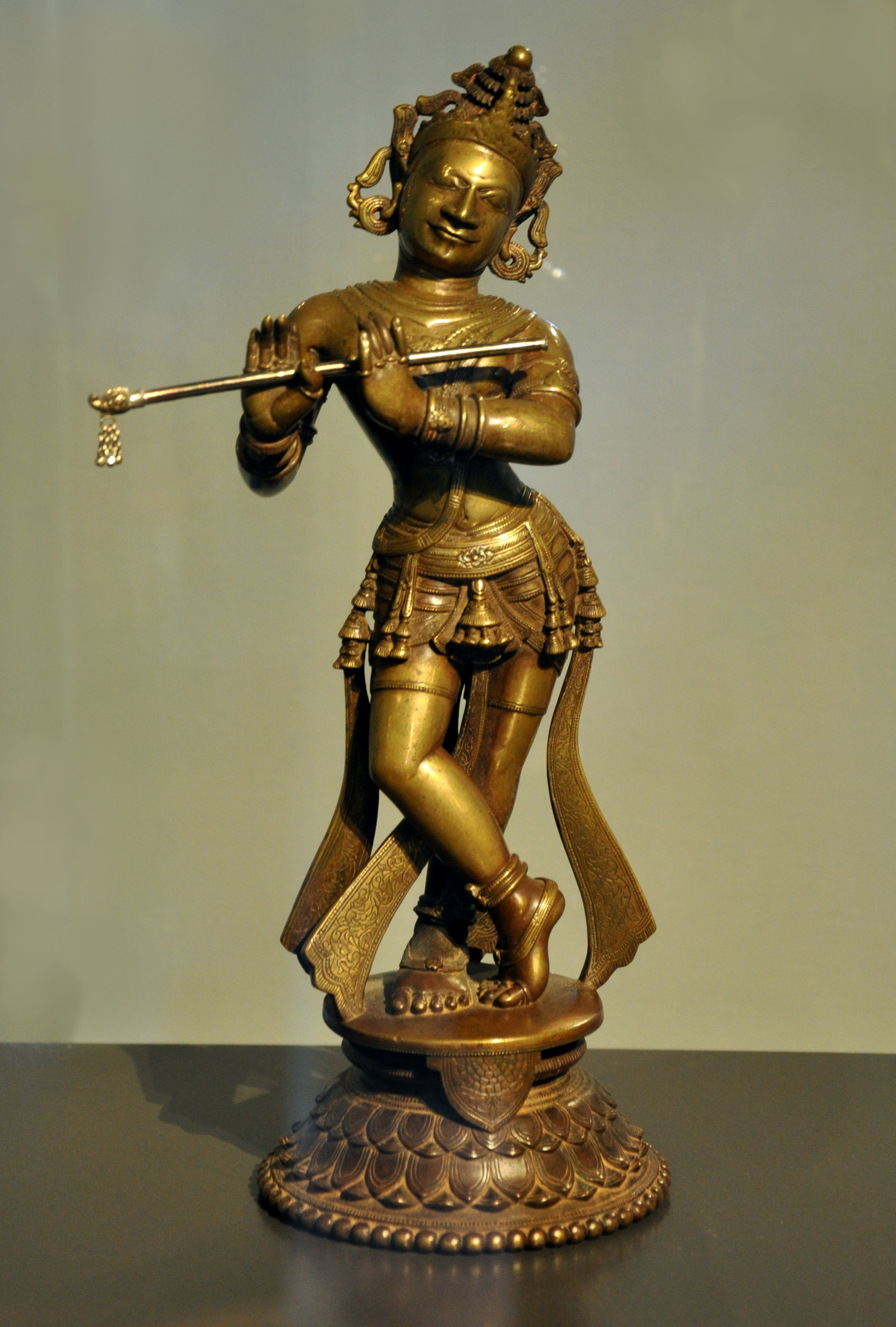
Krishna dancing and playing the flute, Orissa, India, ~1800 AD

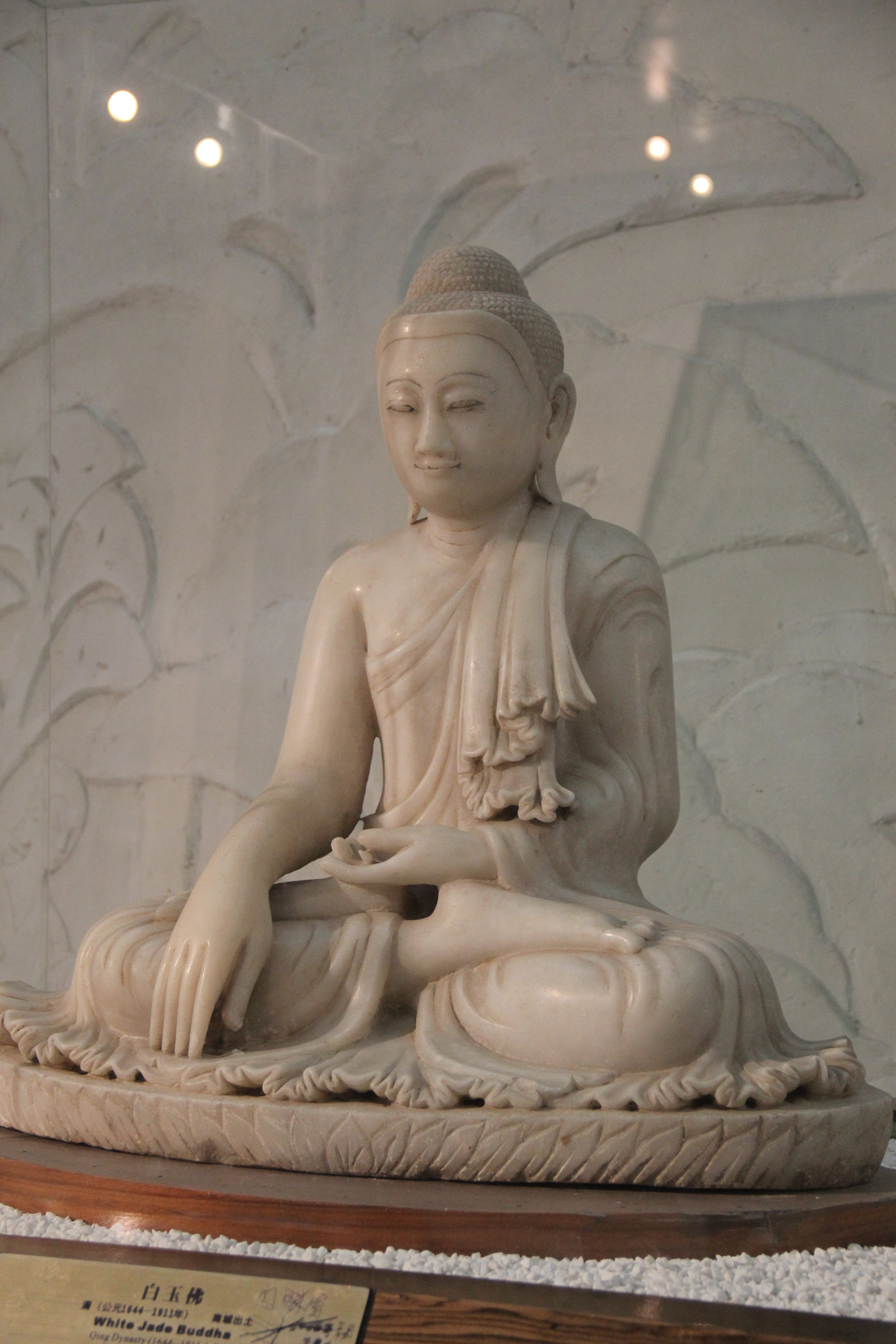
Buddha, Qing dynasty

== See also ==
- Master of the Drapery Studies
