= Svend Lomholt =

Danish dermatologist and veterinarian (1888–1949)

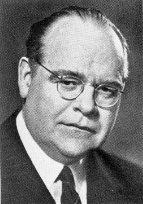

Svend Lomholt (18 October 1888 – 17 July 1949) was a Danish veterinarian and dermatologist.

He published a number of journals of his works, in 1924, he published a report at The University Institute for Theoretical Physics and Pathological Institute, Municipal Hospital, in Copenhagen about the metal composition in rodents and other creatures.

== Family ==
He was married to Marie Kirstine Siegumfeldt until her death in 1920.

His daughter Kirsten Auken (1913-1968) was a Danish politician as are his grandchildren Margrete Auken and Svend Auken
