= Venguessone Nathan =

French-Jewish moneylender and merchant

Venguessone Nathan (d. after 1424) was a French-Jewish moneylender and merchant.

She was a member of a prosperous Provençal family. She was active both as a merchant and a moneylender. She sold draperies and dishes of wood, earthenware and glass. In 1424, she was the largest possessor of property in Arles, and owned at least one vineyard. She was learned, and owned books in both Hebrew and Latin. She is known through her famous will, in which both her possessions and wealth as well as her business activities can be traced.
