= Hauke =

Hauke, pronounced [ˈhɔukə], is a fairly common Frisian masculine given name. According to onomatologist Rienk de Haan, this name developed from a reduced form of Germanic names starting with either Habuk- (meaning "hawk") or with Hug- (meaning "brain").

In the West Frisian language, masculine given names can usually be adapted to equivalent feminine given names. In the case of Hauke, this is accomplished by dropping the voiceless final syllable and adding a diminutive suffix in its place (in this case -je), resulting in Haukje. This is a reasonably common name in the Dutch province of Friesland, though often spelled Houkje, as Hauke is often spelled Houke there.

== People with the name Hauke ==
Some notable people with this name are:

=== Given name ===
- Hauke Fuhlbrügge, former German runner
- Hauke Harder, German composer and experimental physicist
- Hauke Harms, founding member of the German band Girls Under Glass
- Hauke Jagau, German politician
- Hauke Wahl (born 1994), German footballer

Fictional characters

- Hauke Haien, fictional character in Theodor Storm's novella The Rider on the White Horse

=== Surname ===
- The German and later Polish Hauke-Bosak family
  - Friedrich Karl Emanuel Hauke (1737–1810), German-Polish academic
  - Hans Moritz Hauke (1775–1830), Polish general
  - Józef Hauke-Bosak (1834–1871), Polish general
  - John Maurice Hauke (1775–1830), Polish general
  - Julia Hauke (Julia, Princess of Battenberg, 1825–1895), daughter of John Maurice, wife of Prince Alexander of Hesse and by Rhine
  - César Mange de Hauke (1900–1965), controversial French art dealer
- Franzisca Hauke (born 1989), German field hockey player
- Frieda Hauke (1890–1972), German politician
- Gaby Hoffmann (songwriter) (née Hauke), German musician
- Max Hauke (born 1992), Austrian cross-country skier
- Richard L. Hauke (1930–2001), American botanist
- Tobias Hauke (born 1987), German field hockey player

== See also ==
- Auke (name)
