= Van Aken =

Van Aken is a Dutch surname meaning "from Aachen ". It may refer to:

- Hans van Aken (1552–1615), German painter
- Hans Vanaken (born 1992), Belgian footballer
- Hein van Aken, Flemish 13th-century priest
- Jan van Aken (painter) (1614–1661), Dutch painter and engraver
- Jan van Aken (born 1961), German politician
- Jeroen van Aken birth name of Hieronymus Bosch (c.1450–1516), Netherlandish painter
- Joost van Aken (born 1994), Dutch footballer
- Joseph Van Aken (c. 1699 – 1749), Flemish painter
- Sam van Aken, American academic, creator of Tree of 40 Fruit
- Sebastiaen van Aken (1648–1722), Flemish painter
- William R. Van Aken (1912–1993), American lawyer
