= Auke (name) =

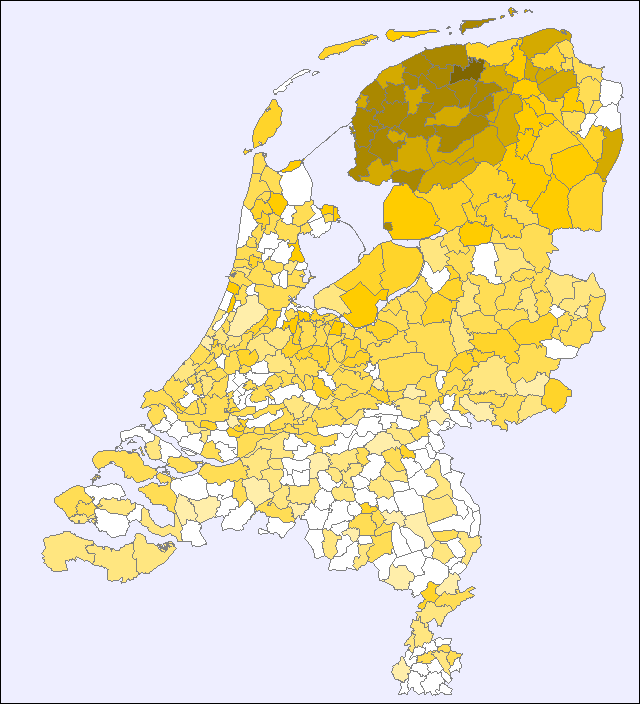
Distribution of the name Auke in the Netherlands, 2018

Auke, pron. [ˈaukə], is a quite common West Frisian masculine given name. It seems to have been a diminutive form originally (-ke is one of the most common diminutive suffices in West Frisian), which developed from the historic form Auwe or Auwen. According to onomatologist Rienk de Haan, Auwe was a very reduced form of certain Germanic names, possibly starting with Alf- (meaning "elf", "supernatural" or "nature spirit").

In West Frisian, masculine given names can usually be adapted to equivalent feminine given names. In the case of Auke, this is accomplished by dropping the voiceless final syllable and adding a diminutive suffix in its place (in this case -je), resulting in Aukje. This is a very common feminine given name in Friesland.

== People named Auke ==
Notable people with the name Auke include:

- Auke Adema (1907–1976), a Dutch skater and winner of the Elfstedentocht
- Auke Bloembergen (1927–2016), a Dutch jurist and legal scholar
- Auke Hulst (born 1975), a Dutch writer and musician
- Auke Stellingwerf (1635–1665), a Dutch (Frisian) admiral
- Auke Tellegen (1930–2024), an American psychologist
- Auke Zijlstra (born 1964), a Dutch politician

== People named Aukje ==
Notable people with the name Aukje include:

- Aukje de Vries (born 1964), a Dutch (Frisian) politician

== See also ==
- Auken
- Hauke
