= George Knapton =

English painter (1698–1778)

George Knapton (1698 – December 1778) was an English portrait painter who specialised in portrait painting. He was the first portraitist for the Society of Dilettanti in the 1740s, and served as Surveyor and Keeper of the King's Pictures from 1765 to 1778.

== Life and work ==
Knapton was born in Christchurch, Hampshire, the son of William Knapton Esquire of Brockenhurst, Hampshire. He studied art under Jonathan Richardson, then at the St Martin's Lane Academy. He spent some years in Italy where he became known as a sound judge of the works of the Old Masters. An account of his visit to Herculaneum was published in the "Philosophical Transactions" of 1740 (no. 458).

Knapton was an original member of the "Society of Dilettanti" and their first portrait artist. He painted many members of the society – mostly in fancy dress – including the Duke of Dorset, Viscount Galway, Sir Francis Dashwood, the Earl of Holdernesse, Earl of Bessborough and Sir Bourchier Wray. Knapton resigned his position at the society in 1763.

In 1750, the then Prince of Wales commissioned Knapton, together with George Vertue, to produce a catalogue of the pictures at Kensington Palace, Hampton Court and Windsor Castle. In 1765, he succeeded Stephen Slaughter as Surveyor and Keeper of the King's Pictures; he was also in charge of Lord Spencer's collection at Althorp, Northamptonshire.

Knapton's largest painting was that of The Family of Frederick, Prince of Wales (1751, Royal Collection). He also painted portraits of the Earl of Upper Ossory (with his brother and sister), the Earl of Burlington, Admiral Sir John Norris, Francis, Fifth Duke of Leeds, Admiral George Vandeput, Archibald Bower, Nicolas Tindal, Smart Lethieullier, Hildebrand Jacob, Admiral Edward Hawke, and the singers Carestini and Lisabetta du Parc. For his portraits, he employed the specialist drapery painter Joseph Van Aken to paint the dresses and costumes of his sitters.

Knapton assisted his brothers John and Paul, who had succeeded to and extended their father's book publishing business in London in the production of several publications including works by Thomas Birch and The History of England by Nicolas Tindal and Paul de Rapin. Knapton died in Kensington in December 1778 and was buried there on the 28th of that same month. Knapton's brother, Charles Knapton, born in Christchurch, Hampshire (1700–1760), was also an artist and, together with Arthur Pond (1705?–1758), published a book Imitations of the Italian Masters (1735), which contained many engravings by himself, mainly of works by Guercino.

== Gallery ==
The Reverend Nicolas Tindal (c. 1726)

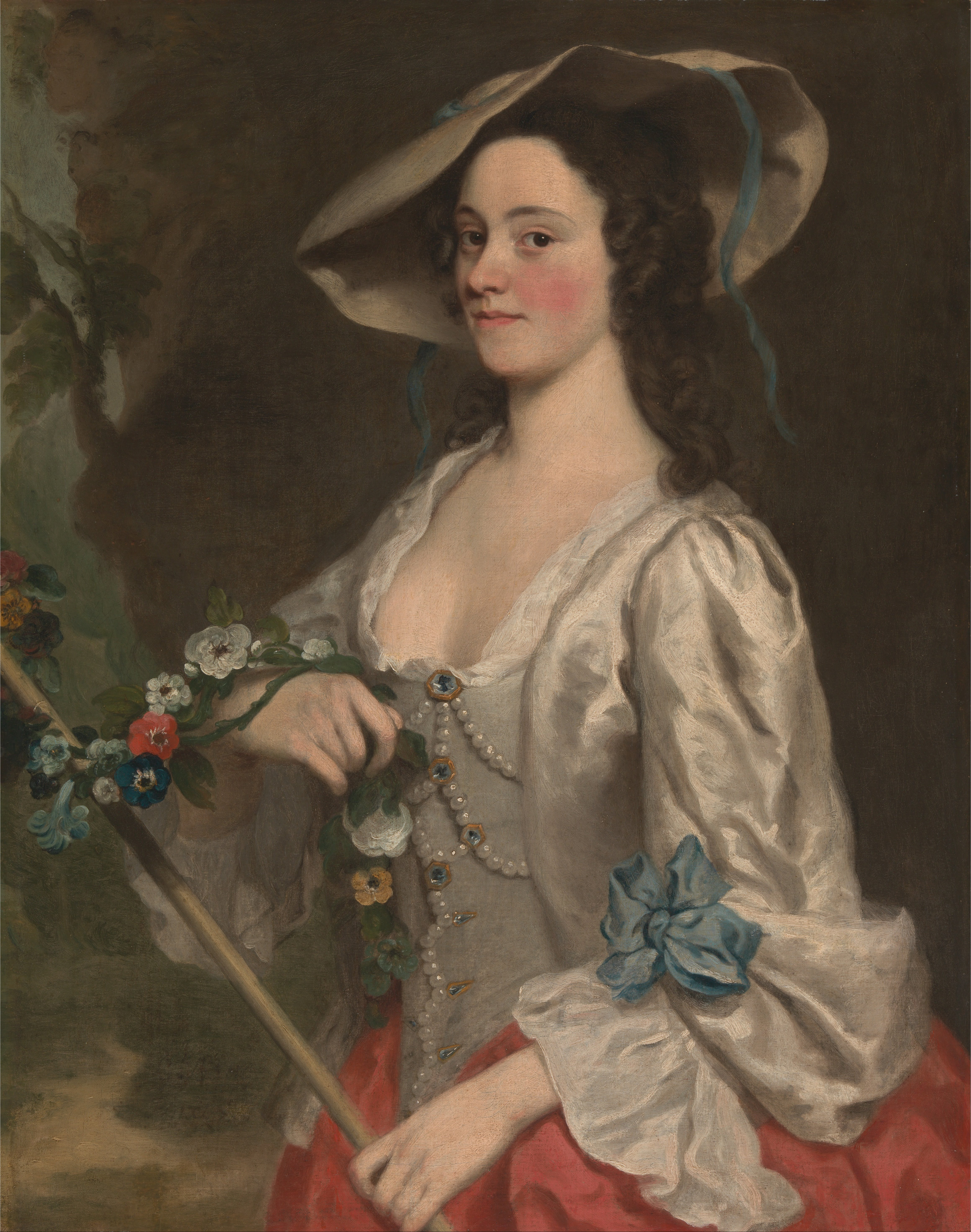
Portrait of a Woman (1735–1745)

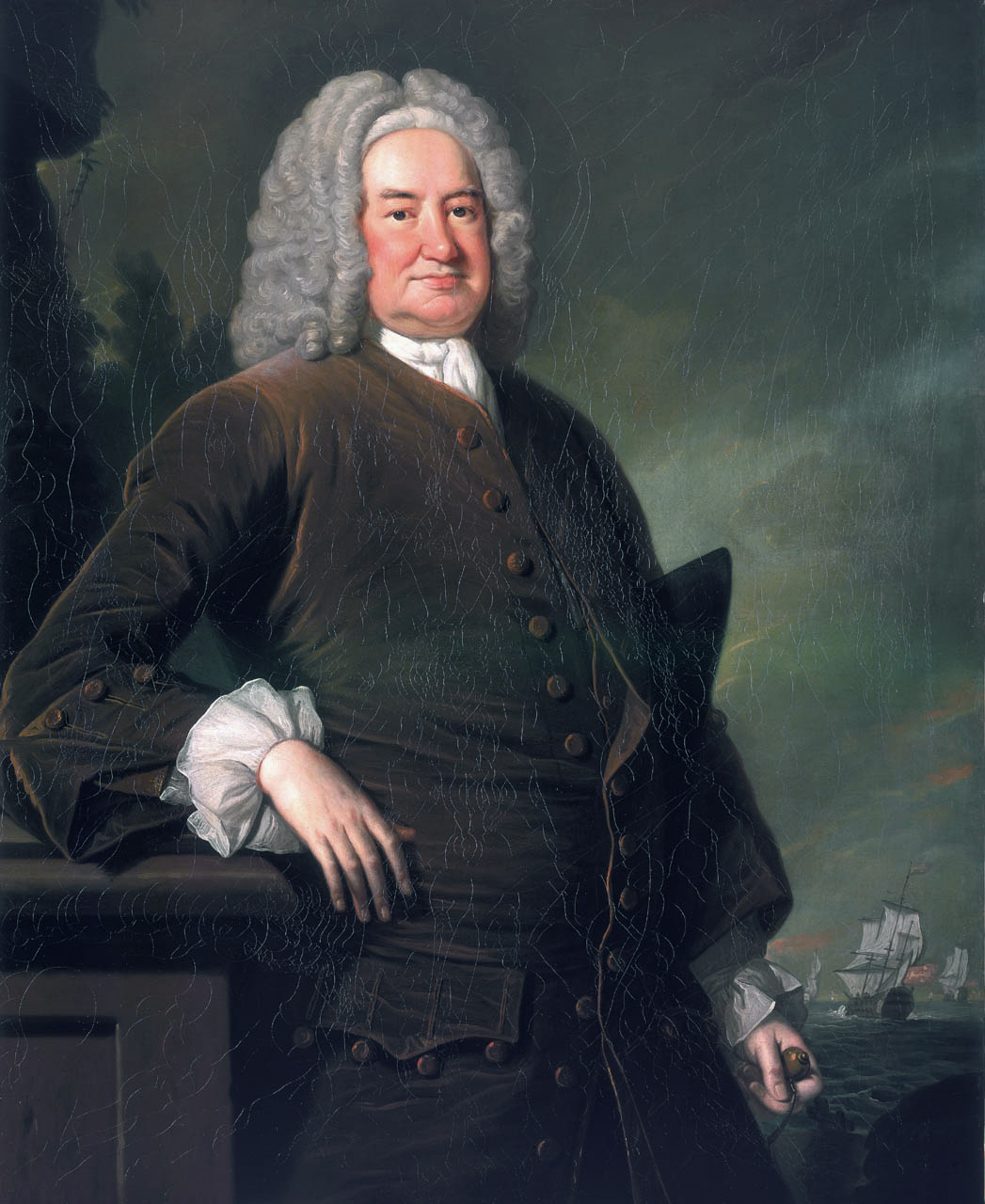
Admiral Sir John Norris (c. 1735)

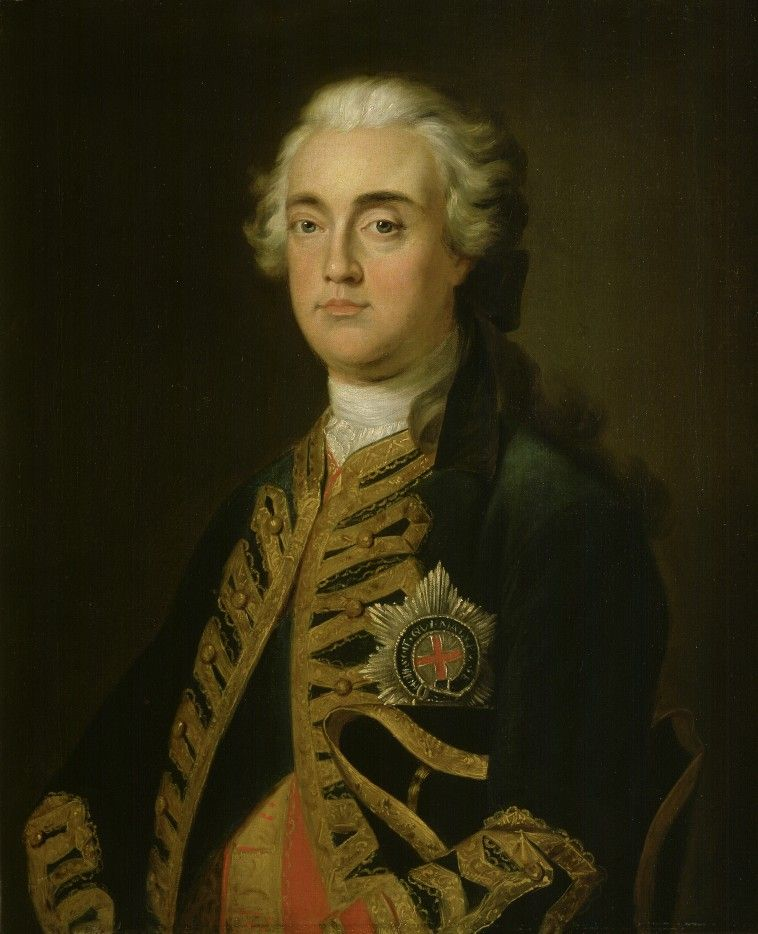
William Capell, 3rd Earl of Essex (1735)

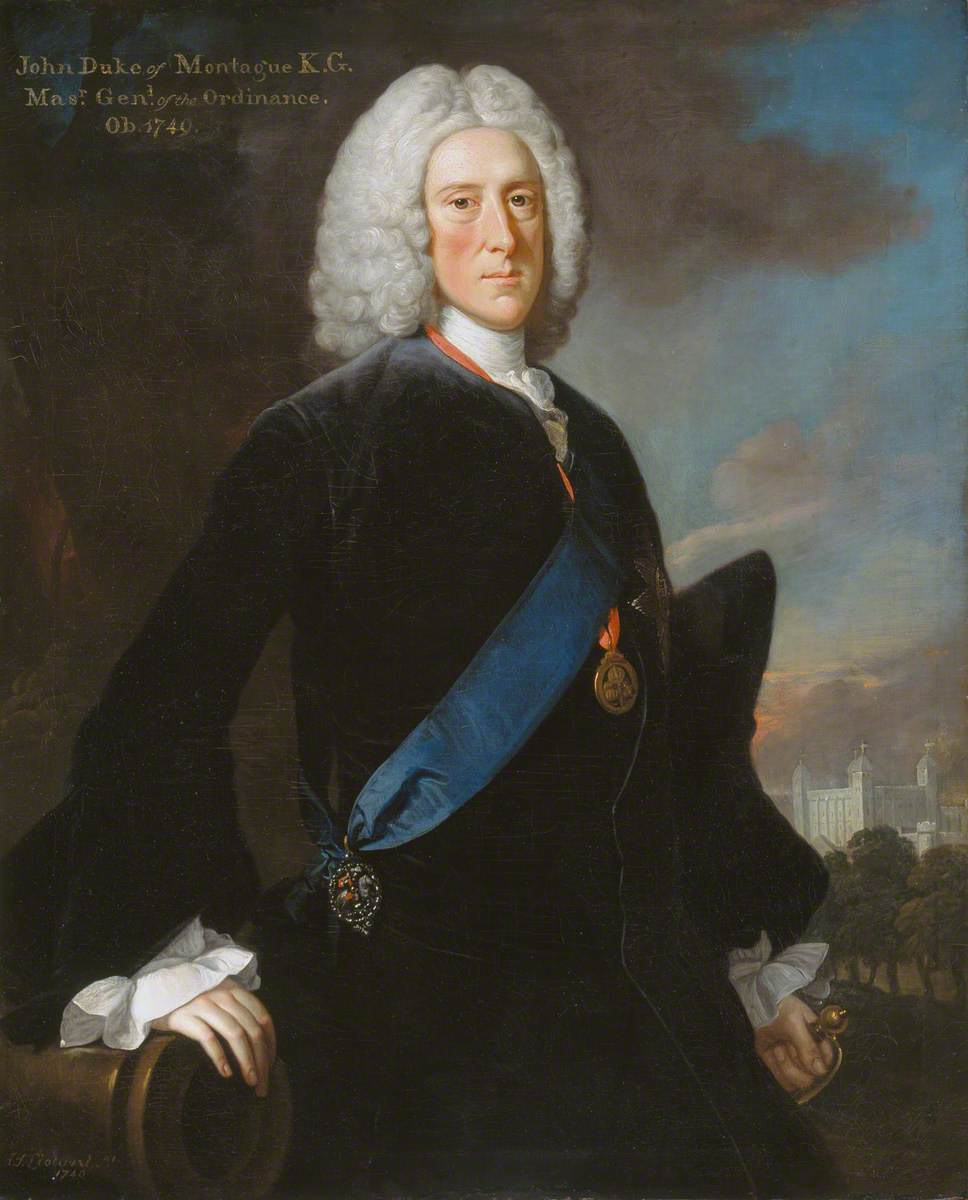
John Montagu, 2nd Duke of Montagu (1740)

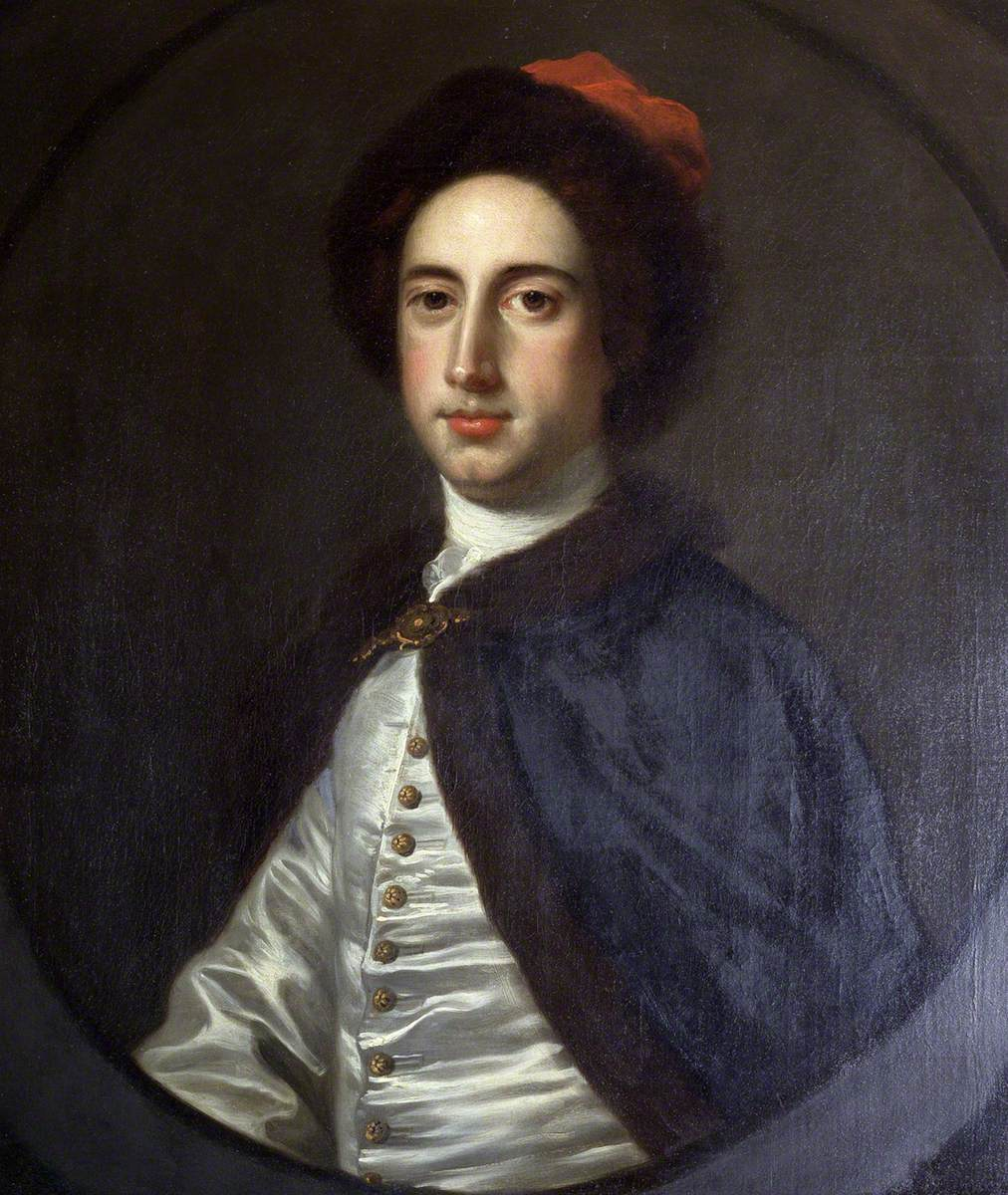
William Wentworth, 2nd Earl of Strafford (1740)

Captain Richard Chadwick (1744)

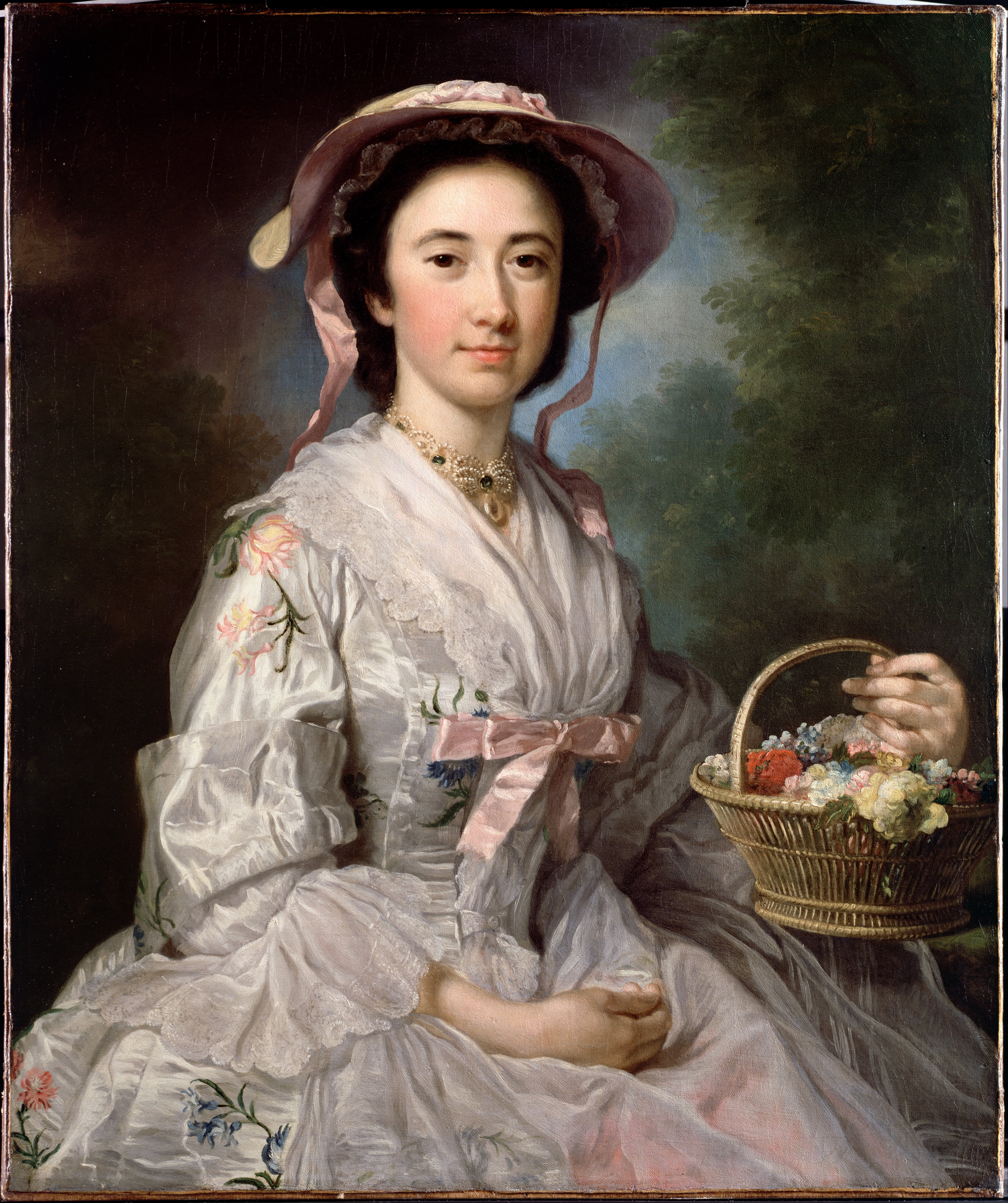
Lucy Ebberton (c. 1745)

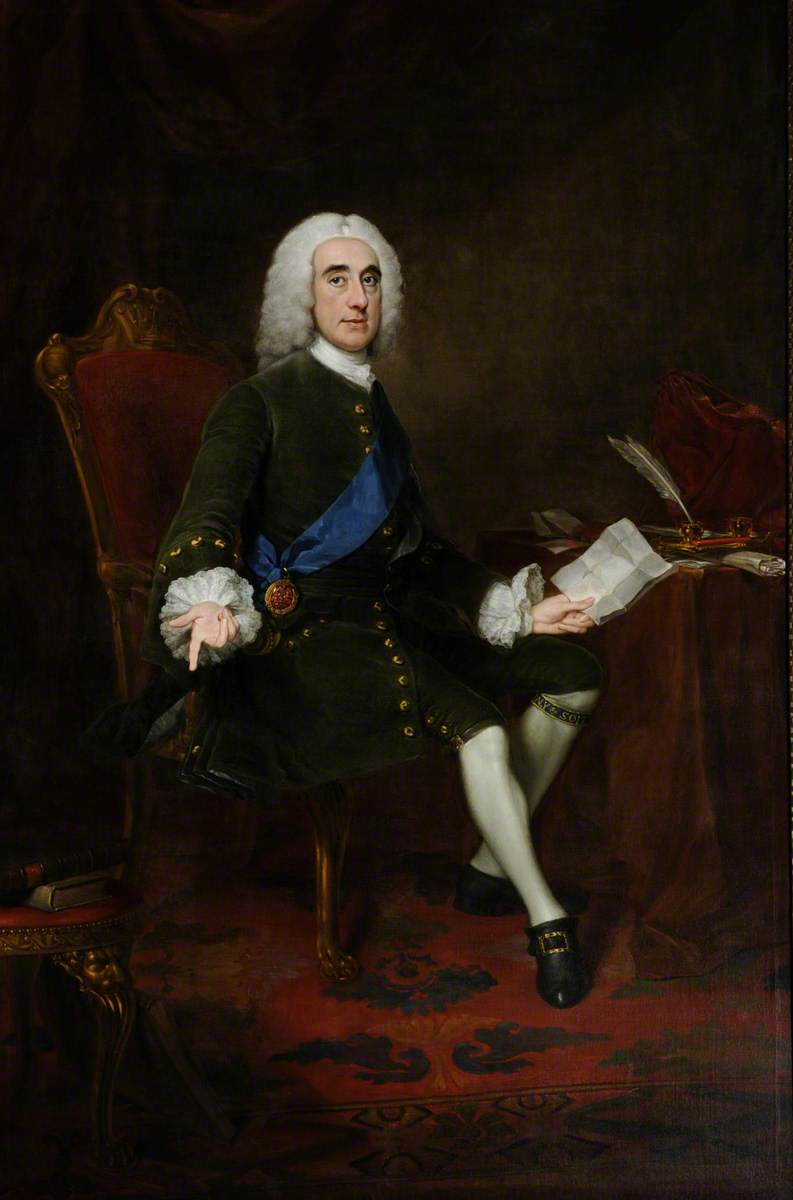
Philip Stanhope, 4th Earl of Chesterfield (c. 1745)

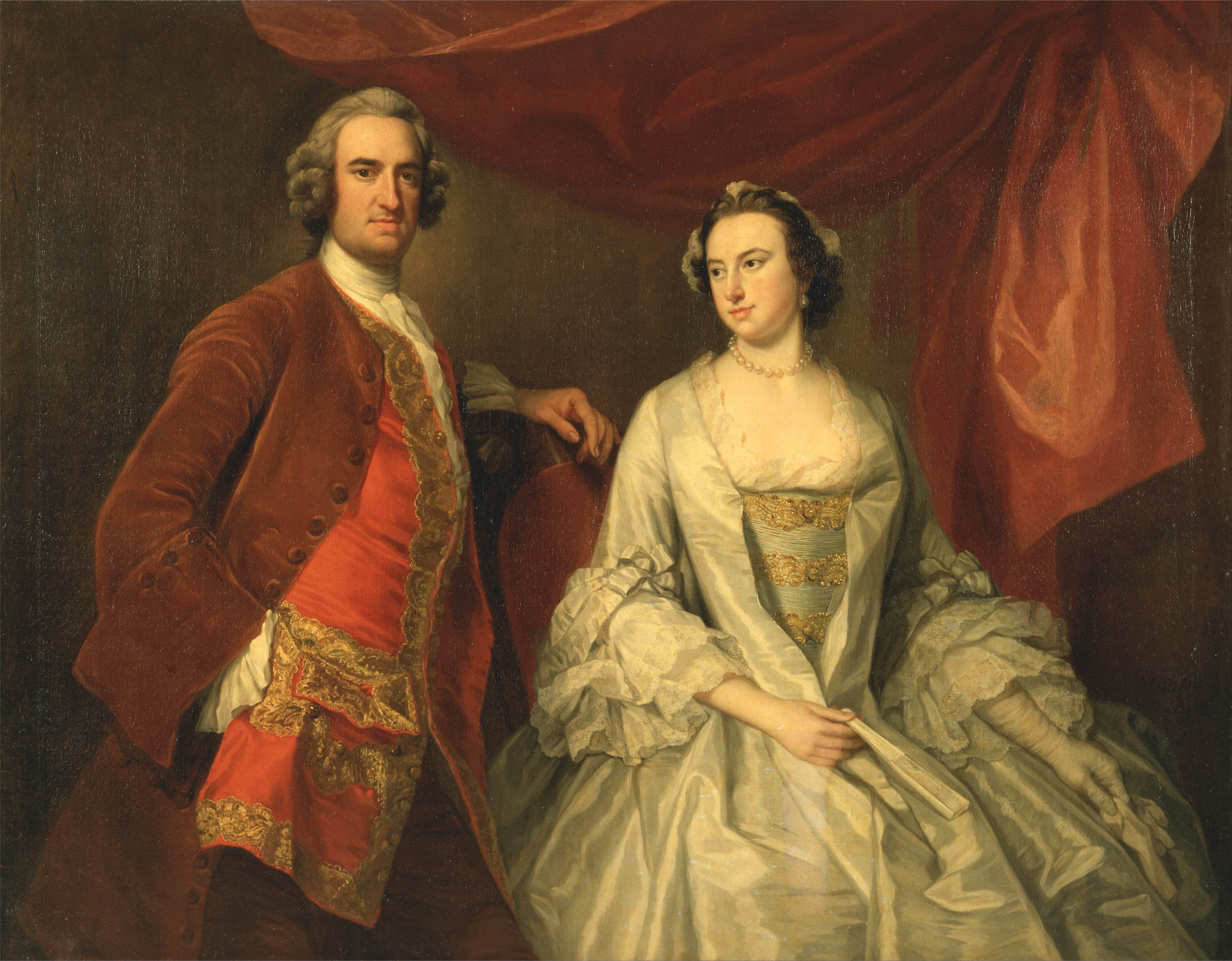
A Man and a Woman, Possibly of the Missing Family, of Little Park House, Wickham, Hampshire (1747)

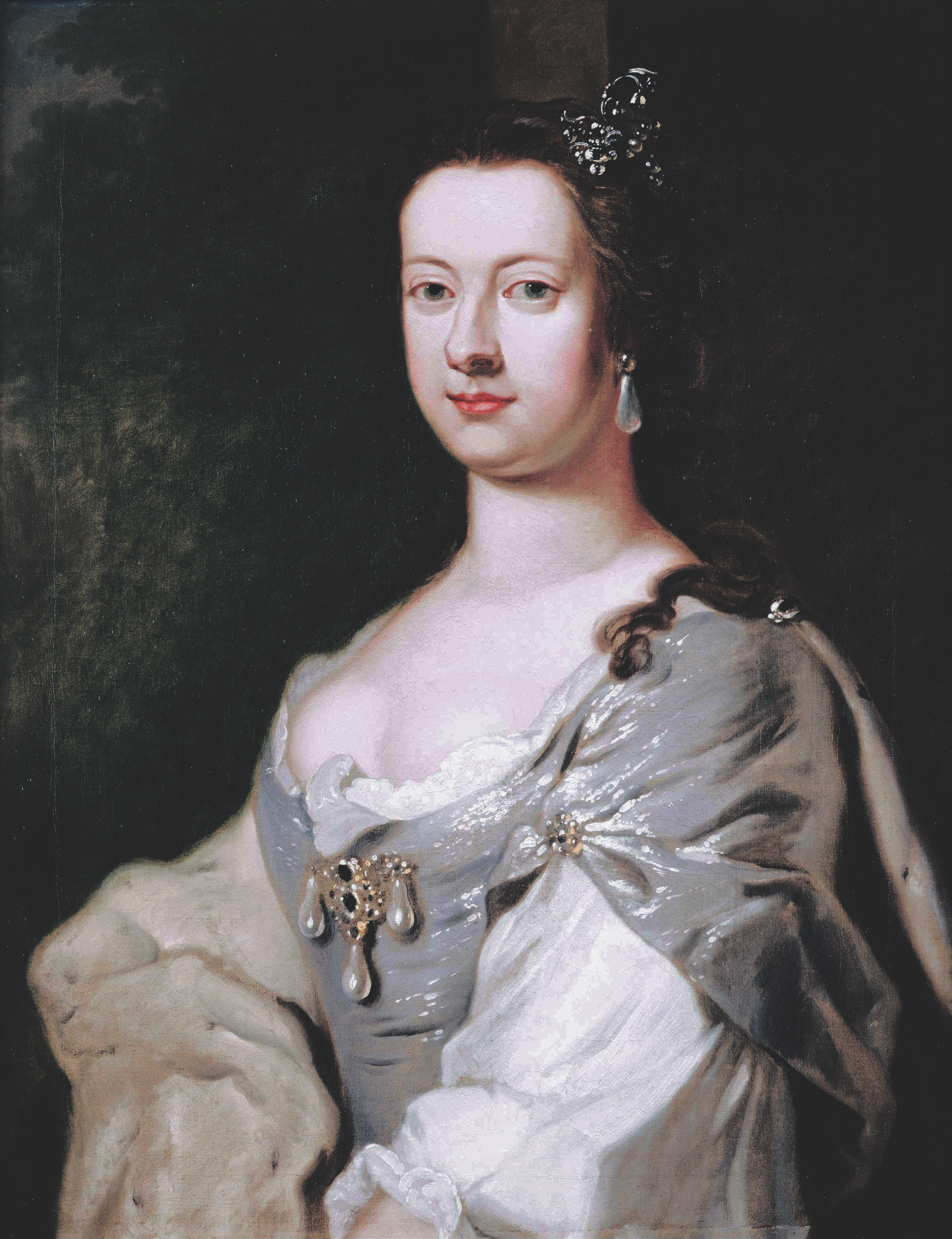
Charlotte Boyle (c. 1748)

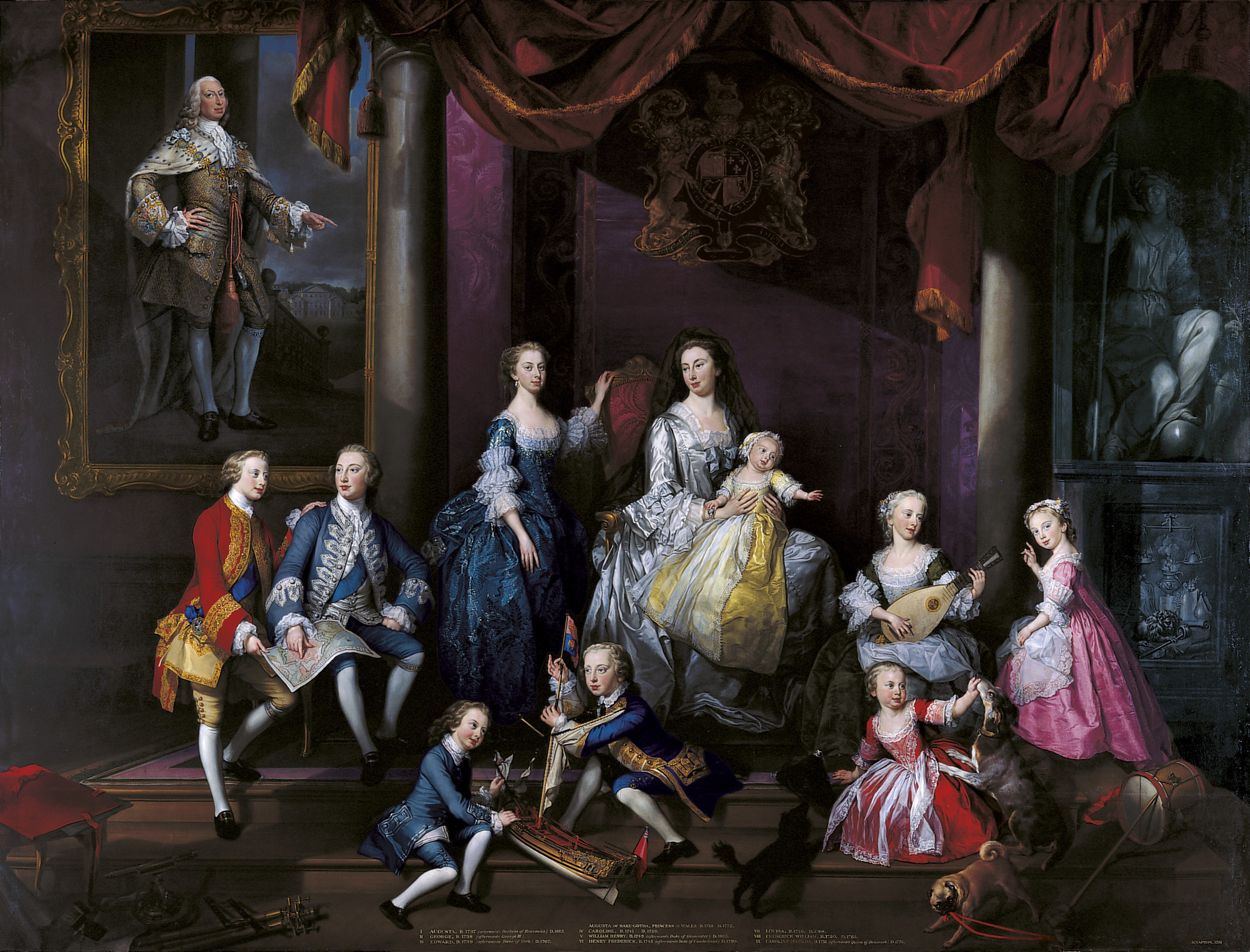
The Family of Frederick, Prince of Wales (1751)

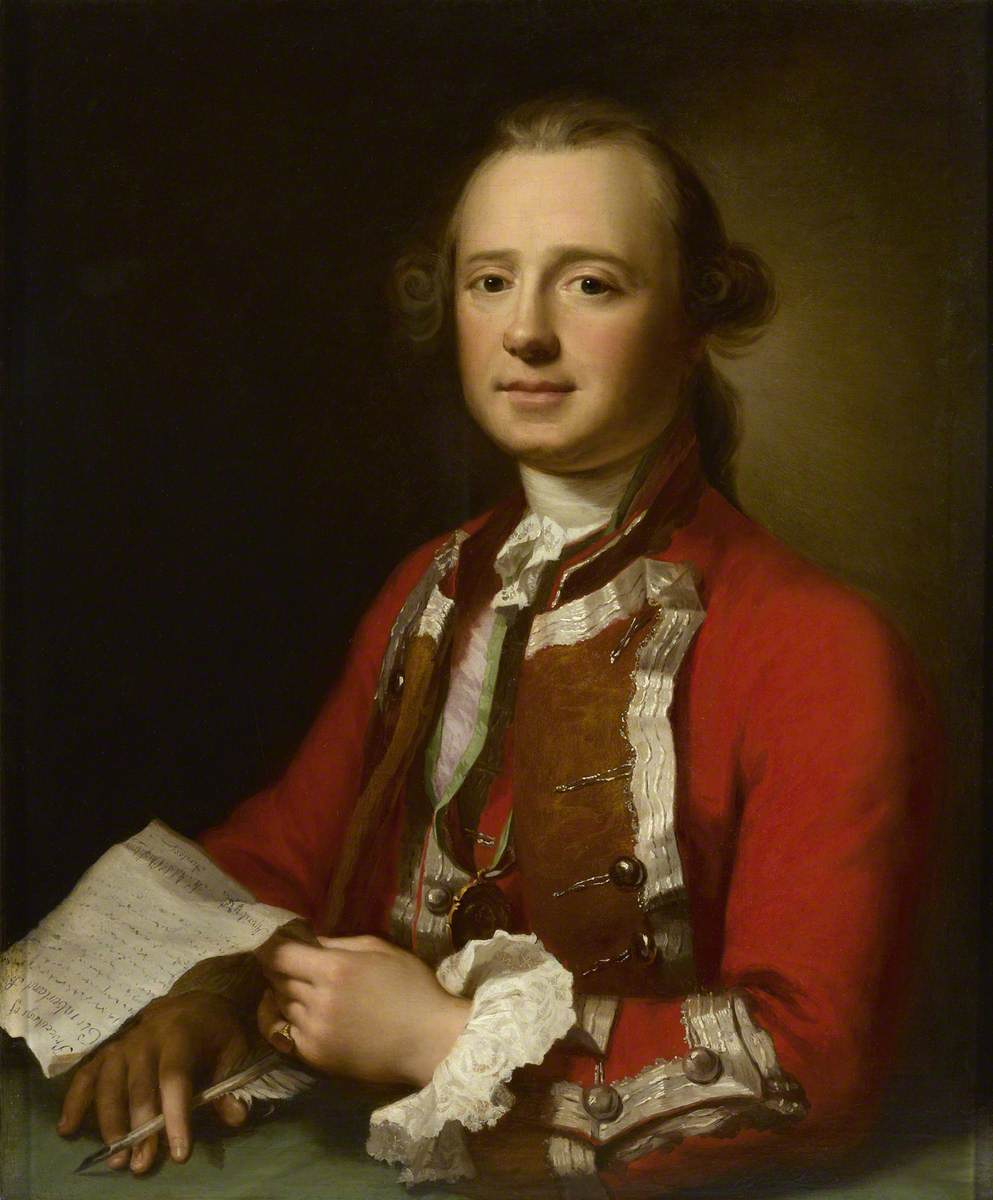
Sir James Adolphus Oughton (c. 1753)

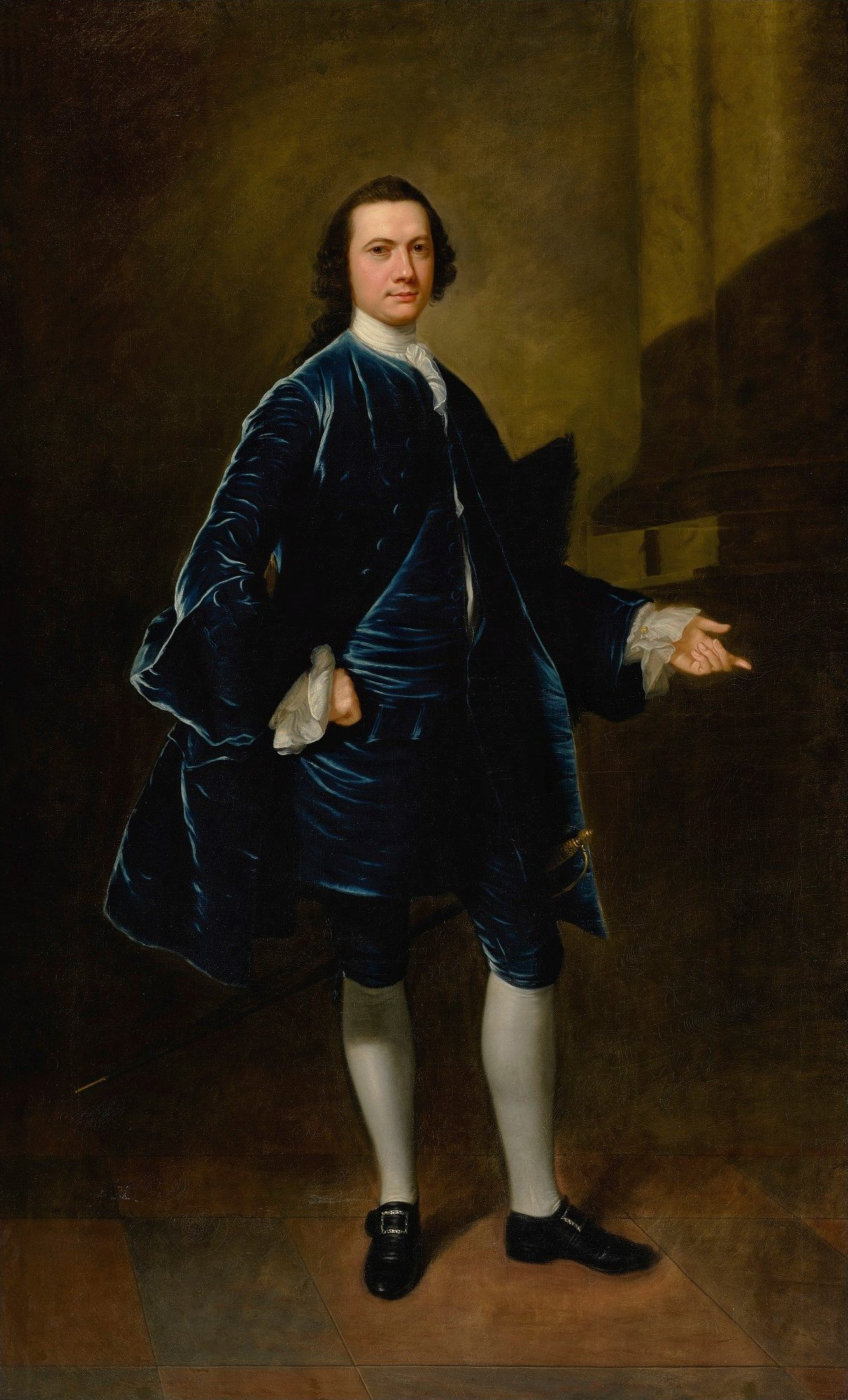
George Pigot, 1st Baron Pigot (Date unknown)
