= Richard L. Hauke =

Richard L. Hauke (1930-2017) was for many years a Professor of Botany at the University of Rhode Island in Kingston, Rhode Island. He was considered one of the world's leading experts on the plants known as horsetails (Equisetum spp.)

Born in Detroit, Michigan in 1930.

B.S. in Biological Sciences, University of Michigan, Ann Arbor, 1952

M.S. in Botany, University of California, Berkeley, 1954

PhD in Botany, University of Michigan, Ann Arbor, 1960

Professor at University of Rhode Island, Kingston, 1959-1989

sabbaticals in Costa Rica, Jordan and Kenya

After Hauke's retirement, his plant specimens were donated to the Herbarium at the New York Botanical Garden. Most of his professional papers have been donated to the University of Rhode Island Library.
