= Drapery painter =

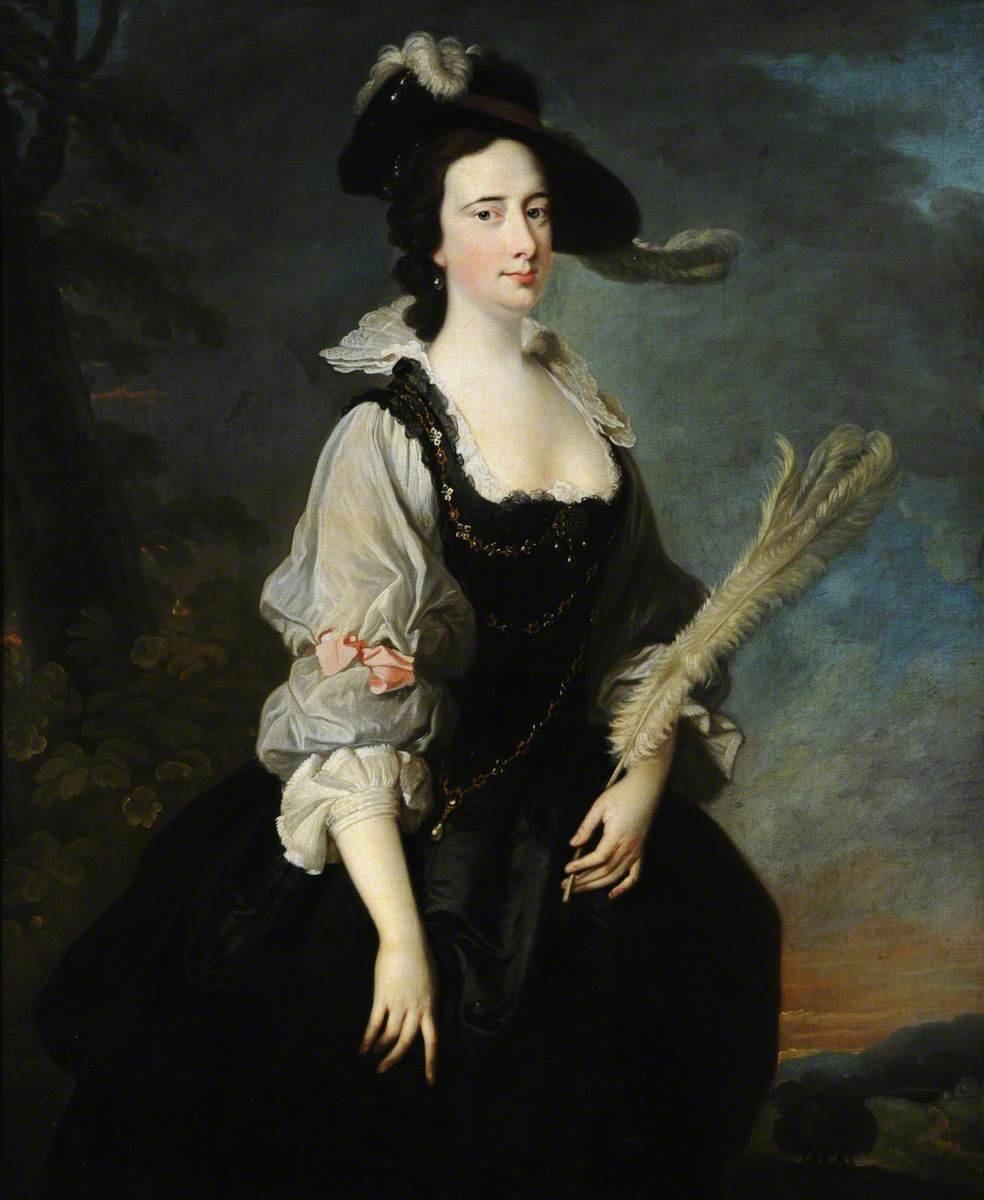
Lady Lucy Manners, Duchess of Montrose, by Thomas Hudson, drapery by Joseph Van Aken

A drapery painter refers to a specialist painter commissioned to complete the dress, costumes and other accessories worn by the subjects of portrait paintings. They were employed by portrait painters with a large workshop in 18th century England. While the portraitist completed the face and hands, the drapery painter was responsible for the pose and costume. The specialists were not necessarily assistants in the workshop of the portrait painters but rather subcontractors.

== History ==
It is believed that the practice arose in Flemish and Dutch painting practices. Collaborative paintings were a common practice in Antwerp art production. Rubens, for instance, often made collaborative paintings with specialist landscape, still life or animal painters. The use of drapery painters was common for all leading British portraitists of the early and mid-18th century. They typically relied on one or more drapery painters to add the clothes and other accessories to their portraits. Only Hogarth and Gainsborough seem not to have used these specialist painters. The practice gradually disappeared by the end of the 18th century.

== Key figures ==
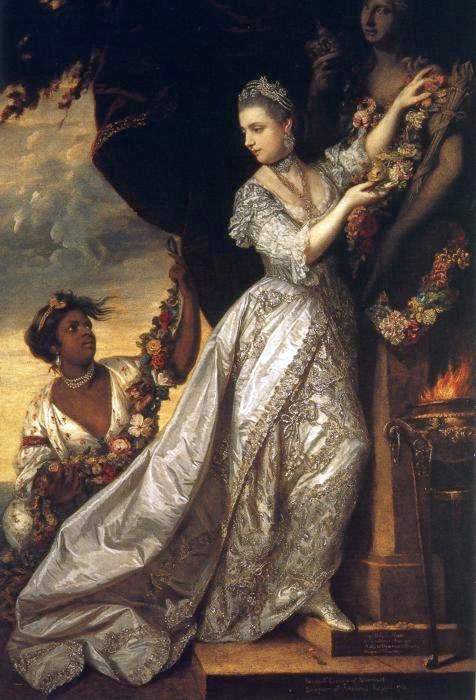
Lady Elizabeth Russell (Keppel) by Joshua Reynolds, drapery by Peter Toms

The best known drapery painter in 18th-century London was the Flemish painter Joseph Van Aken from Antwerp (c.1699–1749). He had settled in London, England around 1720, together with his brothers Arnold and Alexander (known as Alexander van Haecken) who were also painters. He first painted genre scenes and conversation pieces. He and his brother Alexander also hired out their services as drapery painters. From 1635 he worked for many leading portrait painters such as Allan Ramsay, Thomas Hudson, Joseph Highmore and George Knapton as well as lesser figures also outside of London. The portrait painters would send the unfinished pictures to his London studio or painted the head on a separate piece of canvas so it could be pasted onto the costumed figure.

Van Aken's participation in portraits in the 1730s and 1740s is evidenced by a series of drapery studies preserved in the Scottish National Gallery which relate to his collaborations with Hudson and Allan Ramsay. Van Aken's contributions helped popularise the Van Dyck costume amongst patrician sitters in the 1730s. The contributions of Van Aken were highly regarded by contemporaries and George Vertue placed him on the same level as the portrait painters themselves. As Van Aken and his brother worked for a great many portrait painters Vertue observed that 'its very difficult to know one hand from another' (i.e. it was difficult to distinguish which portrait painter was responsible for a particular portrait).

Peter Toms was an English painter who apprenticed with Thomas Hudson. He later became a drapery painter working for Francis Cotes. After Cotes' death, he was employed by Sir Joshua Reynolds, Benjamin West and John Zoffany amongst others. The fact that Toms was a founding member of the Royal Academy in 1768 shows that drapery painters were held in high regard.
