= Van Auken =

Van Auken or Vanauken may refer to:

People

- Bill Van Auken, a presidential candidate in the U.S. election of 2004
- Cornelia Van Auken Chapin (1893–1972), American artist
- Daniel Myers Van Auken (1826–1908), a Democratic member of the U.S. House of Representatives from Pennsylvania
- Sheldon Vanauken (1914–1996), an American author
- Tascha Van Auken, American political organizer and government official

Places

- Van Auken Creek, a tributary of the Lackawaxen River in Pennsylvania

== See also ==
- Auken, a surname
