= Kirsten Auken =

Danish sexologist and politician

Kirsten Auken (25 June 1913 – 21 January 1968) was a Danish sexologist and politician, who was one of the leading proponents of the introduction of sex education in Denmark. She was the mother of politicians Margrete Auken and Svend Auken.

== Biography ==
She was born in Copenhagen to Professor of Dermatology Svend Lomholt (1888–1949) and Marie Kirstine Siegumfeldt Beck (1888–1920) and married physician Gunnar Auken in 1940. They both participated in the Danish resistance movement and were politically active in Danish Unity, and subsequently in the Social Democrats. In 1953 Auken became Dr.Phil. on the "Undersøgelser over unge kvinders sexuelle adfærd" ("Studies on the sexual behaviour of young women").

She died in 1968 of cancer.

== Family ==
- Margrete Auken
- Svend Auken

== Sources ==
- www.kvinfo.dk, om Kirsten Auken
