= Joseph Van Aken =

Flemish painter (c. 1699–1749)

Josef van Aken
- Born: Josef van Aken c. 1699; Antwerp
- Died: July 4, 1749 (aged 49–50); London
- Known for: Drapery painting, genre painting, conversation pieces, portrait painting
- Style: Baroque, Rococo

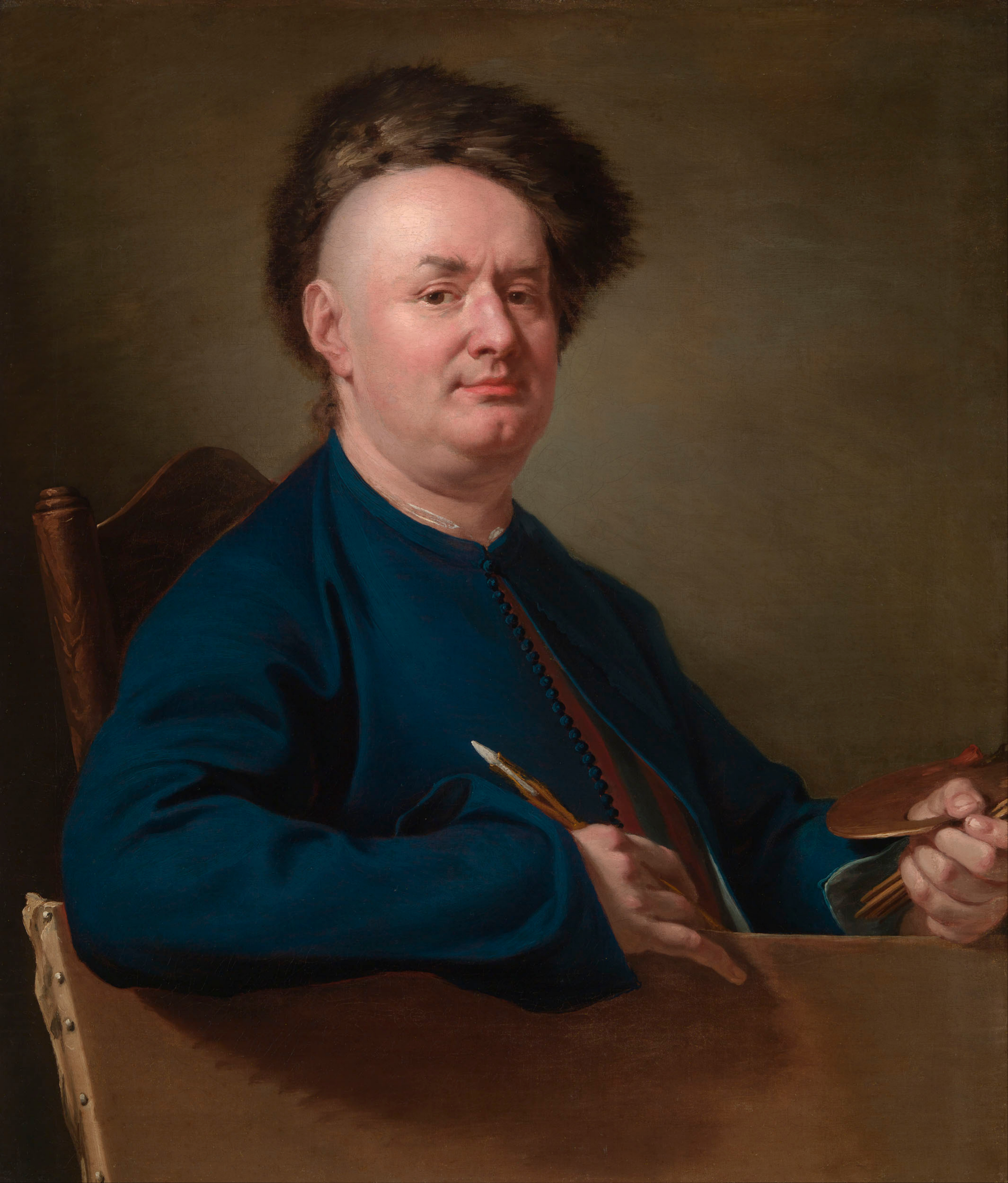
Joseph Van Aken by Thomas Hudson, c. 1745

Josef van Aken, known in England as Joseph van Aken and Joseph Van Aken of Heacken (c. 1699, Antwerp – 4 July 1749 London) was a Flemish genre, portrait and drapery painter who spent most of his career in England. Initially successful in England with his fashionable conversation pieces and other genre scenes, he gradually specialised as a drapery painter. Drapery painters were specialist painters who completed the dress, costumes and other accessories worn by the subjects of portrait paintings. They worked for portrait painters with a large clientele. He was recognised as one of the foremost drapery painters active in mid-18th-century England and was employed in that capacity by many leading and lesser known portrait painters of his time.

== Life ==
Very little is known about the early life of the artist. He is believed to have been born in Antwerp around 1699. There is no record of his training in Antwerp and he was never registered as a pupil or master in the Antwerp Guild of Saint Luke.

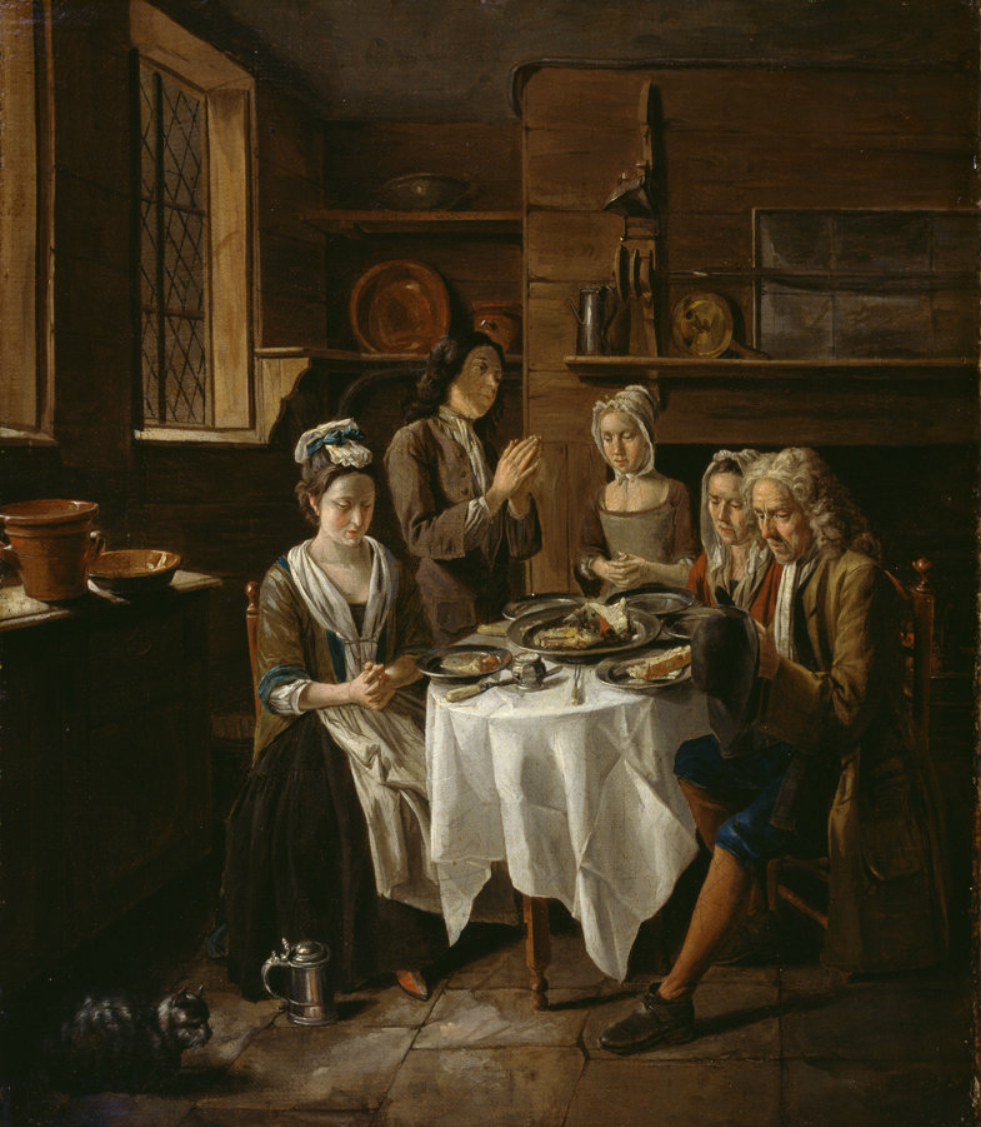
Saying Grace

He arrived in London from Antwerp in around 1720, accompanied by his brother Alexander (1701–57), and possibly also an older brother called Arnoldus (d.1735/6). He initially painted genre scenes and conversation pieces in the Flemish tradition. He used local English scenery in his genre works. He also painted portrait paintings. His works as an independent artist include a view of Covent Garden Market, of which he made at least three versions. He largely abandoned genre painting as an independent artist and became a specialist drapery painter in the mid-1730s.

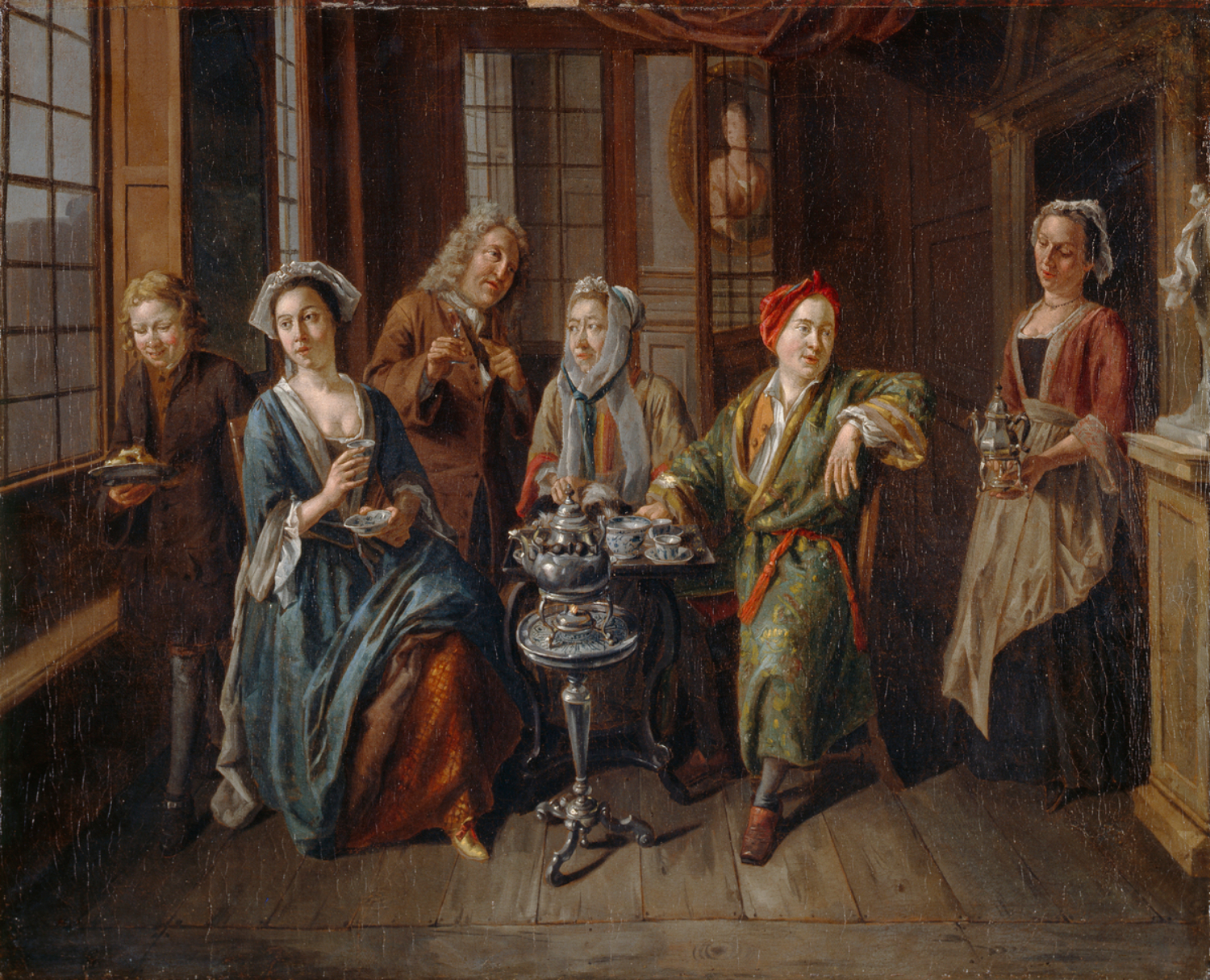
Tea party, 1720s

Van Aken painted drapery for most of the leading artists in London as well as minor artists, also outside of London. Artists by whom he was engaged as drapery painter include Allan Ramsay, Thomas Hudson, Joseph Highmore, Thomas Bardwell and George Knapton. As he was working for many of the leading portrait painters in England, Horace Walpole commented "As in England almost everybody's picture is painted, so almost every painter's work is painted by Vanaken". As he was specialised in painting draperies for portrait painting, he was sometimes called 'the Tailor from Aken' (Aken being the Dutch translation for the German town Aachen).

His reputation was so great and the competition to ensure his services so fierce that when in 1745 the portrait painter John Robinson from Bath sought to engage van Aken as a drapery painter, van Aken's other employers threatened to cease hiring him if he agreed to work for Robinson. The same scenario played out when the portrait painter Jean-Baptiste van Loo made him a similar offer.

Van Aken was a member of the second St. Martin's Lane Academy, an association of artists that gathered in the Slaughter's Coffee House in London between 1635 and 1666. Many artists were members including Hogarth, Francis Hayman and Thomas Hudson. The artists discussed ideas about art in their gatherings. In the 1730s the young John Wollaston likely worked in the workshop of van Aken. In 1748 he travelled to Paris with Hogarth and Francis Hayman, and then from there by himself to the Habsburg Netherlands.

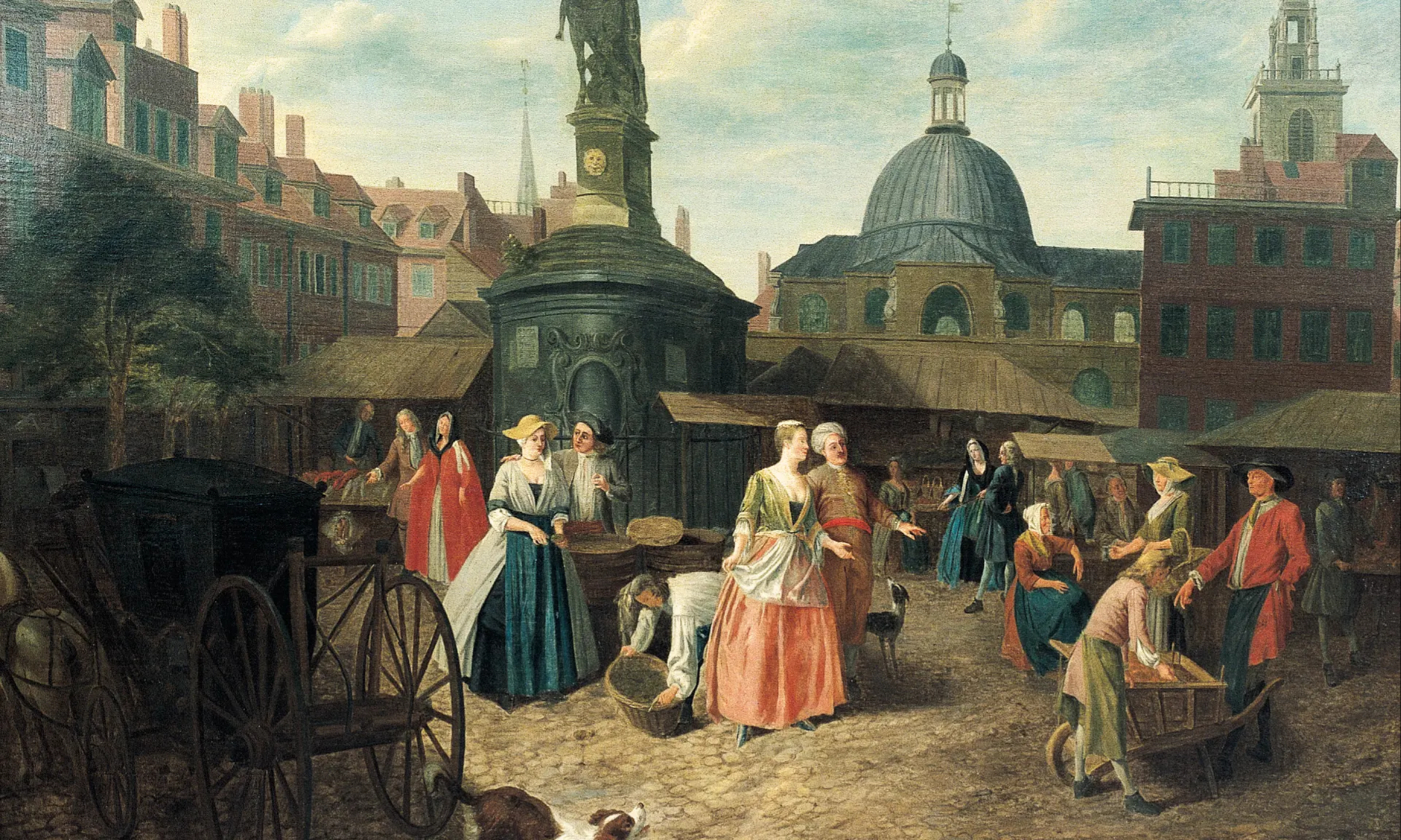
The Old Stocks Market in London

His workshop was located in King Street, Seven Dials. He lived in Southampton Row, Bloomsbury, where he died in 1749. According to George Vertue he was about fifty years old at the time of his death and had spent more than 30 years in England. Ramsay and Hudson were joint executors of van Aken's will. His younger brother, Alexander van Aken was also a drapery painter and was employed by Hudson after Joseph's death. Another brother, Arnoldus, was also a painter known for small conversation pieces and a series of paintings of fish which were later engraved and published under the title The Wonders of the Deep (1736).

== Work ==
Van Aken started out as a painter of genre scenes and conversation pieces and to a lesser extent, portraits. He later became almost full time employed by portrait painters in England as a drapery painter and only occasionally still produced genre works for his own account.

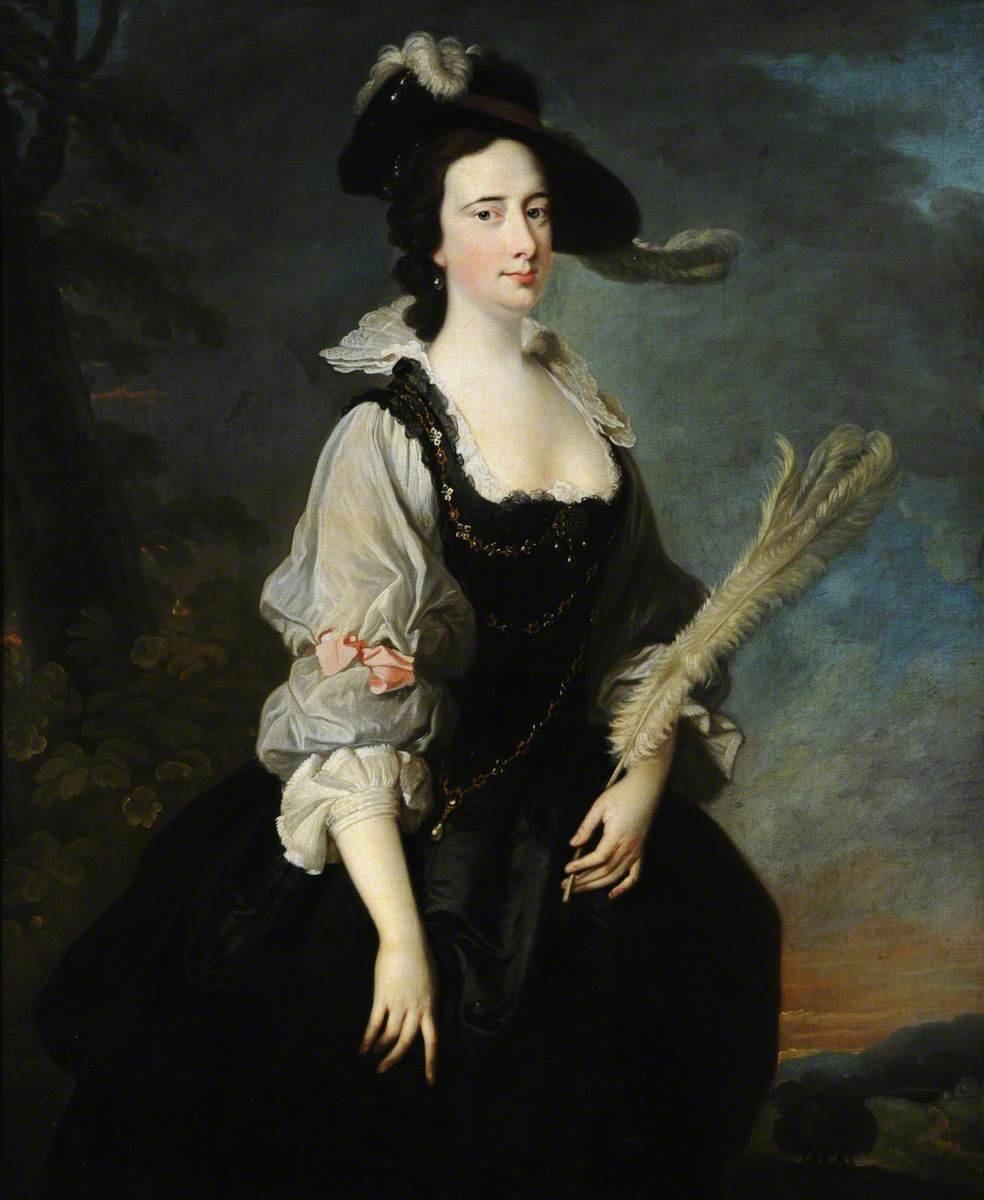
Portrait of Lady Lucy Manners

In Antwerp van Aken painted genre scenes in the Flemish tradition such as the work the Washerwomen (1715, private collection). Upon his arrival in London he initially produced animated bourgeois interiors in subdued tonalities, such as Saying Grace (c. 1720, Ashmolean Museum). This painting offers a sober vision of piety and sufficiency as expressed in the ritual of the family dinner. These works were in the tradition of 17th century Flemish genre painting as developed further by contemporary Antwerp masters such as Jan Josef Horemans the Elder. He soon started painting conversation pieces: informal, but elegant group portraits in sophisticated colours of families or friends set in a domestic interior or more often in a garden setting. This new type of portrait painting was very popular in England from the 1720s. The persons depicted in conversation pieces may be members of a family as well as friends, members of a society or hunt, or some other grouping who are shown sharing common activities such as hunts, meals, or musical parties. Van Aken together with other foreign artists such as Marcellus Laroon the Younger, Philippe Mercier and Peter Angelis played a role in the development of genre paintings into conversation pieces in 1720s England.

From 1735 onwards he worked as a drapery painter for many leading portrait painters such as Allan Ramsay, Thomas Hudson, Joseph Highmore and George Knapton as well as lesser figures also outside of London. The portrait painters would send the unfinished pictures to his London studio or painted the head on a separate piece of canvas so it could be pasted onto the costumed figure that he had painted. An example is the Portrait of Lady Lucy Manners (circa 1742 - 1749, National Trust, England) painted in collaboration with Thomas Hudson.

Van Aken's participation in portraits in the 1730s and 1740s is evidenced by a series of drapery studies preserved in the Scottish National Gallery which relate to his collaborations with Hudson and Allan Ramsay. Van Aken's contributions helped popularise the Van Dyck costume amongst patrician sitters in the 1730s. The contributions of Van Aken were highly regarded by contemporaries and George Vertue placed him on the same level as the portrait painters themselves. As Van Aken and his brother worked for a great many portrait painters Vertue observed that 'its very difficult to know one hand from another' (i.e. it was difficult to distinguish which portrait painter was responsible for a particular portrait).
