= Margrete Auken =

Danish politician (born 1945)

Margrete Auken MEP
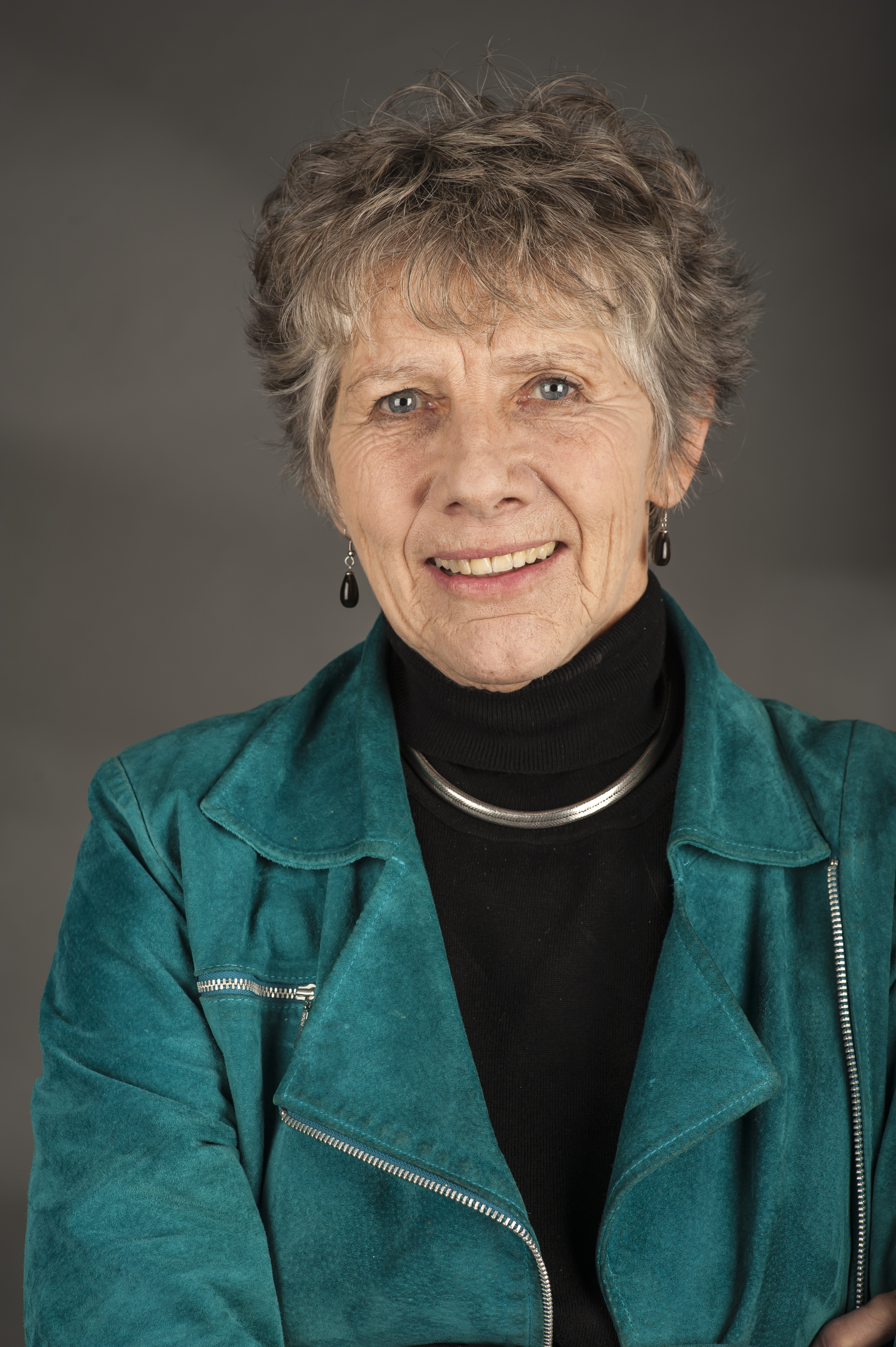

Member of the European Parliament
- Incumbent
- Assumed office 20 July 2004
- Constituency: Denmark

Member of the Folketing
- In office 22 October 1979 – 20 July 2004
- Constituency: Århus

Personal details
- Born: Margrete Gunnarsdatter Auken; 6 January 1945 (age 81) Århus, Denmark
- Party: Danish; Socialistisk Folkeparti; EU; European Green Party
- Spouse: Erik Aksel Nielsen
- Children: 3, including Ida Auken
- Parent: Kirsten Auken (mother)
- Relatives: Svend Auken (brother)
- Education: University of Copenhagen
- Website: www.auken.dk

Margrete Gunnarsdatter Auken (born 6 January 1945) is a Danish politician who served as a Member of the European Parliament (MEP) from 2004 to 2024. She is a member of the Socialistisk Folkeparti, part of the European Green Party. She was also formerly a Member of the Folketing.

Auken was educated at the University of Copenhagen and is a sognepræst (parish priest) at the Frederiksberg Church in the Church of Denmark.

== Political career ==
Auken was a member of the Danish parliament from October 1979 to December 1990 and from September 1994 to June 2004.

When she was elected as the sole candidate for SF for the European Parliament in 2004 Auken sparked an uproar in SF by choosing to join the European Green Party – European Free Alliance instead of the European United Left – Nordic Green League without the approval of SF.

In parliament, Auken served on the Committee on the Environment, Public Health and Food Safety from 2014. She had previously been a member of the Committee on Transport and Tourism (2004–2007), the Committee on Development (2005–2009). In 2007 she also joined the Committee on Petitions.

In addition to her committee assignments, Auken was a member of the Delegation for relations with Palestine. She is also part of the European Parliament Intergroup on the Welfare and Conservation of Animals and the European Parliament Intergroup on Seas, Rivers, Islands and Coastal Areas.

Auken was re-elected in 2019.

== Personal life ==
Auken's brother was Svend Auken. She has three children. Her daughter Ida Auken is also a priest and politician, though since 2014 she has been a member of the Danish Social Liberal Party, unlike her mother. The younger Auken was Minister of the Environment in the Cabinet of Helle Thorning-Schmidt I.
