= St Martin's Lane Academy =

Former art school in London, England

Coordinates: 51°30′42″N 0°7′38.4″W

The St Martin's Lane Academy, a precursor of the Royal Academy, was organised in 1735 by William Hogarth, from the circle of artists and designers who gathered at Slaughter's Coffee House at the upper end of St Martin's Lane, London. The artistic set that introduced the Rococo style to England was centred on "Old Slaughter's" and the drawing-classes at the St. Martin's Lane Academy were inextricably linked in the dissemination of new artistic ideas in England in the reigns of George II and George III.

== History ==
In Britain in the early eighteenth century there was no organised public official patronage of the arts, aside from commissions for specific projects. There was no established body to compare with the Académie royale de peinture et de sculpture that Jean-Baptiste Colbert had established in France, and no public exhibitions of recent paintings along the lines of the Paris Salon, held every other year.

The closest approximation to an academic life-drawing class was established in Great Queen Street in 1711 under twelve directors, with Sir Godfrey Kneller as its governor. George Vertue, a founder-member, describes it as "the Academy of Painting", although there is no evidence that any painting was ever done there. Sir James Thornhill took over from Kneller in 1718, but a few years later, after a period of infighting, he started a new academy, conducting life-drawing classes from a room he added to his own house in James Street, Covent Garden, from 1724 while a faction led by John Vanderbank and Louis Chéron set up what they advertised as "The Academy for the Improvement of Painters and Sculptors by drawing from the Naked" at premises in St Martin's Lane. It proved popular, but failed after a few years when the subscriptions were embezzled by the treasurer. Thornhill continued his life-classes until his death in May 1734, but had little success in finding subscribers. Hogarth, (who was Thornhill's son-in-law) attributed its failure at least in part to the competition from Vanderbank and Cheron.

It was Hogarth who established the St. Martin's Lane Academy in 1735, using the equipment from Thornhill's studio, and he remained its central figure. It is sometimes referred to as the "Second St Martin's Lane Academy", to differentiate it from that of Vanderbank and Chéron. Hogarth wrote an account of its formation in about 1760, in which he takes credit for the democratic principle that all should contribute an equal sum to the Academy's expenses and have an equal vote, "attributing the failure of the previous academies to the leading members having assumed a superiority which their fellow-students could not brook." Thus the academy abandoned hierarchic seventeenth-century precedents and was formed on the basis of a club. The members of the academy took turns to "set" the model – that is decide his or her pose – rather than having this done by a paid director of the sort employed in French academies. Hogarth was opposed to copying from pictures, but there may have been casts to work from, inherited from Thornhill's studio. The premises of the Academy were a large room in Peter's Court, entered from St Martin's Lane through a low vaulted passageway.

The membership of the academy was formed from an informal, club-like circle that was in the habit of meeting at Old Slaughter's Coffee House, which had been at 74 and 75, St. Martin's Lane since 1692, when the neighbourhood was still distinctly suburban. It was known as"Old" Slaughter's Coffee House after 1742, when a new Slaughter's Coffee House opened, at no. 82 (more recently the site of Westminster County Court).

Hogarth seems to have had some assistance in running the academy. George Vertue noted early in 1745 "The academy for the study of painting & other artists [sic] is carryd on and conducted by several, Ellis, Hayman, Gravelot, Wills— &c..." Of these four named by Vertue, the most obscure is James Wills (working c. 1740–1777), later the Rev. James Wills. In 1754 he made a translation of du Fresnoy's stilted and old-fashioned Latin poem on the art of painting, De arte graphica, which did not meet a successful reception. but which apparently identifies Wills as the "Fresnoy" who published bitterly sarcastic invective at Sir Joshua Reynolds and artists like Zoffany who had left the Society of Artists to join the newly founded Royal Academy. His conversation piece The Andrews Family (signed "J. Wills pinxit" and dated 1749) is in the collection of the Fitzwilliam Museum. Edward Edwards' continuation of Walpole's Anecdotes of Painters (1808:55) notes that Wills had painted some portraits and historical subjects, "but not meeting much success in his profession he quit it, and having received a liberal education, took orders. He was for some years curate at Cannons, Middlesex, where the prominent cabinet-maker of St. Martin's Lane William Hallett had built a residence on part of the foundations of the great demolished house. In 1772 Wills was appointed to the living at Canons by Hallett's grandson, the subject, with his wife, of Gainsborough's The Morning Walk (1787).

Hogarth's involvement with the academy began to decline in 1753, following the circulation by its secretary, Francis Milner Newton, of a letter calling a meeting with the intention of electing 24 artists as professors of a putative public academy. Hogarth had long been opposed to the idea of such an institution. Newton's plans came to nothing, and the academy continued, under Francis Hayman and George Michael Moser. Moser moved the school to Pall Mall in 1767, and it closed four years later, when he became the first keeper of the Royal Academy.

== Membership ==
Among the members of the St. Martin's Lane Academy were the engraver and book illustrator Hubert Gravelot; François Roubiliac, a French sculptor established in London; the painter Francis Hayman and his pupil, the very young Thomas Gainsborough who was employed by Gravelot; the Swiss-born artist and enameller George Michael Moser; the medallist Richard Yeo and the architect Isaac Ware. Desmond Fitz-Gerald notes that an asterisk in the list of subscribers to Joshua Kirby's, Dr Brook Taylor's Method of Perspective Made Easy (London 1754) identifies members of the St. Martin's Lane Academy, and notes as further members the architect James Paine; Charles, son of Henry Cheere, sculptor; and Johann Sebastian Müller, an engraver of Chippendale's Director.

An unexpected member of the circle was James Stuart, trained as a painter but familiar as one of the earliest practitioners of Neoclassicism in Europe; that later phase was far in the future when he moved in the Academy's milieu, introduced by the engravers Louis and Joseph Goupy, both of whom were members.

The painters involved in the academy were reacting against the Italianate Late Baroque manner exemplified by Thornhill himself, while the designers were developing alternatives to the cool Neo-Palladianism being espoused at the time by Lord Burlington and William Kent; the rococo artists found patrons, as Mark Girouard first noted, in the circle that formed around Frederick, Prince of Wales in Leicester Square.

== Old Slaughter's Coffee House ==
Not all the artists in St. Martin's Lane were members of the Academy. Matthew Lock, the draughtsman and engraver who engraved most of the designs for Chippendale's Director, advertised in 1748 that he was offering evening drawing-classes for tradesmen and students in his premises "Facing Old Slaughter's Coffee House". and Thomas Chippendale, the most famous maker of English rococo furniture, seem never to have joined.

Other French Protestant emigrés were drawn to the mix of English and foreigners at Slaughter's. Abraham de Moivre, friend of Newton and Halley, eked out a meagre existence as a tutor, spending evening hours at Slaughter's. at the time chiefly interesting to gamblers seeking to maximise their odds rather than to statisticians. Other intellectuals were drawn to the atmosphere of Slaughter's: Joseph Priestley met in a virtual "Slaughter's Club" with Josiah Wedgwood, Captain Cook and Sir Joseph Banks.

The presence of several outstanding cabinetmakers in St. Martin's Lane was influential in translating Rococo designs into furnishings. In December 1753, directly across from Old Slaughter's Thomas Chippendale took a long lease on three houses that served as his premises for the rest of his career. A chance remark establishes that the cabinet-maker John Linnell attended life-classes at the St. Martin's Lane Academy, and William Hallett also had workshops in the Lane.

In the 1760s Old Slaughter's Coffee House was the place where the Italian painter Antonio Zucchi, brought to London by Robert Adam, formed a friendship with the literary intellectual Jean-Paul Marat, "a man of extensive classical learning who continually proposed subjects which he had selected for Zucchi to design", the painter Joseph Farington noted in his diary, after Marat's subsequent revolutionary career had run its course; Marat came to Zucchi's house "in the most familiar manner, a knife and fork laid for him every day." At a later date it was "over a Neck of Veal and Potatoes, at the Old Slaughter Coffee House", that the liberal scientific Club of Honest Whigs, centred on the figure of Benjamin Franklin was formed.

The artistic circle meeting at Old Slaughter's Coffee House was revived from its obscurity in a series of articles by Mark Girouard.
