= A Company of Artists =

Painting by Gawen Hamilton

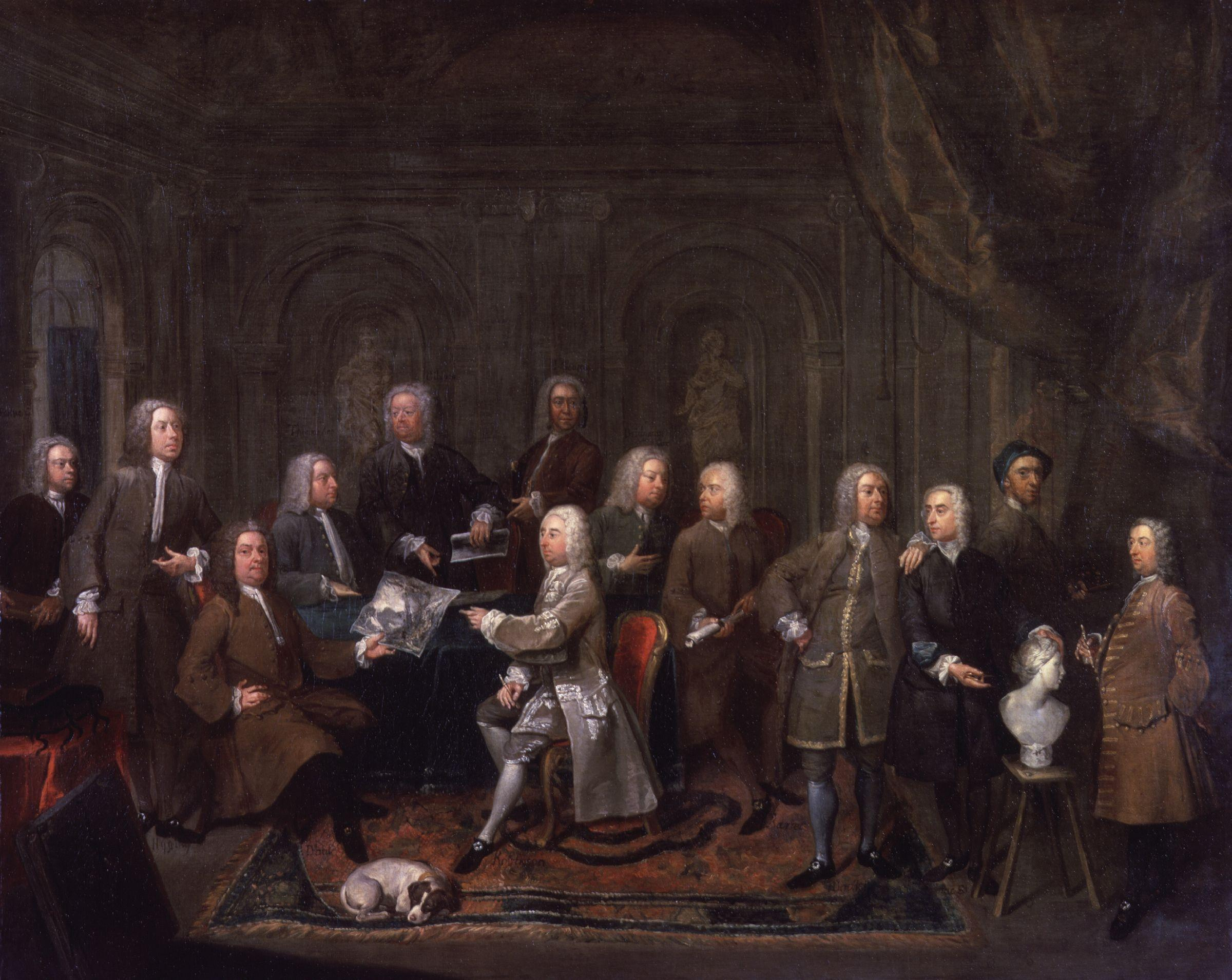
- Artist: Gawen Hamilton
- Year: 1735
- Type: Oil on canvas, portrait painting
- Dimensions: 87.6 cm × 111.5 cm (34.5 in × 43.9 in)
- Location: National Portrait Gallery; London

A Company of Artists is a 1735 group portrait painting by the Scottish artist Gawen Hamilton. It depicts a gathering of artists and architects at the Kings Arms tavern in Bond Street. It is also known by the alternative title Conversation of Virtuosis at the Kings Arms after a description given to it by George Vertue.

The sitters featured include George Vertue, Hans Hysing, Michael Dahl, James Gibbs, Joseph Goupy, Bernard Baron, John Wootton, Charles Bridgeman, William Kent and John Michael Rysbrack as well as Hamilton himself. The final picture was raffled with each of the sitters paying four guineas to enter. Today it is in the collection of the National Portrait Gallery in London, having been purchased in 1904.

== Bibliography ==
- Gƒaldy, Andrea. Collecting Nature. Cambridge Scholars Publishing, 2015.
- Ingamells, John. National Portrait Gallery Later Stuart Portraits, 1685-1714.
