= 1731 to 1735 in sports =

Events in world sport through the years 1731 to 1735.

== Boxing ==
Events

- 6 May 1733 – James Figg and Jack Broughton fought in a six-round exhibition match.
- 1734 – Pipes was defeated twice by Jack Broughton (the "Father of Boxing"), but it is unclear if these were championship fights. Apparently, Broughton did not claim the title at that time.
- 1734 – George Taylor, another of Figg's students, defeated Bill Gretting in London.
- 1734 – Broughton defeated Bill Gretting twice, but it is unclear if it was a championship fight.
- 8 December 1734 – James Figg dies. His student George Taylor takes over his amphitheatre.
- 10 December 1734 – Taylor claimed the Championship of England title. He also built his own amphitheatre where he trained boxers and fought there on occasion.

== Cricket ==
Events

- Cricket became the first sport to enclose its venues and charge for admission. Ground enclosure is first recorded in 1731 when the playing area on Kennington Common was staked out and roped off. The same practice was in use at the Artillery Ground in 1732. Spectators at the Artillery Ground were being charged admission of two pence by the early 1740s but it remains unclear when charges were first introduced (probably in the 1730s).
- London Cricket Club, which played most of its home matches at the Artillery Ground, was the dominant club in 1730s cricket, especially in 1732.
- Frederick, Prince of Wales, became a major patron of cricket from 1733.

== Sources ==
- Buckley, G. B. (1935). Fresh Light on 18th Century Cricket. Cotterell.
- Maun, Ian (2009). From Commons to Lord's, Volume One: 1700 to 1750. Roger Heavens. ISBN 978-1-900592-52-9.
- McCann, Tim (2004). Sussex Cricket in the Eighteenth Century. Sussex Record Society.
- Waghorn, H. T. (1906). The Dawn of Cricket. Electric Press.
