= John Ellys =

English portrait painter (1701–1757)

John Ellys or Ellis (March 1701 – 14 September 1757) was an English portrait-painter.

== Life ==
Ellys was born in March 1701. When he was about fifteen years old, he was placed for instruction under Sir James Thornhill. After a short time he took instruction under Johann Rudolph Schmutz; he also remained under Schmutz only a short time. He subsequently became an imitator of John Vanderbank and was a student with William Hogarth and others in the academy that Louis Chéron and Vanderbank founded in October 1720 in St Martin's Lane. After a few years Ellys and Hogarth succeeded to the directorship of this St Martin's Lane Academy, and maintained their connection with it for about thirty years.

When he was still young Ellys obtained a warrant to copy pictures in the royal palaces for study, and copied several pictures by Anthony van Dyck, Godfrey Kneller, Peter Lely, and others. Of the Kneller school of portrait-painting, he disliked the innovations of Sir Joshua Reynolds. He eventually succeeded to Vanderbank's house and practice, and having already purchased from Moses Vanderbank a share of the place of tapestry-maker to the Crown, eventually obtained that position also. Ellys was consulted and employed by Sir Robert Walpole in the formation of his collection of pictures, and was sent to Holland to purchase from the Princess of Friesland The Virgin and Angels by Vandyck, which was subsequently held in the Hermitage Gallery. For his services Walpole rewarded Ellys with the sinecure of master keeper of the lions in the Tower, which Ellys retained until his death.

In October 1736 Ellys succeeded Philip Mercier as the principal painter to Frederick, Prince of Wales, He was a member of the committee of artists appointed in 1755 to frame a plan for constructing a royal academy, but he did not survive to see the result of their efforts, because he died on 14 September 1757. The Royal Academy was established by royal decree in 1768.

== Works ==
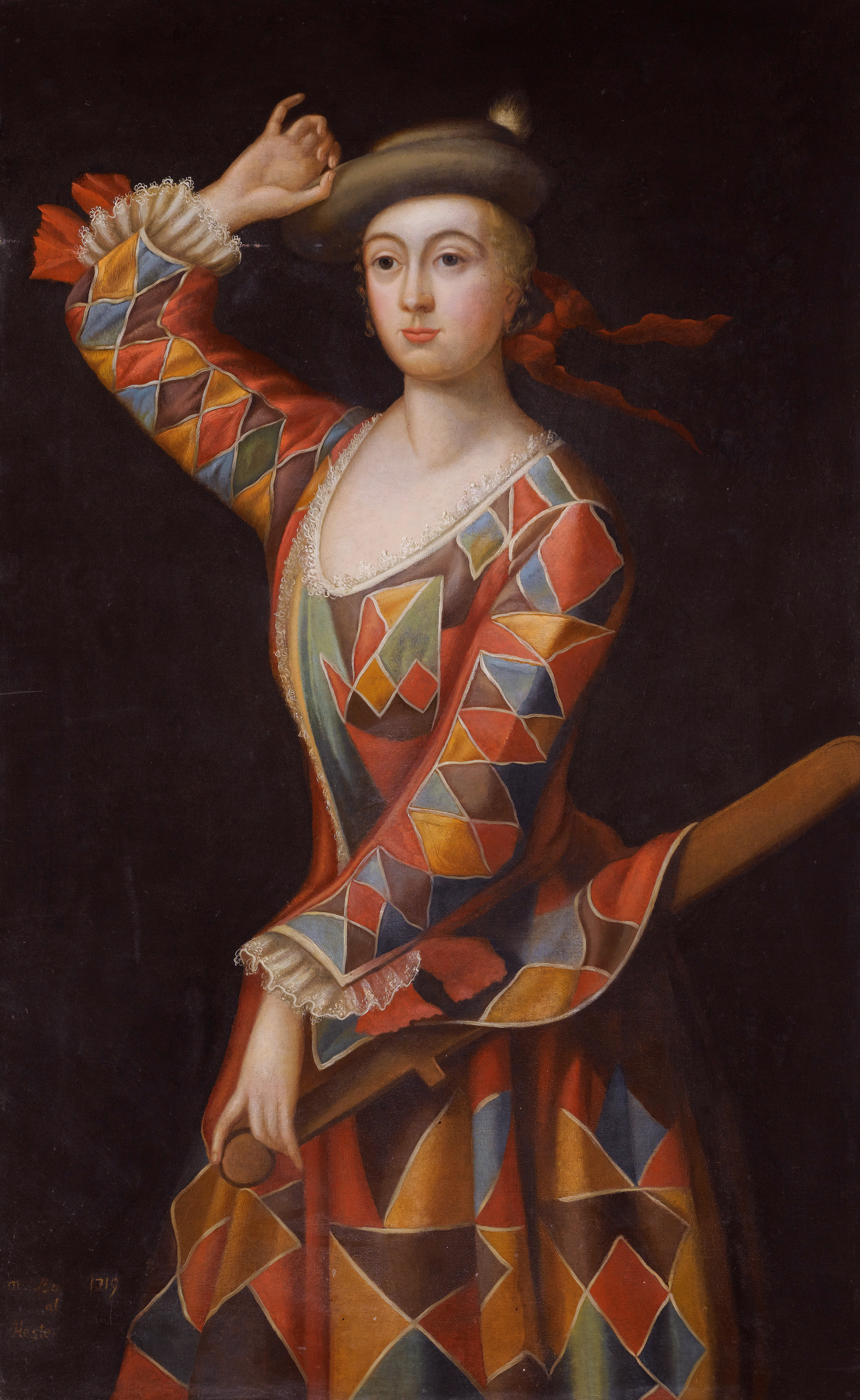
Hester Booth as a harlequin, by John Ellys

A 1727 Ellys portrait of Lord Whitworth and his nephew was at Knole in Kent. Many of his portraits were engraved by John Faber the Younger, including: Lavinia Fenton, Duchess of Bolton; James Figg the pugilist; Frederick, Prince of Wales; Henry Medley; George Oldham; Lord Mayor Humphrey Parsons; William Wake, archbishop of Canterbury; Thomas Walker, the actor, as Captain Macheath; Robert Wilks the actor, and George Stanhope, dean of Canterbury. The Stanhope portrait was also engraved by J. Sympson. Among engravings by other artists from Ellys's portraits were Kitty Clive, by John Tinney; Sir Charles Wager, by George White; and Edmund Gibson, bishop of London, by George Vertue.
