= George Taylor (boxer) =

English boxer

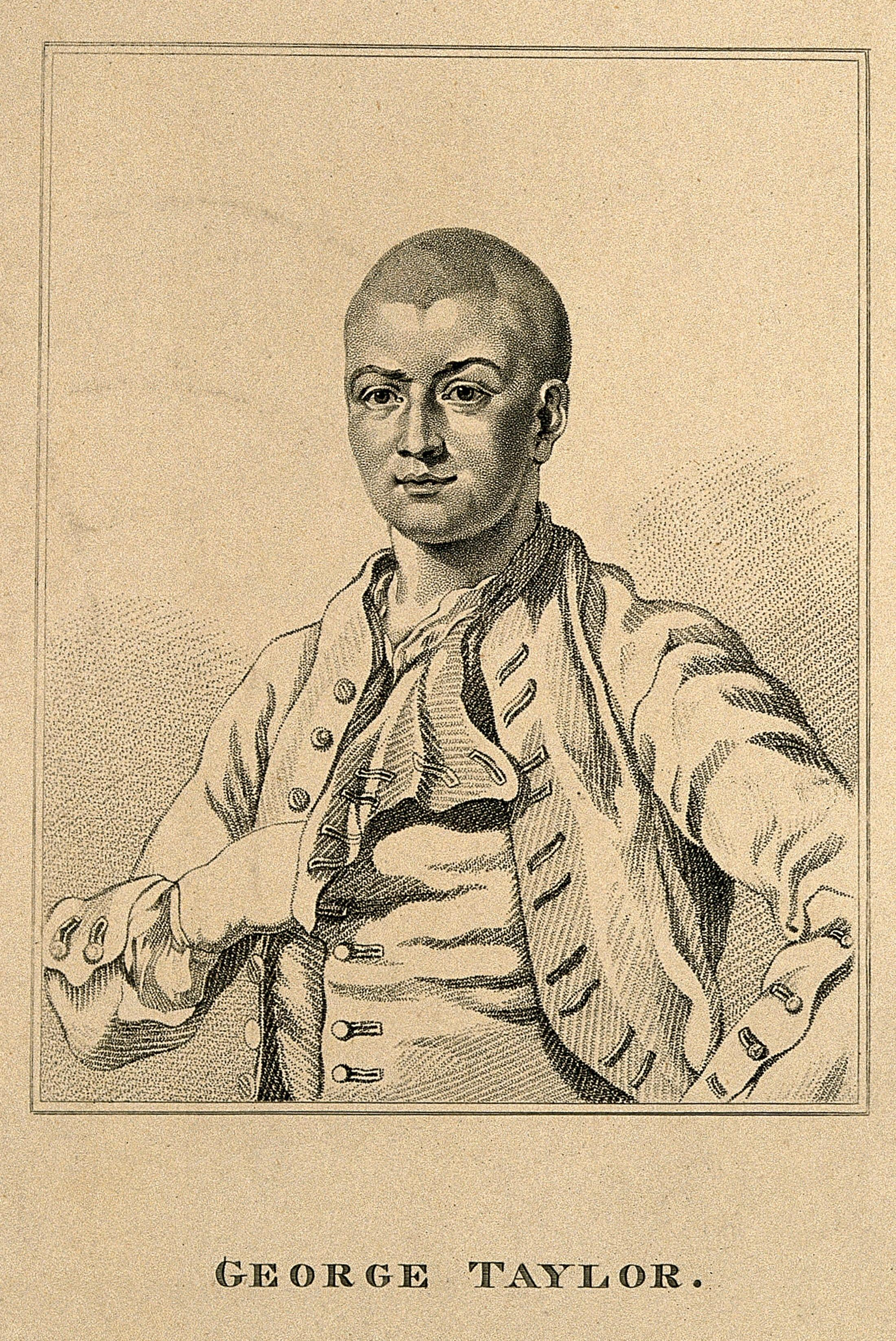
Engraving of George Taylor

George Taylor (fl. 1734–1750) was an English boxer also known by the nickname George the Barber. His mentor was James Figg, whose boxing booth Taylor had fought in since 1719. Taylor took over Figg's "Great Booth" in Tottenham Court Road after Figg's death in 1734. One of the main attractions at Taylor's establishment was Jack Broughton, the leading boxer of the era, but Taylor and Broughton soon fell out and the latter opened his own ring.

Like Figg, Taylor is remembered primarily because of his relationship with the painter William Hogarth, who admired boxers and used them as models. Hogarth created an elaborate design for Taylor's gravestone, featuring the boxer pummeling death himself.
