= Hans Hysing =

Swedish portrait-painter in England

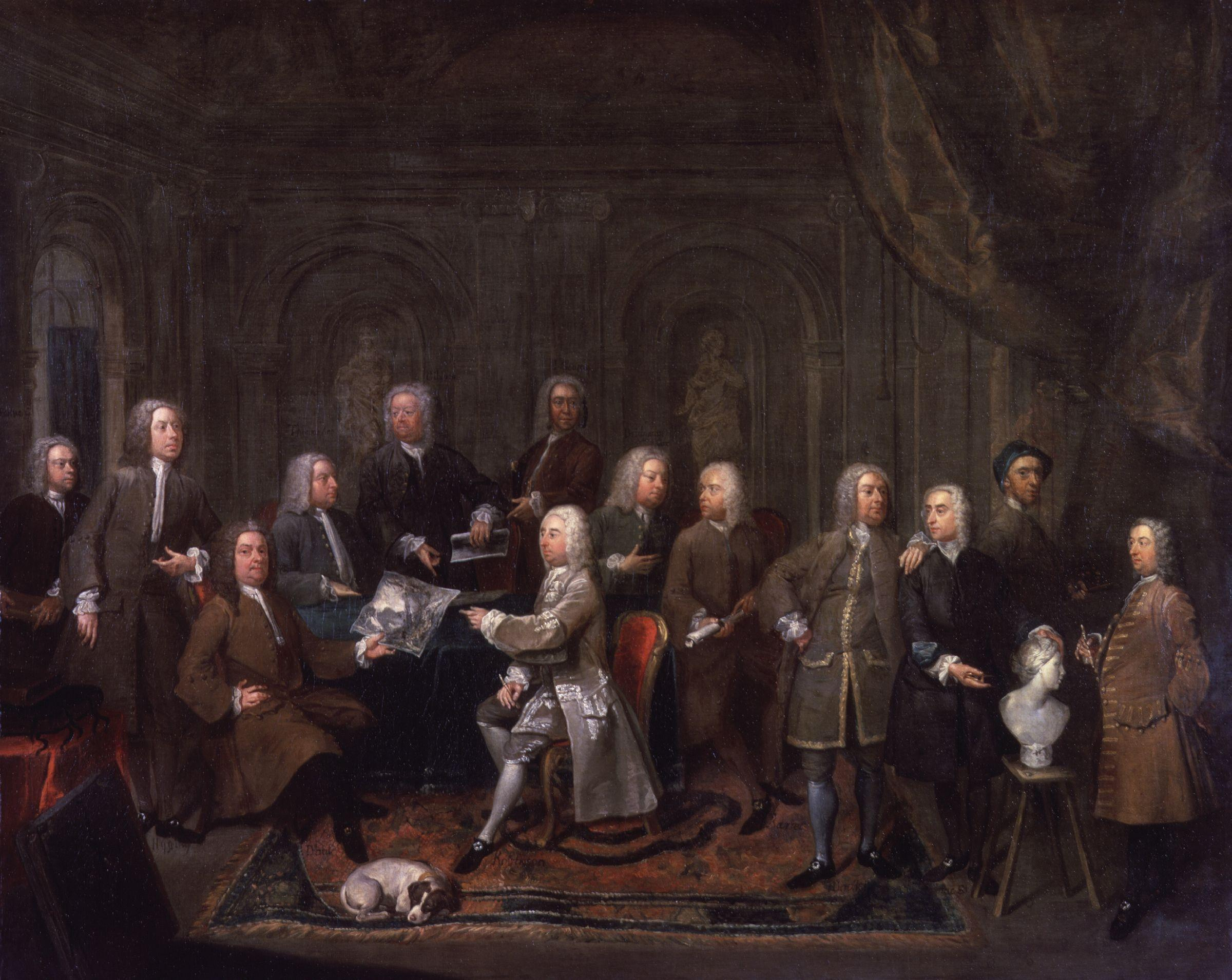
Hysing (second from left) in the 1735 group portrait A Company of Artists by Gawen Hamilton

Hans Huyssing or Hans Hysing (1678–1752 or 1753) was a Swedish-born portrait painter who worked in England.

== Biography ==
Hysing was born in Stockholm, Sweden, and apprenticed to a goldsmith before studying portrait painting under David von Krafft. Hysing went to England in 1700 as assistant to fellow Swedish portrait painter Michael Dahl, with whom he lived for many years.

Hysing succeeded to Dahl's practice after the latter's death, and also adopted Dahl's manner. Hysing's patrons were the family of George II, painting the queen, the three royal princesses, and George III as a boy. Many of Hysing's portraits, including Sir Robert Walpole, the speaker Arthur Onslow, Dr. John Theophilus Desaguliers, and architect James Gibbs were engraved in mezzotint by John Faber (1695–1756), and others.
