= Marcellus Laroon the Younger =

British painter

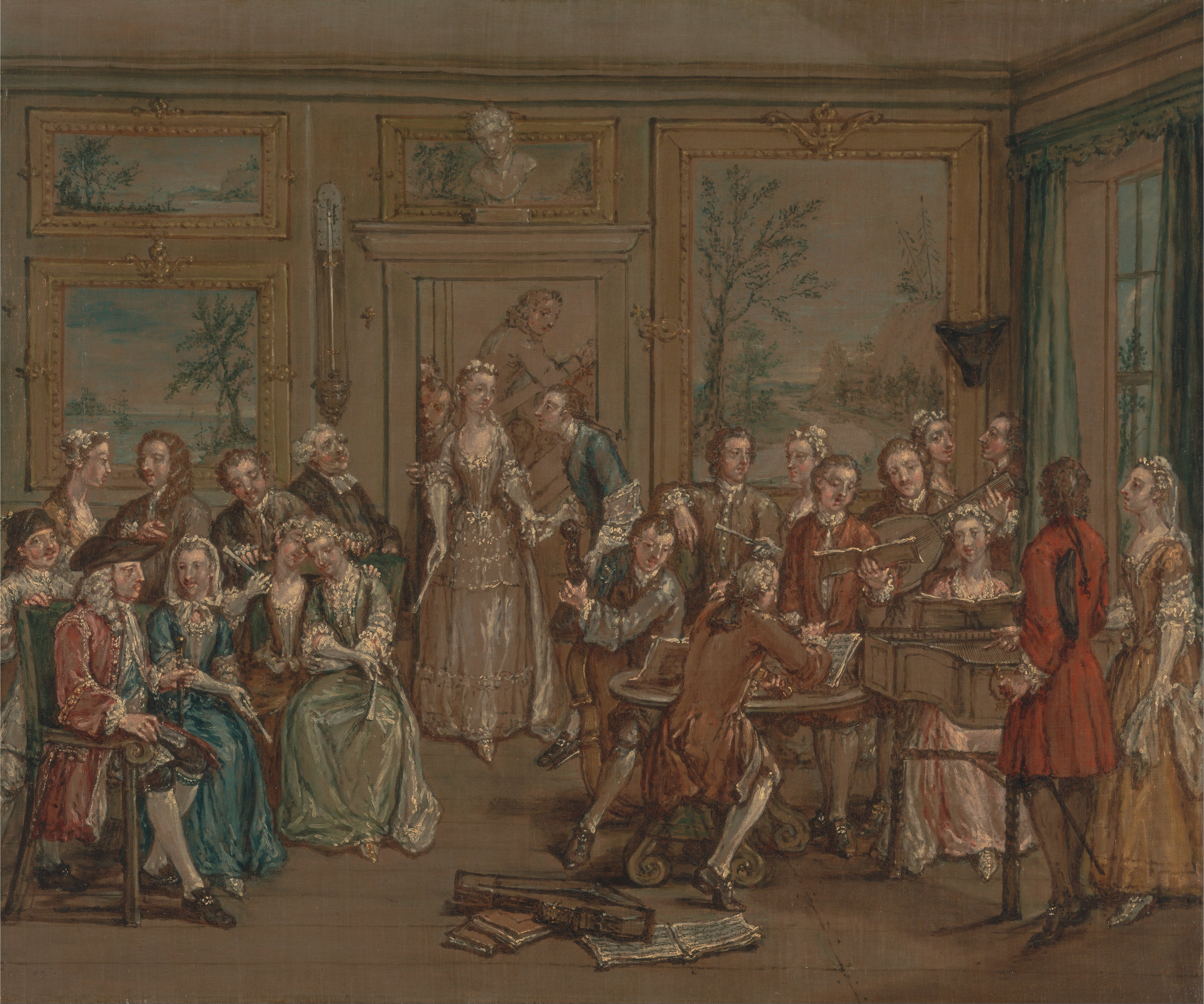
Musical Conversation, c. 1760, Yale

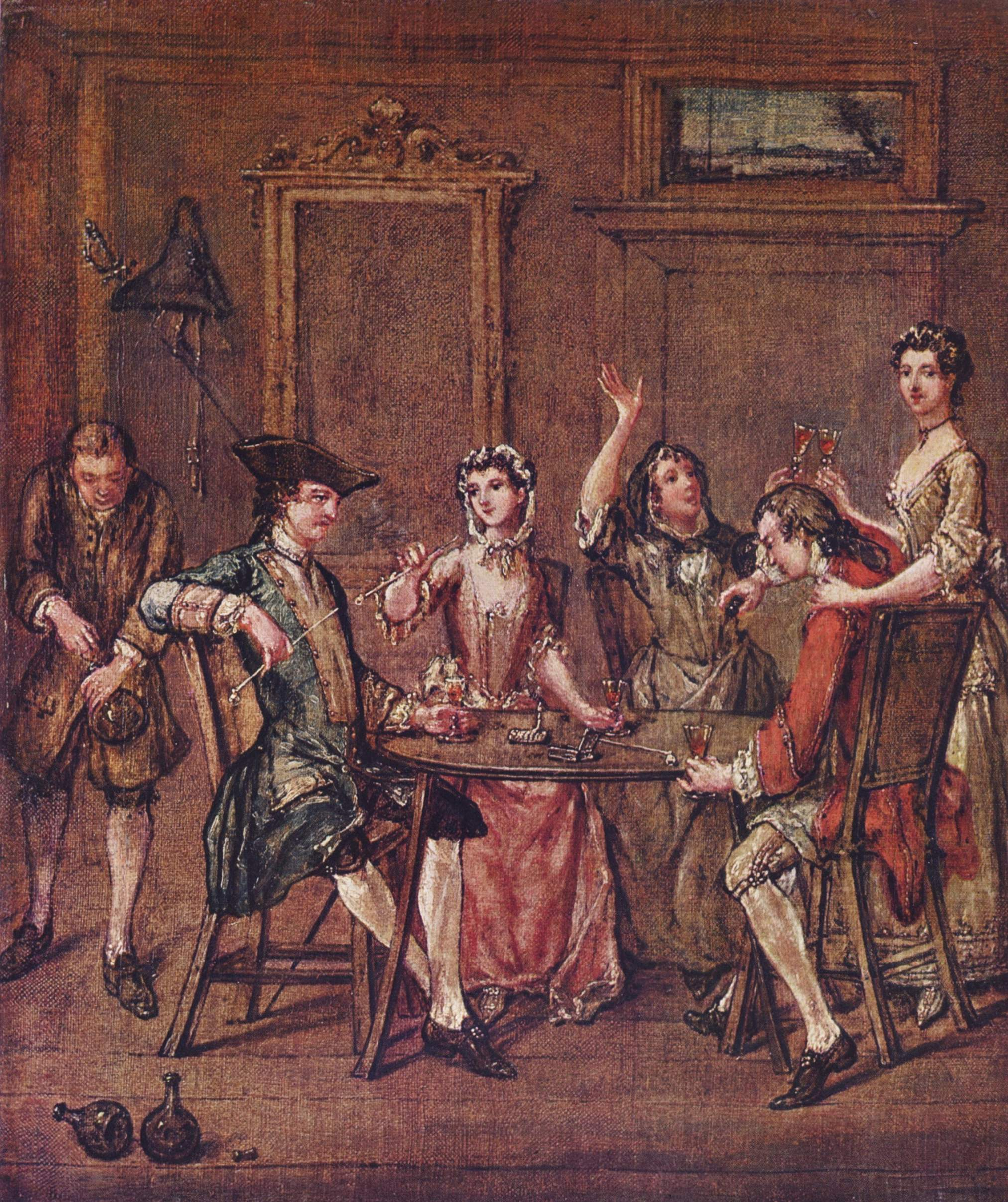
Interior with Figures, by Marcellus Laroon the Younger, Tate, 1750s

Marcellus Laroon the Younger (2 April 1679 – 1 June 1772) was an English painter and draughtsman of French origin. He specialized in social genre scenes, and he frequented the world of actors and painters around Covent Garden in London that he painted. George Vertue, a contemporary who knew him well, said he painted for pleasure rather than profit.

Laroon was born in Chiswick, Middlesex. His father Marcellus Laroon was a Dutch-born painter and engraver, with a French artist father called Marcellus Lauron. Laroon the Elder brought his son to England whilst a child, and his career was entirely in England. In 1707 he enlisted in the army, participating in campaigns in Flanders, Spain and Scotland. During a break on half-pay from military life (c. 1712-15) he joined the Rose and Crown Club in London and trained in Godfrey Kneller's Academy of Painting and Drawing. Most of Laroon's paintings date from after his retirement from the army, with the rank of captain, in 1732. In the late 1750s Laroon settled in Oxford, where he died in 1772.
