= Louis Goupy =

French painter

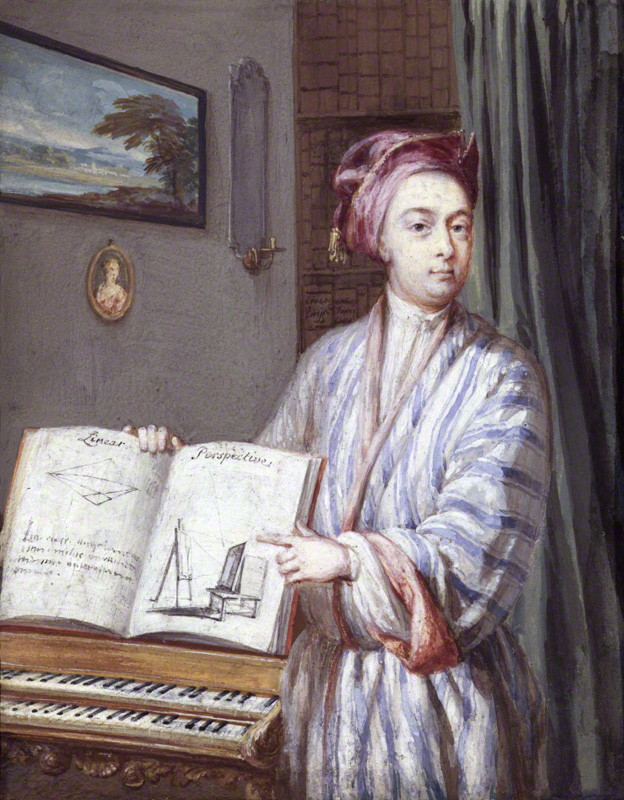
Louis Goupy, Portrait of Brook Taylor, the English mathematician, 1720

Louis or Lewis Goupy (c. 1674 – 2 December 1747) was a French painter, portraitist and miniaturist, who studied under Bernard Lens and was active in London by 1710 alongside his brother Charles Goupy. From 1710 to 1733 he lived in King Street, Covent Garden. He subscribed in 1711 to the Great Queen Street Academy begun under Sir Godfrey Kneller, but seceded from it in 1720 to the St Martin's Lane Academy begun by Louis Chéron and John Vanderbank. One of his patrons was Richard Boyle, 3rd Earl of Burlington, who on the return leg of his Grand Tour from Italy in 1715 was accompanied by Goupy. His students included his nephew Joseph Goupy. Goupy died in London.
