= Broughton Rules =

Set of rules in boxing

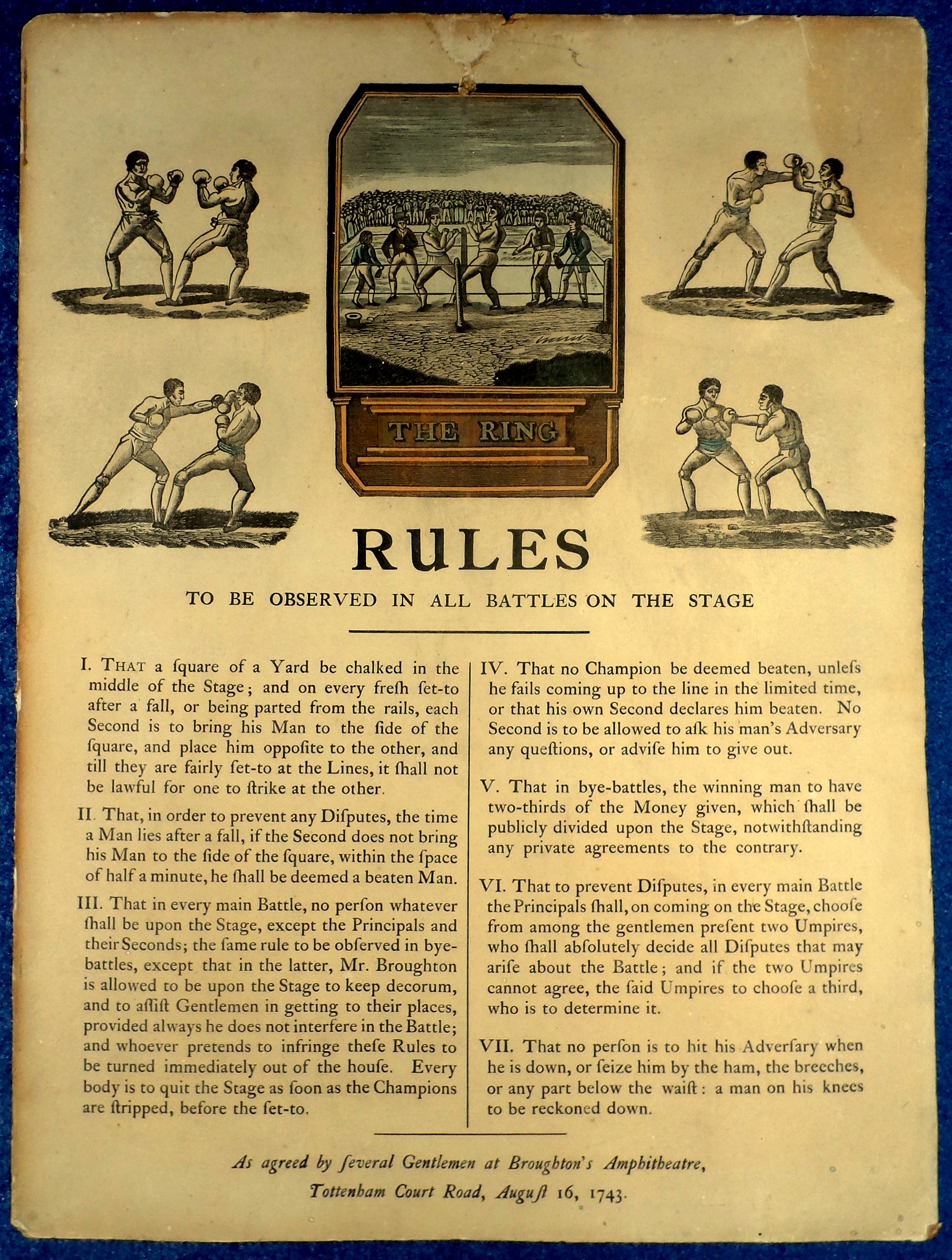
Broughton's seven rules from 16 August 1743

The Broughton Rules (also known as Broughton's rules) were the first set of rules that was adapted in the sport of boxing. The rules were written and codified by the English champion Jack Broughton in 1743. Many of the rules and limitations included in Broughton rules are still followed to this day, and they have become fundamentals for later boxing rules. The Broughton Rules were replaced by the London Prize Ring Rules in 1838.

== History ==
During Jack Broughton's time, bare-knuckle boxing had few to no rules. Shortly after opening an amphitheatre in London, he drew up the first standard set of rules for the sport, which he posted in his venue on 16 August 1743. His rules were:

1. A one-yard square must be drawn in the middle of the combat place, to which the "seconds", after the fall of one of the contestants or at the beginning of the fight, must take their pupils, placing them face to face. While both are in said square they cannot hit each other.
2. That in order to avoid any discussion regarding the time that a contestant remained down, it is established that if the "second" does not take his principal to the aforementioned square within thirty seconds after he was knocked down, he is considered beaten.
3. That in the main matches no one can enter the place of the same (ring), except for the contestants and their "seconds"; The same rule applies to preliminary bouts, but in the latter, the referee is allowed, as long as he does not interfere in the bout, to enter the place of the bout, to ask for correction and to demand that the spectators take their places; Anyone who violates these rules will be expelled from the place of the fight. When the wrestlers are ready for the fight and before the start of the fight, the place where it is held (ring) must be vacated.
4. That no contestant will be considered defeated unless after his fall he spent more time than the regulation to get into the square or his "second" declared him beaten. The latter are not allowed to ask questions of their ward's adversary, nor to advise him.
5. That at the end of the fight, the money collected will be distributed in public, at the place of the fight, and the winner will receive two-thirds, notwithstanding any private agreements that may be to the contrary.
6. That in order to avoid discussions, the contestants, upon arriving at the place of the fight, will choose two judges from among those present, who will decide on all the questions that may arise in the fight; If they do not agree, they will choose a third party to decide.
7. That it is not allowed to hit the opponent when he is on the ground, nor to grab him by the leg, by the breeches or by any part of the body located below the waist; a contestant will be considered down if on his knees.

=== Other details ===
Broughton was also the one to popularise the use of gloves for fighting, but this did not become a standard up until the mid-19th century. Also, during that time, other moves and techniques besides punching, such as wrestling and kicking, were still allowed. There were no limits to the number of rounds a bout should consist of, and individual rounds only ended when a man was knocked to the ground.

== Replacement ==
The Broughton rules were finally succeeded by the London Prize Ring Rules written by the British Pugilists' Protective Association in 1838 and further revised in 1853.
