= Gawen Hamilton =

Scottish painter

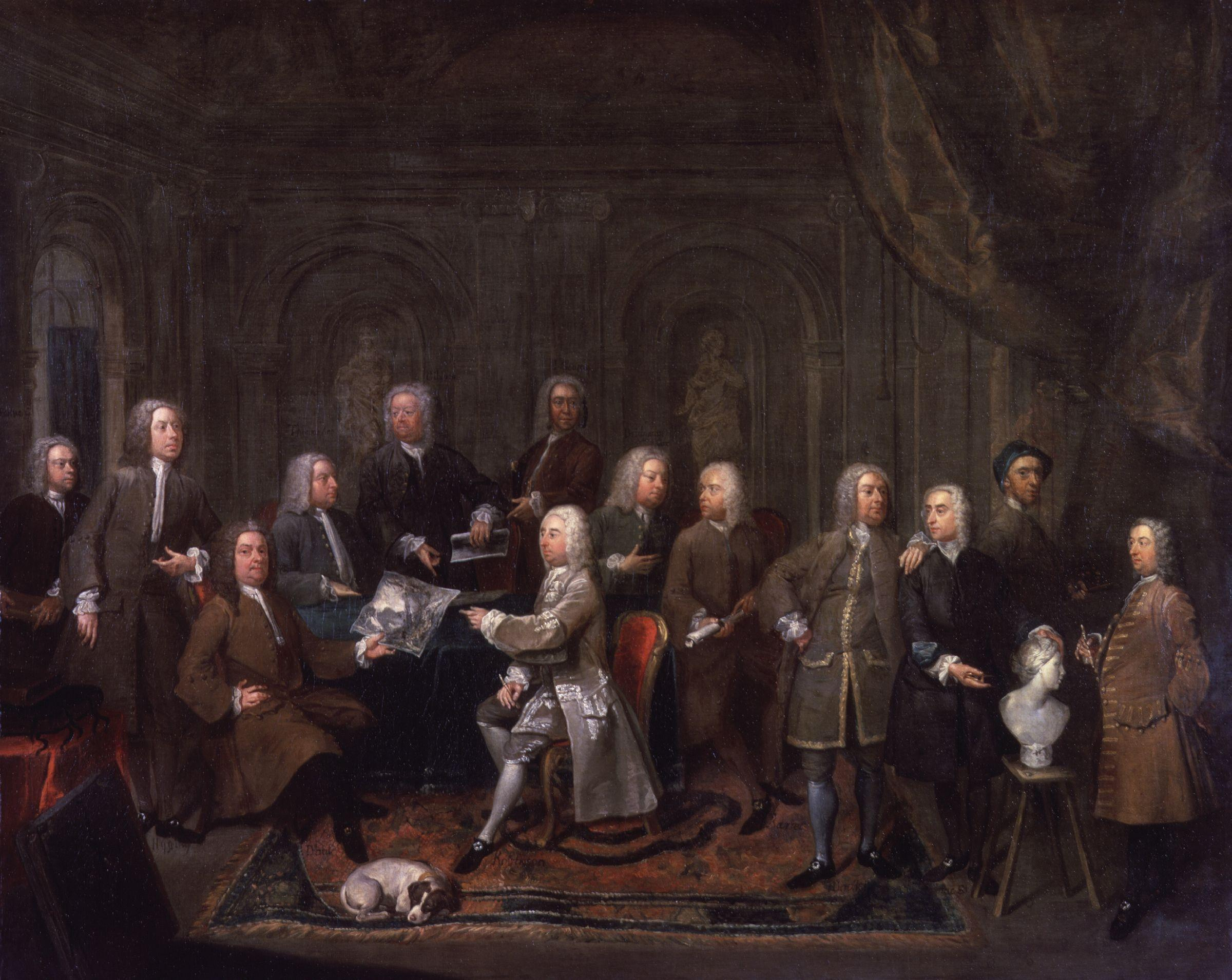
A Company of Artists (1735). National Portrait Gallery, London

Gawen Hamilton (1698 – 1737), easily confused with the later, more prominent artist Gavin Hamilton, was a Scottish painter working in London, a member of the Rose and Crown Club. He was one of the first wave of British born painters of 'conversation pieces' along with contemporaries such as William Hogarth and Charles Philips. These are works that depict groups of friends, families and acquaintances often engaging in a variety of genteel activities such as playing cards or taking tea. Some of Hamilton's pieces depict gatherings of artists and craftsmen such as the Rose and Crown Club itself.

Much of what is known of Hamilton is derived from the notebooks of George Vertue, who knew him well and was a fellow member, both of the convivial group that met at the Rose and Crown as well as the Club of Artists depicted by Hamilton in 1735, that met at the King's Arms in New Bond Street. The portrait of this club was commissioned by a subscription of its members, to aid Hamilton. The portrait itself was won by Joseph Goupy in a raffle in April 1735. Hamilton and Goupy, as well as other sitters in the portrait such as John Wootton, were part of a wider artistic social group including George Frideric Handel. Handel's trumpeter John Baptist Grano mentions Hamilton several times in his diary. Vertue described Hamilton as the superior of Hogarth ‘in Colouring and easy gracefull likeness’ - a possibly prejudiced view given their association. He also described Hamilton as one of ‘the most elevated Men in Art here now, [who] are the lowest of stature.

Vertue notes that he was born at Hamilton, near Glasgow, was trained by a little-known artist named Wilson, and excelled at groups with numerous small figures, which Vertue compares with William Hogarth, mentioning a group portrait of John Wootton and His Family and a portrait of the Earl and Countess of Strafford and Their Family.

Horace Walpole, who used Vertue's notes, makes no mention of Gawen Hamilton in his Anecdotes of Painting in England.

Hamilton died and was buried at St Paul's, Covent Garden on 28 October 1737.
