= Rose and Crown Club =

18th century London art club

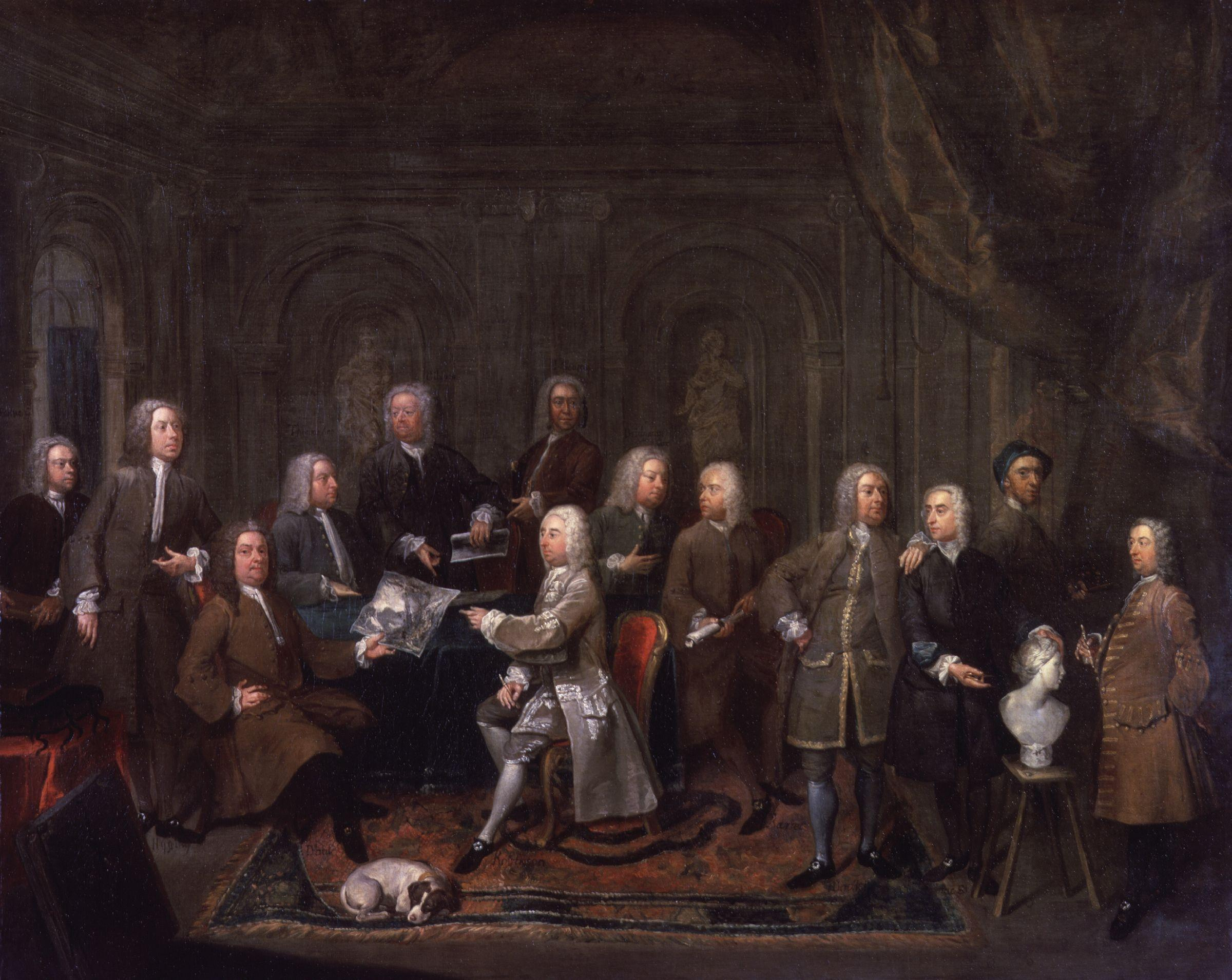
A Conversation of Virtuosis at the Kings Arms (in Bond Street), Gawen Hamilton, 1734–35. Not his group portrait of the club described in the text, but showing several members, including: Vertue, Dahl, Rysbrack, Kent and Hamilton himself.

The Rose and Crown Club was a club for artists, collectors and connoisseurs of art in early 18th-century London, England.

== History ==
The Rose and Crown Club "for Eminent Artificers of this Nation" was formed by 1704, when the engraver George Vertue was admitted; while it lasted, the club was among the more important of clubs for artists and connoisseurs. According to John Smibert's biographer Richard Saunders, the club was initially "a bawdy assembly of younger artists and cognoscenti, which met weekly" and apparently held its meetings at the Rose and Crown public house. in addition to Vertue, members included Bernard Lens III, Christian Friedrich Zincke, William Hogarth, Peter Tillemans, Marcellus Laroon the Younger and Michael Dahl.

The members of the club were known as the 'Rosacoronians'. An unfinished Hogarthian conversation piece painting in the Ashmolean Museum attributed to the Scottish painter Gawen Hamilton (another member), An Assembly of Virtuosi, shows a group of fifteen men, including eight who are identified in an etching of the painting by R. Cooper, published by W. B. Tiffin (1829), and it has been suggested that this is a group portrait of the Rosacoronians. The group includes Hamilton himself, Michael Dahl, John Vanderbank, the architect William Kent, and John Michael Rysbrack the sculptor. Vertue listed the painter and engraver Gerhard Bockman as a member in 1724.

The club was well connected with the older-established Virtuosi of St Luke (c. 1689–1743), with which it is sometimes confused, although it was less prestigious.

The Rose and Crown Club remained in existence until 1745 and held its last meeting at the Half-Moon Tavern. Bignamini notes that

The meetings and annual feasts of the Virtuosi of St Luke and of the Rose and Crown Club had come to a definitive end in 1745.
