= Joseph Goupy =

English painter

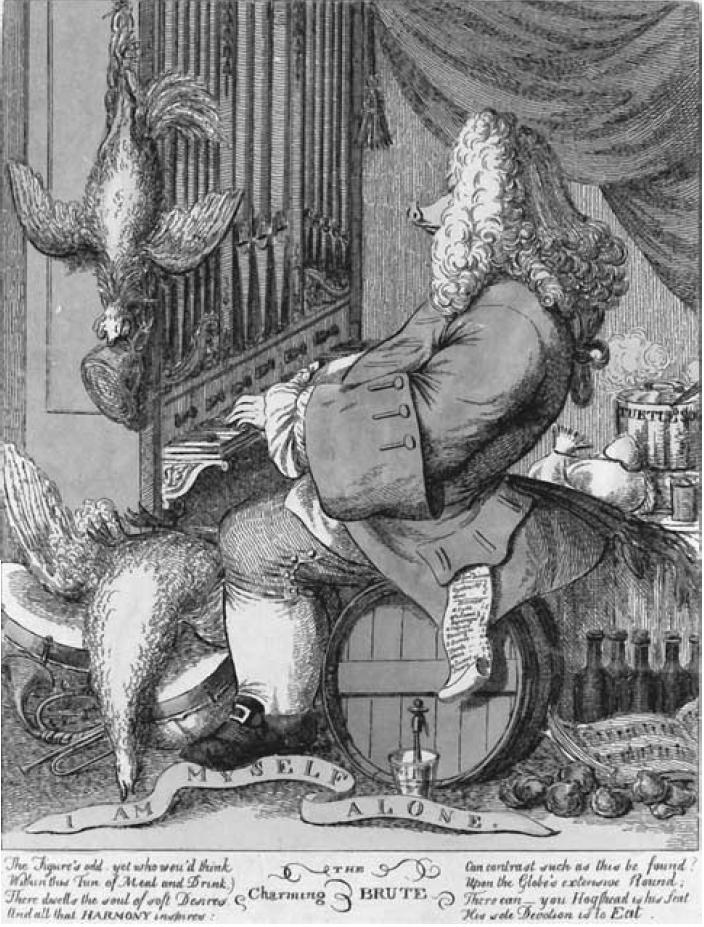
"The Charming Brute" - caricature by Joseph Goupy of Handel, 1754

Joseph Goupy (c. 1689–1769) was an English engraver, painter, set designer and watercolourist. He was of French descent living and working in London from at least 1711.

== Career ==
Born in London, he began as a student of his uncle, the notable painter Louis Goupy. Along with his uncle, he was one of the original subscribers to the Great Queen Street academy started by Godfrey Kneller and developed a reputation for reproducing old masters. He was especially known for reproducing the works of Salvator Rosa and his influence can be seen in his own compositions.

After painting copies of the Raphael Cartoons on commission for Baron von Kielmansegg, the husband of Sophia von Kielmansegg, half-sister to George I he made use of his connections to the royal family to begin work painting snuff boxes for the king. He worked consistently for 20 years for John Hedges, treasurer to Frederick, Prince of Wales whom Goupy went on to paint another set of Raphael Cartoons. On Hedges' death, his brother brought a lawsuit against Goupy by his brother Charles Hedges for failing to repay debts. Goupy claimed the money was for work for Hedges that he delivered. Numerous witnesses were called to testify on the good character of Goupy, including John Wootton and Michael Dahl. It is in this deposition of 1738 that Dahl describes Goupy as 'esteemed the best hand in England at his trade'. Like his uncle Charles and his cousin William, Joseph Goupy is also known to have been 'the most eminent of fan painters'. From 1724 he worked intermittently designing scenery for the theatre. He counted among his numerous artistic friends the sculptor Joseph Nollekens.

In 1726 he was paid £170 to restore elements of Mantegna's Triumphs of Caesar in the Royal Collection. From 1736 he worked as cabinet painter to the Prince of Wales and regularly supplied new pictures and restored paintings to Leicester House up until the prince's death in 1751.

As well as being a subscriber to the Great Queen Street Academy he went on to join the Virtuosi of St. Luke and the later Rose and Crown Club. It was here that he mixed with fellow artists, musicians and collectors including William Hogarth with whom he campaigned successfully for the granting of copyright to the designers of prints in 1735.

Goupy features in Gawen Hamilton's group portrait of a 'club of artists' at the King's Arms. Goupy himself won the portrait in a raffle of April 1735.

Shortly before Prince Frederick's death in 1751, Goupy submitted several designs for buildings at Kew Gardens that were subsequently realized.

Following the prince's death Goupy seems to have retired or severely reduced his artistic output. There are no extant paintings that can be dated after 1751 with limited references to works.

In 1755 his copperplates were sold and in 1765 he sold his collection of paintings in ninety-three lots. In 1765 he exhibited 2 watercolours at the Society of Artists of Great Britain and was elected a fellow although he appears as a non-exhibitor for the next several years.

== Teaching ==
He was also a teacher to an illustrious clientele including Dorothy Boyle, Countess of Burlington, Matthew Robinson, 2nd Baron Rokeby, and Augusta, Princess of Wales. He also had the famous architect Athenian Stuart as a student. It has been suggested his connections to the art world whilst teaching the Mark Catesby could have afforded the naturalist the connections and skills he needed to begin his 'Natural History'. He also gave lessons to his landlady, a Mrs. Dorothy Chambéry with whom he lodged for 17 years.

He was also appointed drawing master to Prince Frederick himself in 1733.

== Association with Handel ==
Goupy's milieu was the artistic world of 18th century London. From 1724 he worked on designing sets with Peter Tillemans at the Haymarket Theatre, and took on the scenery for Handel's Riccardo I three years later. Their careers ran close together for some years. On the death of their m patron George I, their paths diverged, with Handel falling under the patronage of George II, while Goupy moved closer to his son Frederick, Prince of Wales. After the closure of the Royal Academy of Music and Handel's break with other members of the company, especially Paolo Rolli, Goupy went to speak to Rolli's brother to try to mend fences, without success.

The pair were then on good terms, with Goupy painting a portrait of Handel in 1742 for the Prince of Wales. In 1743, however, Goupy was chosen to present a commission to Handel on behalf of the prince's circle of friends, but was apparently rebuffed. Goupy's subsequent insulting painting, a caricature of Handel as a hog surrounded by symbols of gluttony, is now in the Fitzwilliam Museum. Goupy's alignment with Handel's operatic rivals under the patronage of the prince could be another reason for the rift between the two.

At the time of his death, Handel still owned a considerable number of Goupy's paintings and prints.

== Death ==
Goupy died sometime in 1769 'in very indigent circumstances' owing to his care of an old mistress of his, Sarah Wright, 'who became mad [and whom he took] to his own house'. Goupy left an estate in trust to her sister Elizabeth Williams. Additionally he left to different people a 'book of nudities', four flutes, and his painting materials. Posthumous sales of his collection fetched a total of £296 3s 6d.
