= James Figg =

English martial artist (before 1700-1734)

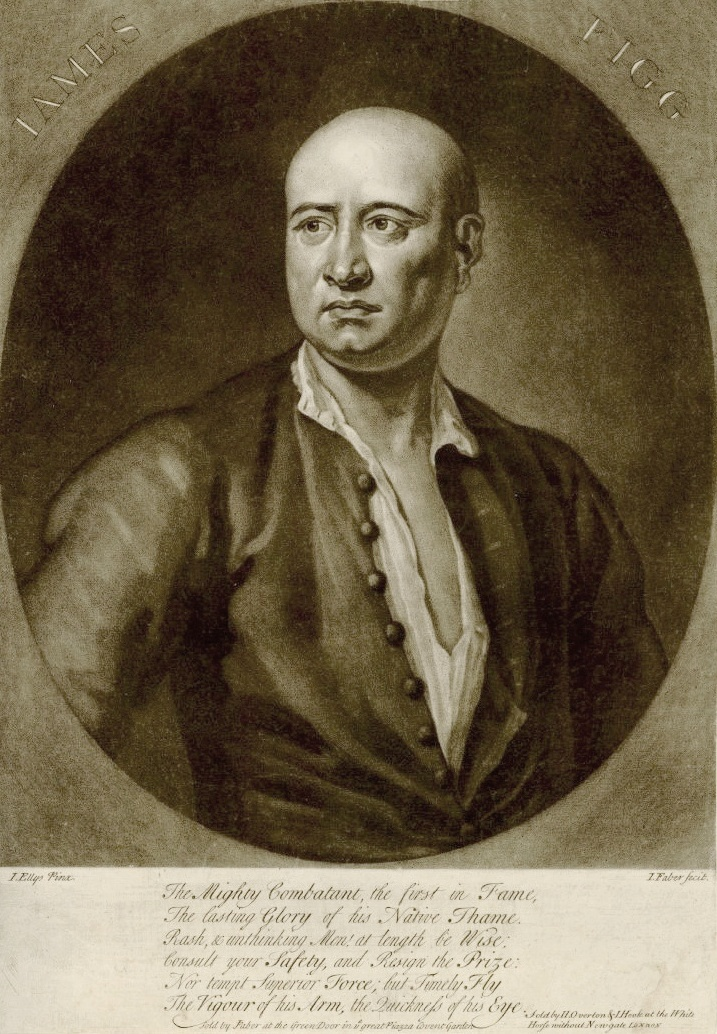
Mezzotint by John Faber, c. 1727–1729 (after a John Ellys portrait)

James Figg (before 1700 (Note: Little is known about Figg's life prior to 1714, including his birth year. Figg's entry in the Oxford Dictionary of National Biography places his birth sometime before 1700. Figg's blue plaque in Thame, Oxfordshire, claims he was born in 1684, while the St Marylebone Parish Church where he is buried claims he was born in 1695.) – 8 December 1734; also spelt James Fig) was an English prizefighter and instructor in historical European martial arts. While Figg primarily fought with weapons including short swords, quarterstaffs, and cudgels, he also played a role in boxing's development. In 1719, he opened a London fighting venue that could seat more than 1,000 spectators and was one of the first of its kind. In 1725, he organised and promoted modern history's first international boxing match at his amphitheatre. He claimed to have won more than 200 matches during his career, and was posthumously considered the first boxing champion.

Little is known about Figg's early life, except that he came to London from Thame, Oxfordshire. In London, Figg gained a reputation as a skilled fighter and set up a business training students in combat with weapons and fists. He promoted fights with both male and female combatants at his venue as well as bouts of animal blood sport. He also set up outdoor boxing booths and rings in fields, parks, and fairs around London. By the end of his career in the early 1730s, Figg had fought in front of European royalty, including George, Prince of Wales, and the future Holy Roman Emperor Francis I, as well as aristocrats, politicians, writers, artists, and actors, and was one of the better-known personages in London. Among depictions of Figg in art and literature, art historians most discuss him for his friendship with William Hogarth and his appearance in several of the artist's paintings and engravings.

== Early life ==
James Figg was born in Thame, Oxfordshire, sometime before 1700, though various sources dispute the exact year. He was also possibly born in Priestend, to Francis and Elizabeth Figg, as one of their seven children. Little is certain about his early life before 1714, by which time he was a student of the defence instructor Timothy Buck of Clare Market.

== Fighting career ==
In 1719, Figg opened an amphitheatre and fighting school in London adjoining the City of Oxford tavern in Oxford Road, Marylebone, where he taught bare-knuckle boxing, fencing, quarterstaff, and cudgel combat. While boxing had existed for decades, and a fenced enclosure existed in Hyde Park for practitioners of historical European martial arts, Figg may have been one of the first people to turn combat sport into a business. His venture was one of the earliest and most noted indoor fighting venues of its time. His students included early professional prizefighters such as William Flanders, William Gill, and Thomas Sibblis, as well as men of the gentry and nobility. Figg was also a fight promoter and hosted matches fought by both male and female combatants such as Thomas Allen, John Gretton, Bob Whitaker, and Elizabeth Wilkinson, as well as bouts of animal blood sport, including bear-baiting and tiger-baiting.

Though Figg posthumously gained a reputation as a boxing pioneer, he primarily fought with weapons such as short swords, quarterstaffs, and cudgels. The only known occasions on which Figg fought public boxing matches were at the Southwark Fair where he would fight fair-goers, though he also set up fighting booths and rings in fields and parks including Smithfield, Moorfields, St George's Fields, and Hyde Park. However, Figg organised and promoted the first international boxing match in modern history. On 20 January 1725, Figg arranged a match between Venetian gondolier Alberto di Carni and English drover Bob Whitaker. George, Prince of Wales, watched the fight from a specially constructed royal box.

Figg fought semi-regular matches with recurring opponents, a common practice among prizefighters at the time. For example, he fought a man named Rowland Bennet on at least 23 occasions over the course of his career, and in 1730, Figg reportedly fought another man three times in two months. He also fought matches in which he and another weapons master would face off against another pair of fighters.

Figg's greatest rival may have been Edward "Ned" Sutton, a tobacco pipe maker of Gravesend, against whom he fought a series of heavily publicised matches, including one in which Figg suffered his only recorded defeat, having taken a wound in the belly and being "cloven in the foot". In 1725, the poet John Byrom visited Figg's amphitheatre where he saw Figg fight Sutton. He reported: "Figg had a wound and bled pretty much; Sutton had a blow with a quarterstaff just upon his knee, which made him lame, so then they gave over". On 6 June 1727, Figg defeated Sutton at the former's amphitheatre before an audience of approximately 1,000 spectators, including Prime Minister Robert Walpole, Poet Laureate Colley Cibber, and satirist Jonathan Swift.

In October 1730, the Ipswich Journal reported: "the invincible Mr. James Figg fought at his Amphitheatre Mr. Holmes, an Irishman, who keeps an Inn at Yaul near Waterford in Ireland, and came into England on purpose to fight this English Champion". It was reported that during the bout, Holmes had his wrist cut to the bone and was therefore forced to retire. It was stated that this fight was the 271st contest Figg fought without defeat.

== Later life and death ==
After 1730, Figg largely gave up serious fighting, though he fought exhibition matches with Jack Broughton. In December 1731, he also won a sword fight against John Sparks at the Little Theatre in Haymarket, which was attended by foreign dignitaries including the Duke of Lorraine and Count Kinsky.

In June 1731, Figg began teaching at new premises in Poland Street, and his student Thomas Sibblis took over the Oxford Road amphitheatre.

Figg died on 8 December 1734 and was buried in the churchyard of St Marylebone on 12 December. Little is known of his family except that his wife gave birth to a son the day after Figg's funeral. His former student George Taylor took over Figg's business after his death.

== Legacy ==
By the end of his career, Figg was a recognisable and famous person in London. Royalty, aristocrats, politicians, writers, artists, and actors attended his fights, and in autumn 1729, Figg was made gate-keeper to upper St James's Park by the Earl of Essex. He appeared in the writings of John Byrom, Henry Fielding, and Alexander Pope, and his portrait was sketched and painted by artists John Ellys and Jonathan Richardson.

Artist William Hogarth was also a friend and admirer of Figg, who appears in several of the former's paintings, including Southwark Fair, in which he brandishes a sword on horseback, and in The Levée, the second entry in the series A Rake's Progress, in which he stands among the rake's tutors, holding quarterstaffs. Figg may also feature in A Midnight Modern Conversation, though Hogarth captioned the picture: "Think not to find one meant resemblance there, we lash the Vices but the Persons spare". Hogarth's painting The Pugilist was long attributed as a portrait of Jack Broughton, but Hogarth scholar Elizabeth Einberg and boxing historian Tony Gee have both claimed that it is probably of Figg.

Figg was inducted into the International Boxing Hall of Fame in 1992 and the Bare Knuckle Boxing Hall of Fame in 2010. A blue plaque dedicated to him was unveiled at The James Figg Pub (formerly The Greyhound Inn), Cornmarket, Thame, on 14 April 2011.

=== In art ===
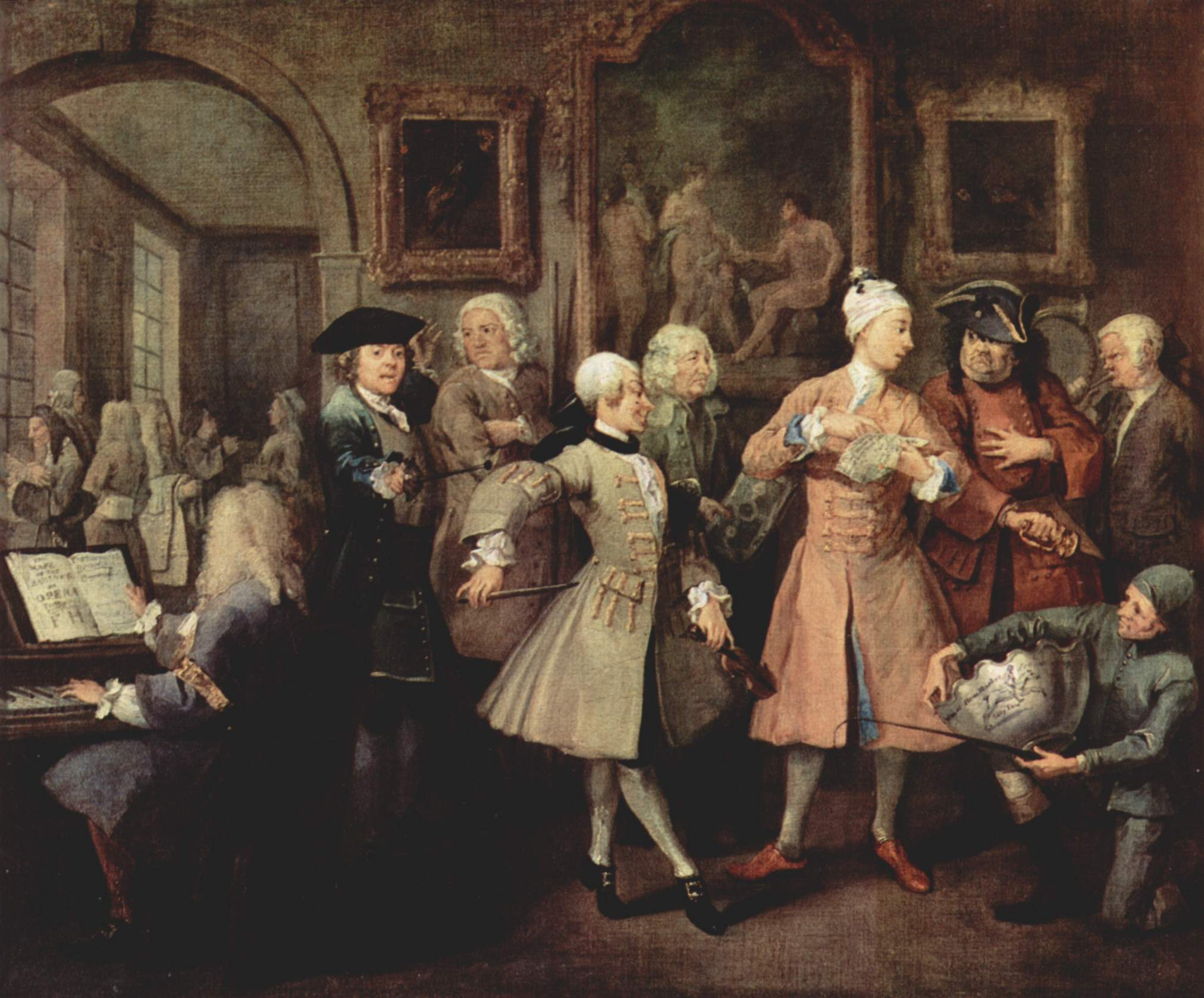
A Rake's Progress: II – The Levée by William Hogarth, c. 1732–1734; Figg stands third from the left, between the fencing master and the dance instructor, wearing a white wig and holding two quarterstaffs.

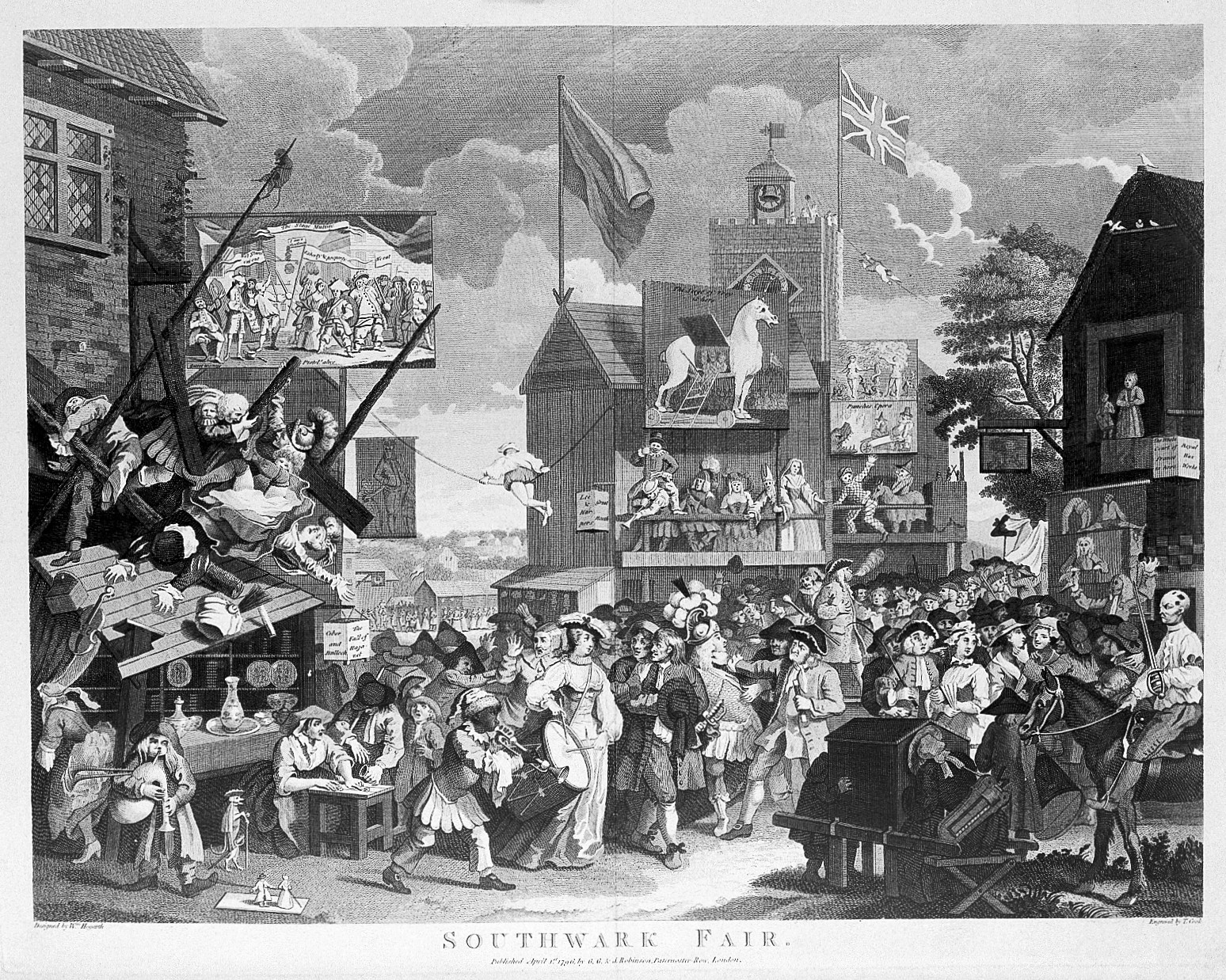
Southwark Fair by William Hogarth, c. 1733–1734; Figg features as the mounted swordsman in the bottom right corner.

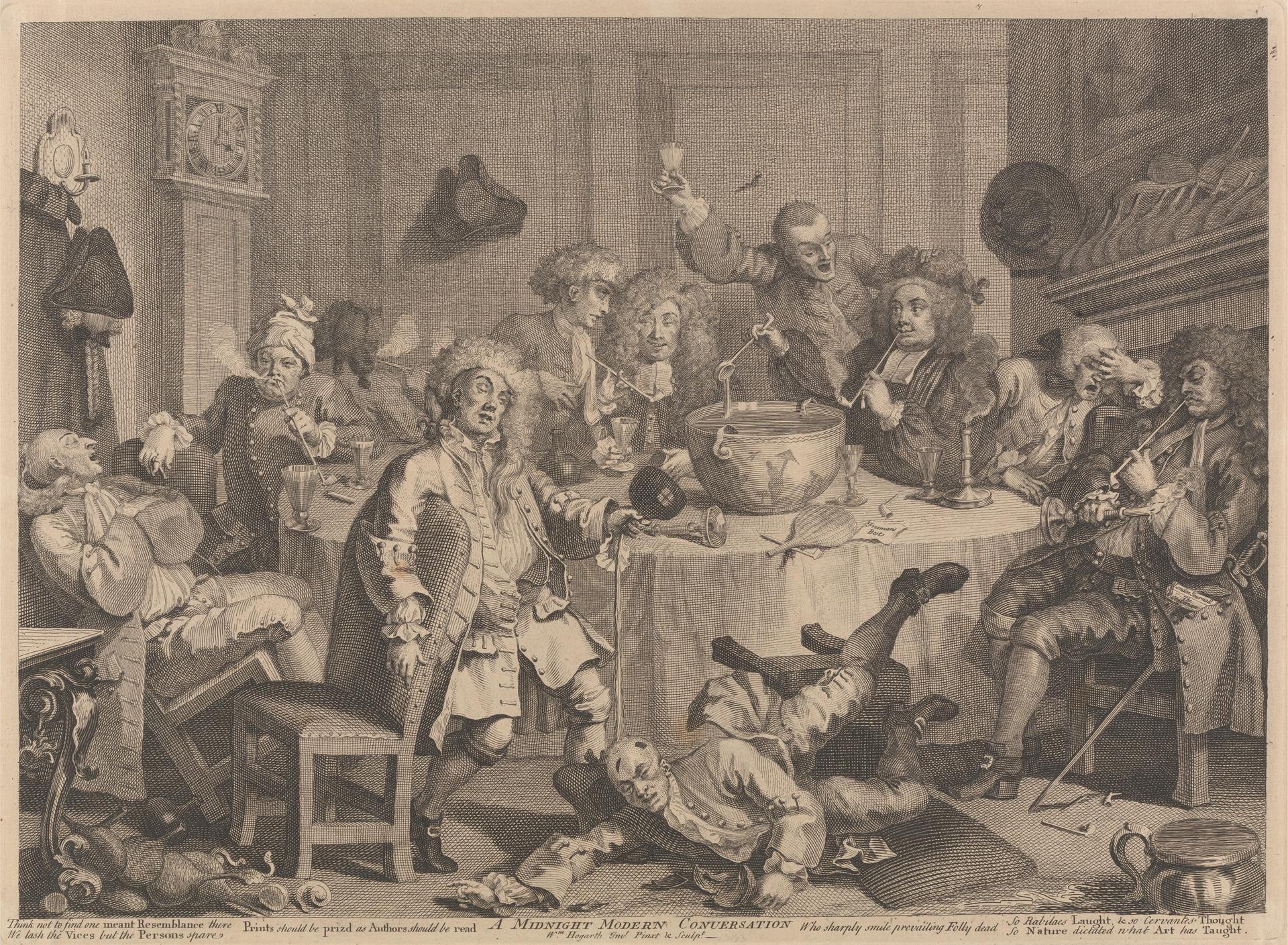
A Midnight Modern Conversation by William Hogarth, c. 1733; Figg may be the bald man lying on the floor in bottom-center.

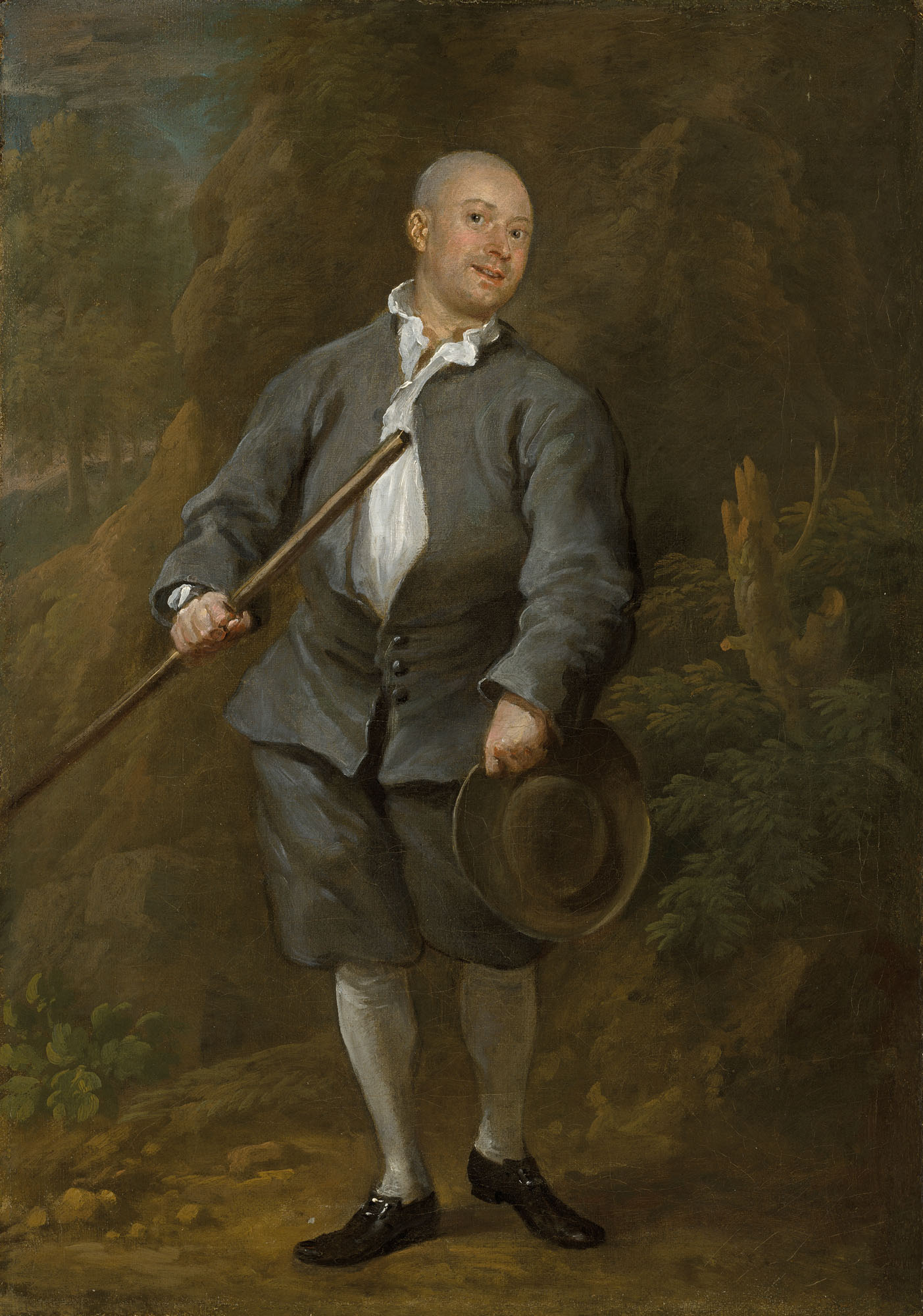
The Pugilist by William Hogarth may be a portrait of either Figg or Jack Broughton.

== Notes and references ==
=== Sources ===
==== Books ====
- Birley, Derek (1993). Sport and the Making of Britain. Manchester University Press. ISBN 0-7190-3759-X.
- Byrom, John (1854). The Private Journal and Literary Remains of John Byrom: Vol. I, part I. Manchester: Chetham Society.
- Egan, Pierce (1829). Boxiana: or, Sketches of Ancient and Modern Pugilism. London: George Virtue. hdl:2027/njp.32101072325507.
- Fielding, Henry (1993). Goldgar, Bertrand A.; Amory, Hugh (eds.). Miscellanies by Henry Fielding, Esq. Vol. 2. Wesleyan University Press. ISBN 9780198185123.
- Gee, Tony (2004). "Figg, James (b. before 1700, d. 1734), prize-fighter". Oxford Dictionary of National Biography (online ed.). Oxford University Press. doi:10.1093/ref:odnb/9417. ISBN 978-0-19-861412-8. (Subscription, Wikipedia Library access or UK public library membership required.)
- Miles, Henry Downes (1906). Pugilistica: The History of British Boxing Containing Lives of the Most Celebrated Pugilists. Vol. 1. Edinburgh: J. Grant.
- Wheatley, Henry Benjamin (1909). Hogarth's London: Pictures of the Manners of the Eighteenth Century. New York: E.P. Dutton.
- Wheatley, Henry Benjamin; Cunningham, Peter (2011). London Past and Present: Its History, Associations, and Traditions. Cambridge: Cambridge University Press. ISBN 9781108028073.

==== Journals ====
- Borg, Alan (2004). "The Monarch of Marylebone Plains: James Figg's Place in 18th-Century British Art". The British Art Journal. 5 (3): 35–36. JSTOR 41614575.
- Brailsford, Dennis (1982). "Sporting Days in Eighteenth Century England". Journal of Sport History. 9 (3): 41–54. JSTOR 43609260.
- Johnson, Christopher (1996). "'British Championism': Early Pugilism and the Works of Fielding". The Review of English Studies. 47 (187): 331–351. doi:10.1093/res/XLVII.187.331. JSTOR 518283.
- Roberts, Randy (1977). "Eighteenth Century Boxing". Journal of Sport History. 4 (3): 246–259. JSTOR 43610520.

This article incorporates text from a publication now in the public domain: "Figg, James". Dictionary of National Biography. London: Smith, Elder & Co. 1885–1900.
