= Jack Broughton =

English bare-knuckle boxer (c. 1703–1789)

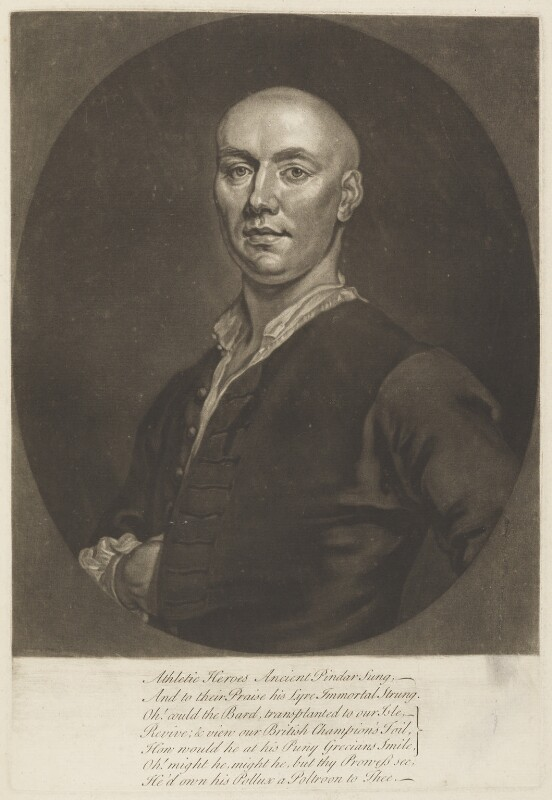
Mezzotint by an unknown artist, c. 1725–1750

John Broughton (c. 1703 – 8 January 1789) was an English bare-knuckle boxer. He was the first person to codify a set of boxing rules; prior to this the "rules" that existed were very loosely defined and tended to vary from contest to contest. His seven rules were widely used in boxing for nearly a century, until they were replaced by the London Prize Ring rules in 1838. Pierce Egan characterised Broughton as the "Father of the English School of Boxing".

== Early life ==
John Broughton was born c. 1703 to unknown parents, possibly in London, though one early-20th-century history of boxing claims that he was a farmer's son from Baunton, Gloucestershire. Apprentice records show that Broughton was apprenticed to a Thames waterman in May 1723. On 1 August 1730, Broughton won the annual Doggett's Coat and Badge rowing race among watermen who had completed their apprenticeship within the previous year. At the time, he was noted as working on the shore near Hungerford Market in London.

As an adult, Broughton stood 180 centimetres (5 feet 11 inches) and weighed 14 stone (200 pounds). His first fights may have been against other watermen in London, with one story claiming that he beat another man following a dispute. A promotion for one of Broughton's fights in 1750 claimed that he had gone undefeated for 24 years, placing his first fights c. 1726.

== Fighting career ==
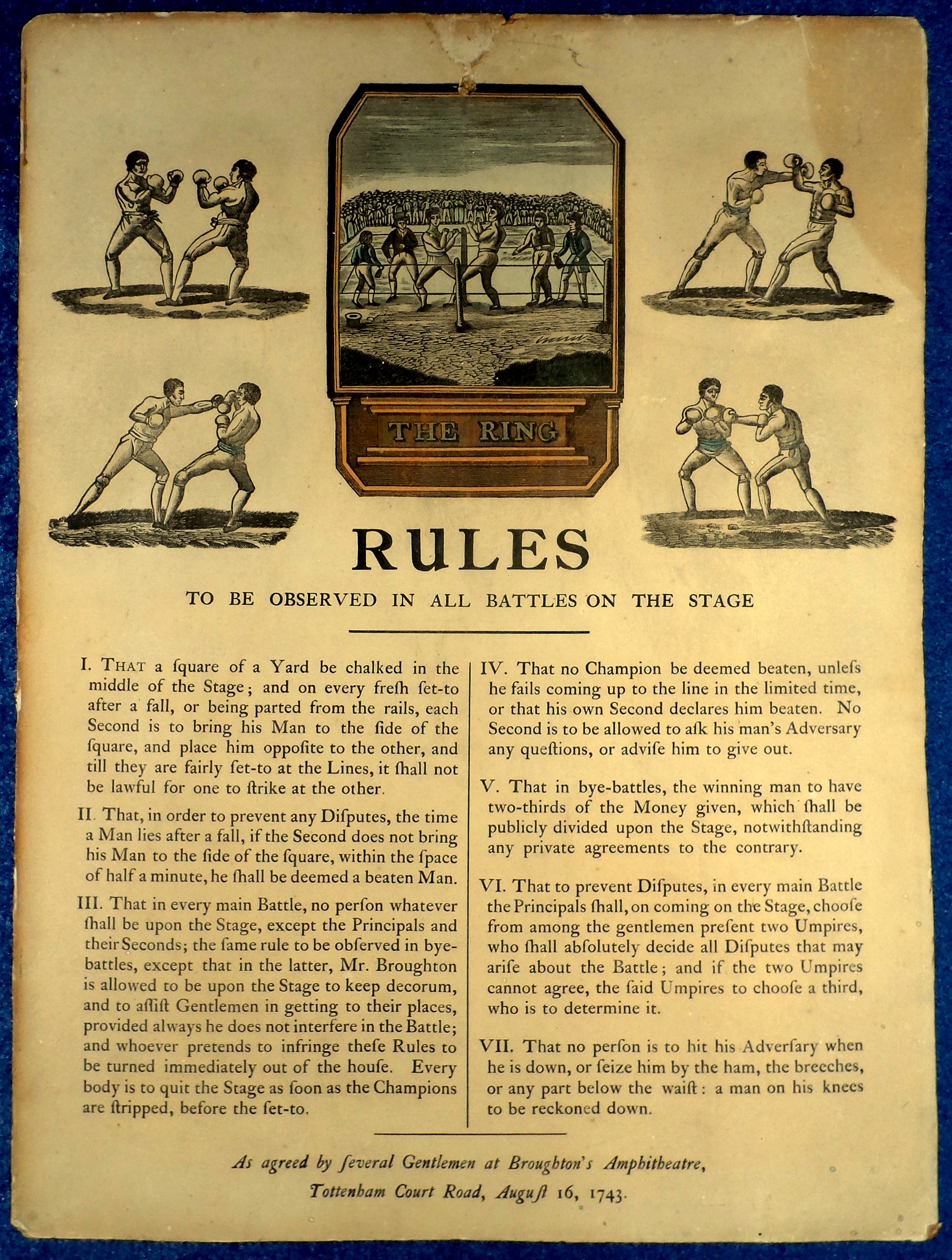
Broughton's seven rules from 16 August 1743

By 1730, Broughton was competing in professional prizefights advertised in London newspapers. He frequently appeared as a fighter at the amphitheatres of Thomas Sibblis, who had taken over James Figg's venue in 1731, and James Stokes. He fought semi-regular matches with recurring opponents, such as a series of four fights against pipe-maker Thomas Allen between 1730 and 1734 and three matches against coachman George Stephenson starting in 1738, one of which Paul Whitehead satirised in his 1744 mock-epic poem "The Gymnasiad".

Broughton opened an amphitheatre in Oxford Road and began staging fights on 13 March 1743, when, for an entrance fee of a shilling or less, patrons were able to watch a display of boxing between several competitors. Broughton envisaged a venue in which boxing matches as well as fights with weapons such as short swords, quarterstaffs, and cudgels would only take place between skilled combatants, although he also hosted bouts of animal blood sport, including bear-baiting. On 16 August 1743, he drew up the first standard set of rules for the sport, stipulating that a round would last until a fighter went down with a 30-second interval between rounds. The rules were applied widely in boxing until they were replaced by the London Prize Ring rules in 1838.

Broughton was a King's Body Guard of the Yeoman of the Guard and probably accompanied George II to Hanover in 1743 during the War of the Austrian Succession.

In 1747, Broughton opened a school in Haymarket where men could learn boxing while wearing an early form of boxing glove called "mufflers" to protect against injury, possibly making the activity more attractive to wealthy customers. Some historians credit Broughton as the inventor of boxing gloves because of his use of mufflers, though their use in professional bouts would not become widespread until the late 19th century.

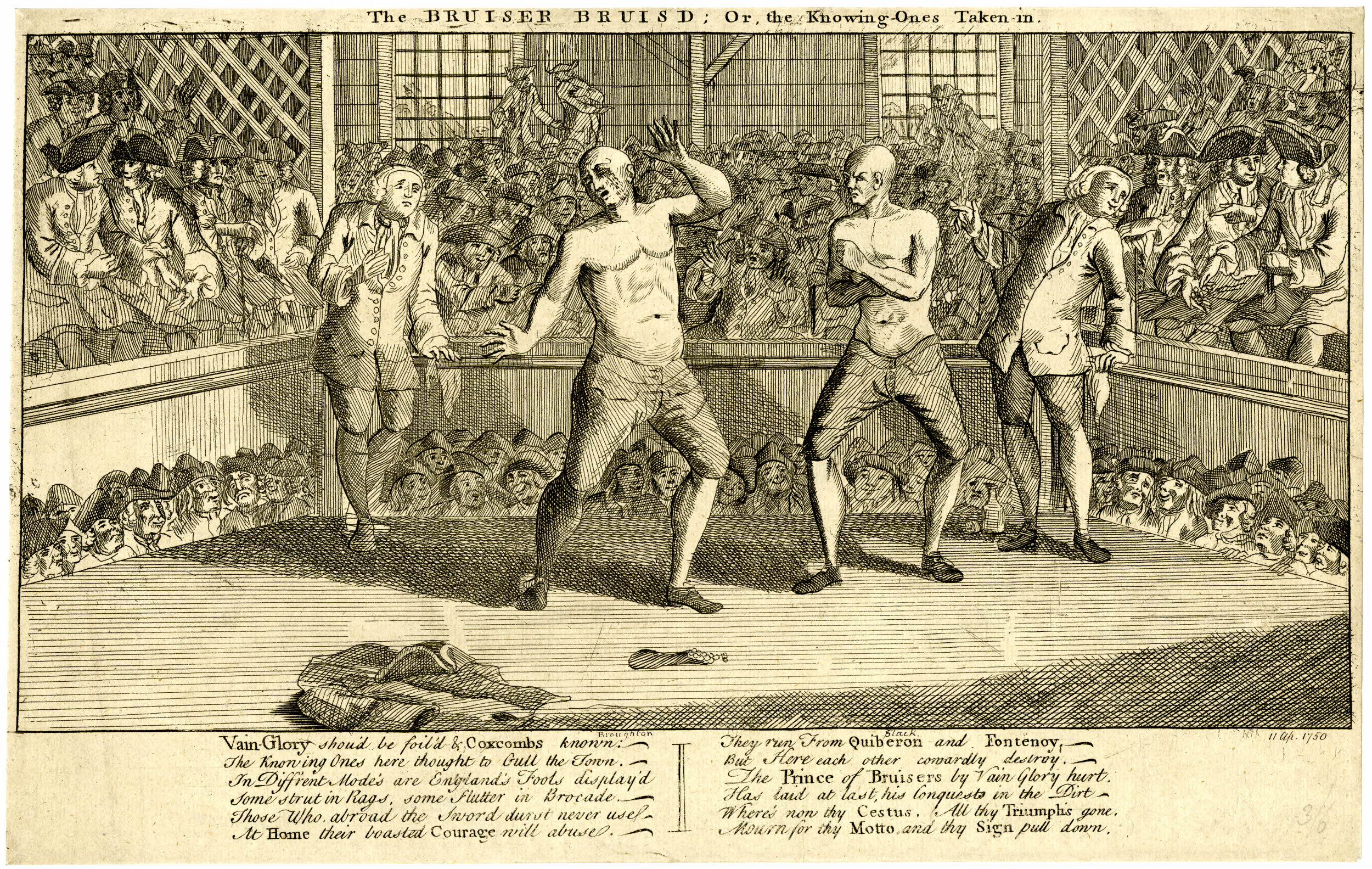
The Bruiser Bruisd; Or, the Knowing Ones Taken-in. A boxing match between John Broughton and Jack Slack

On 11 April 1750, Broughton fought Jack Slack, a Norfolk butcher, following a personal dispute between the men. Two minutes into the fight, Slack threw a blinding punch, and after 14 minutes Broughton retired from the bout because he was unable to see. The Duke of Cumberland, Broughton's patron at the time was said to have lost £10,000 on the match. Broughton permanently retired from boxing following his defeat, though he continued to operate his amphitheatre until 1753 or 1754, after which he ran an antiques business.

== Later life and death ==
Broughton continued to teach boxing until 1787, when he was in his eighties. He was married to a woman named Elizabeth, who was approximately 20 years his junior.

In December 1768, Broughton was involved in hiring ruffians to be sent to Brentford on behalf of Sir William Beauchamp-Proctor, who was standing for parliament. A riot broke out on 8 December, though it is uncertain whether the gang Broughton hired was intended to incite the riot or preserve order. Two men, one of whom was hired by Broughton, were subsequently found guilty of murder, though both were later granted a reprieve.

He died on 8 January 1789 at his house at Walcot Place, Lambeth, and left a sum of £7,000 to his niece. He was interred at Westminster Abbey and requested to have the epitaph "Champion of England" carved on his headstone, but the dean of the church objected, and left a blank space. In 1988, Broughton's request was fulfilled with the qualification "Pugilist" also added to the line.

== Legacy ==
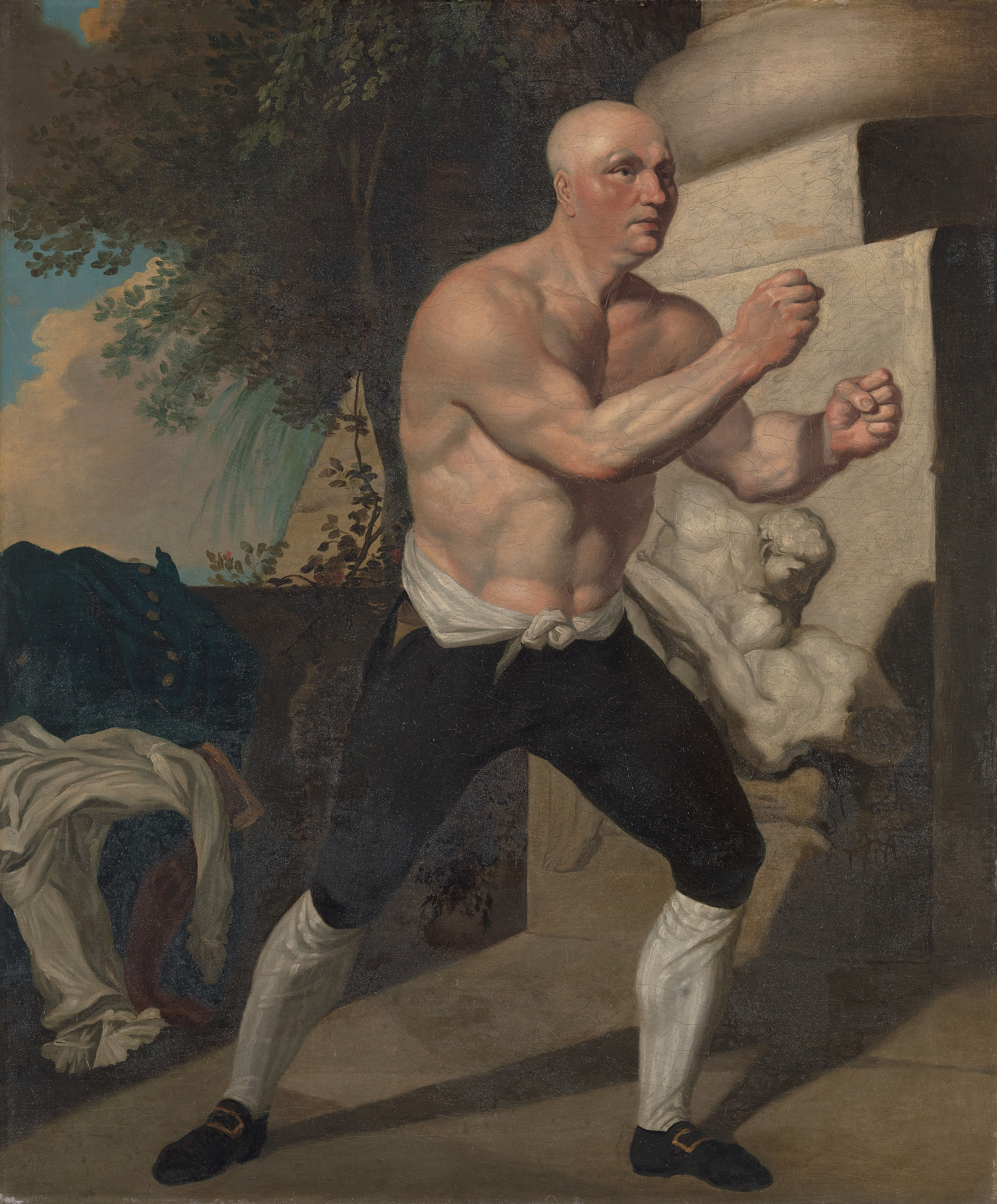
Portrait by John Hamilton Mortimer, c. 1767

Broughton appeared in 18th century art and literature. He was the subject of portraits by John Ellys and John Hamilton Mortimer, and also served as a model for John Michael Rysbrack's statue of Hercules. In literature, Paul Whitehead satirised one of Broughton's bouts against George Stephenson in the 1744 mock-epic poem "The Gymnasiad", and William Hazlitt's 1822 essay "The Fight" references one of the fights between Broughton and Stephenson. Henry Fielding also alluded to Broughton's boxing academy and lampooned the invention of "muffler" boxing gloves in several of his writings, including the 1749 novel The History of Tom Jones, a Foundling.

Broughton was one of the original inductees of the International Boxing Hall of Fame, inducted as a pioneer of the sport.
