= Louis Chéron =

French painter (1660–1725)

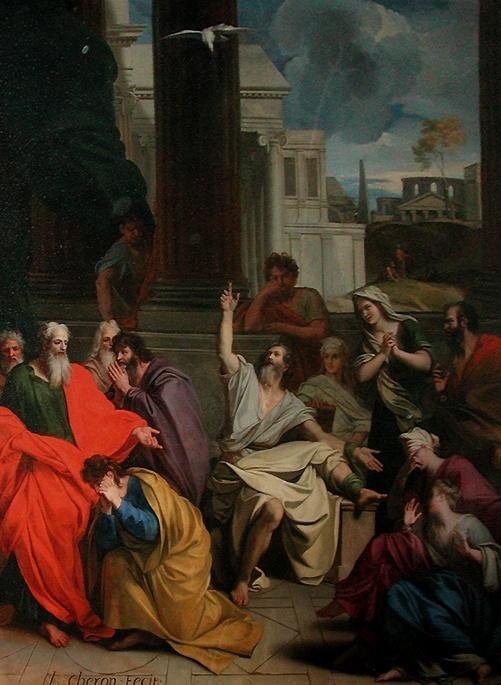
The Prophecy of Agabus by Louis Cheron (1687)

Louis Chéron (French pronunciation: [lwi ʃeʁɔ̃]; 2 September 1660 – 26 May 1725) was a French painter, illustrator and art tutor.

== Life ==
Chéron was born in Paris, into a French Protestant family of artists (his father being the miniaturist and engraver Henri Chéron and his elder sister the painter and engraver Elizabeth-Sophie Chéron). He trained under his father then at the Académie Royale de Peinture et de Sculpture. On the trips to Rome occasioned by his first winning of the Académie's prix de Rome in 1676 (he won again in 1678), he studied Raphael and Giulio Romano.

He returned to France, winning several commissions but in the wake of the persecutions after the edict of Nantes's revocation in 1685 he decided to leave France (possibly encouraged by Ralph Montagu, later one of his patrons), showing up in the registers of the Huguenot congregation at the Savoy Chapel in London in 1693. He was made a naturalised Briton in 1710, worked on Montague House (1706–1712), Burghley House and Chatsworth House and was one of five artists who submitted drawings for St Paul's Cathedral's dome. He also produced engraved images with James Thornhill.

In 1718, Chéron and John Vanderbank split from Godfrey Kneller's Great Queen Street Academy (where they were both teaching) to form their own St. Martin's Lane Academy. Chéron died in London in 1725 and was buried at St Paul's, Covent Garden.

== Sources ==
- Cast, David (2004). "Chéron, Louis". In Matthew, H. C. G. & Harrison, Brian (eds.). Oxford Dictionary of National Biography. Vol. 11. Oxford, New York: Oxford University Press. pp. 310–311. ISBN 0-19-861361-X. OCLC 1035756854 – via the Internet Archive.
