= Conversation piece =

Painting genre

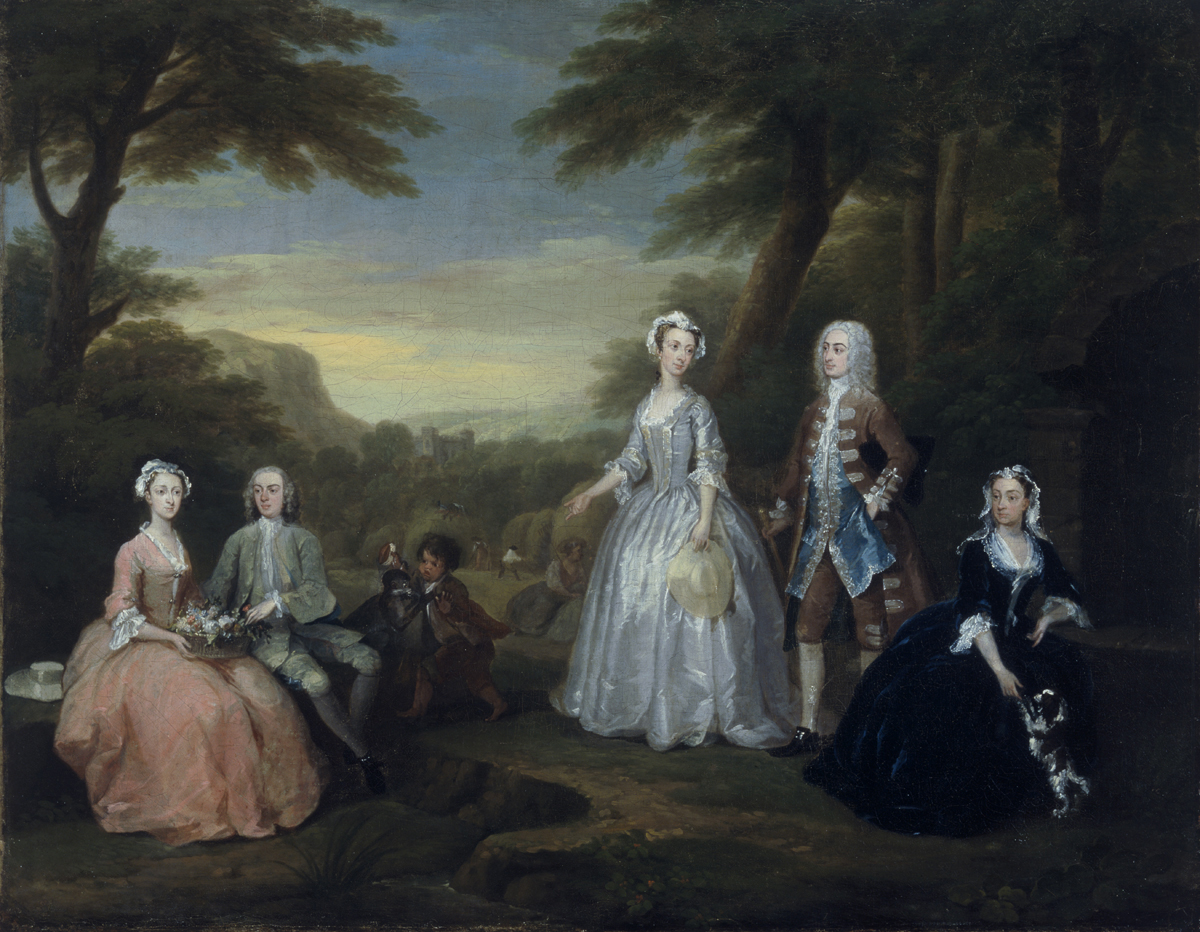
The Jones Family Conversation Piece, by William Hogarth, 1730.

A conversation piece refers to a group portrait in a domestic or landscape setting depicting persons chatting or otherwise socializing with each other. The persons depicted may be members of a family as well as friends, members of a society or hunt, or some other grouping who are shown sharing common activities such as hunts, meals, or musical parties. It was an especially popular genre in 18th-century England, beginning from the 1720s, largely due to the influence of William Hogarth. Similar paintings can also be found in other periods and outside of England. The setting of various figures "conversing" in an intimate setting appears to call for small-scale paintings, but some artists treated this subject matter in the grand manner, with almost life-size figures.

== Term and origins ==
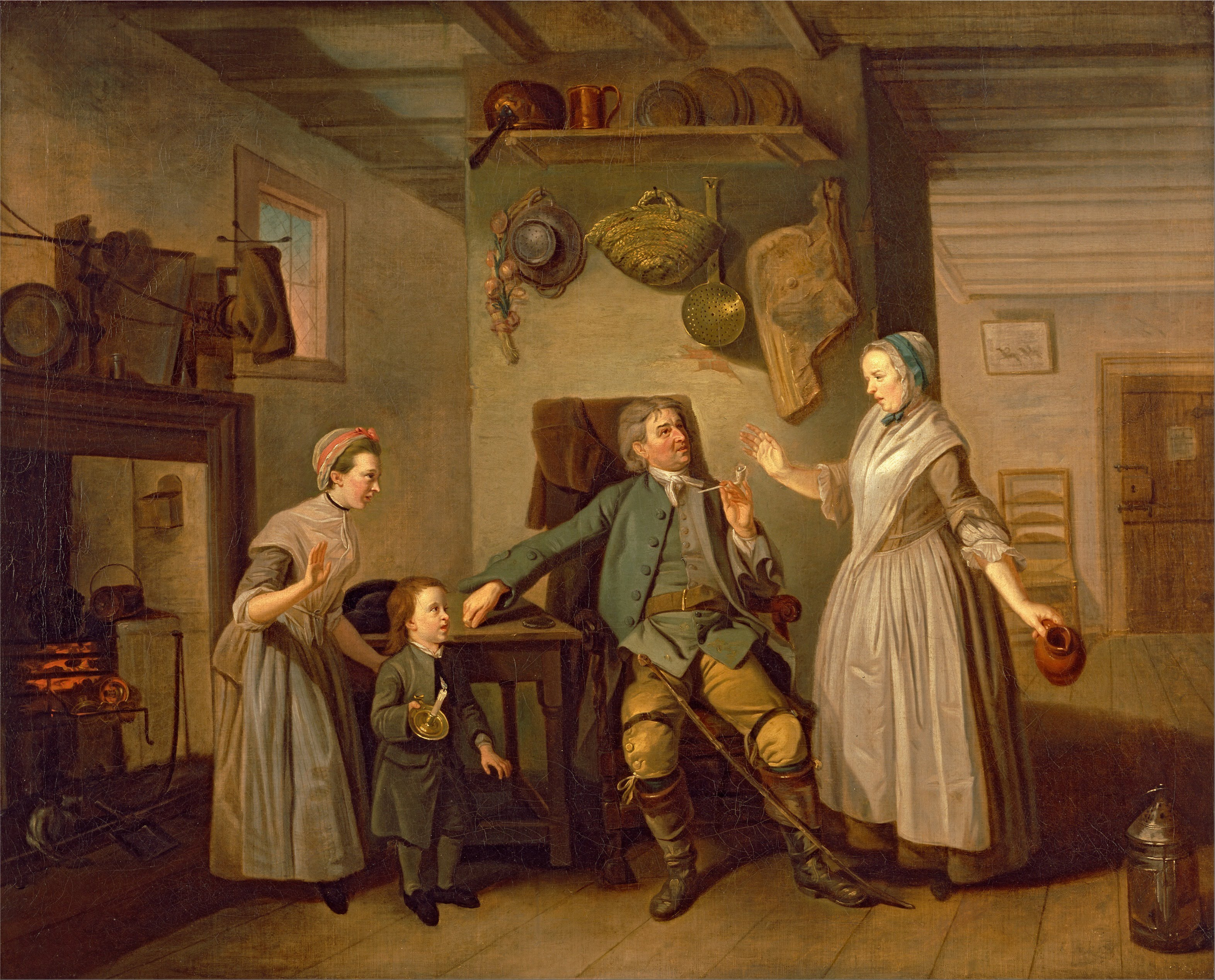
David Garrick and Mary Bradshaw in David Garrick's "The Farmer's Return" by Johann Zoffany, 1762.

The term derives from the Latin word 'conversatio' and was related to the French 'conversation', the Italian 'conversazione' and the Flemish/Dutch 'conversatie'. In the 17th century Habsburg Netherlands 'conversatie' described paintings of informal groups. In 1629 Rubens referred to a group of women as a 'conversatie van jouffrouwen' ('conversation of ladies', also known as conversatie à la mode and The Garden of Love (Prado)). In 1670s Antwerp the low-life genre scenes of Adriaen Brouwer and Joos van Craesbeeck as well as the more elegant dance and social gatherings by Hieronymus Janssens and Christoffel Jacobsz van der Laemen were referred to as 'conversaties' and 'conversations'. In England the term 'conversation' or 'conversation piece' was first used at the end of the 17th century to describe unpretentious narrative or anecdotal pictures in the Flemish/Dutch style. Somewhat later it was also used for Antoine Watteau's fêtes galantes. Only in 1730 it was used in England for the type of small-scale intimate portrait paintings painted by British painters such as Gawen Hamilton.

The conversation piece's primary characteristic of representing a private interaction were already present in 15th-century paintings such as Jan van Eyck's Arnolfini Portrait (1434) and Andrea Mantegna's Lodovico Gonzaga with his Family (1471). The genre developed from 17th century portraiture in the Low Countries. The compositions of merrymaking companies (vrolijk gezelschap) and garden parties (buitenpartij) painted by artists such as Dirck Hals, David Vinckbooms, Adriaen van de Venne and Willem Buytewech were an important influence on the genre. In addition, representations of elegant companies and balls by Hieronymus Janssens and the works of Peter Paul Rubens, in particular his Garden of Love (Prado Museum), gave an impetus and direction to the development of the genre. In this last work, Rubens showed how a garden could be used as a setting for amorous dalliance and courtship. More informal forms of portraiture developed showing the sitters in an intimate environment evoking new social ideals of friendship and marriage. Flemish and Dutch painters active in the mid 17th century started to paint families and friends at home in small-scale paintings such as David Teniers the Younger, Gonzales Coques, Gerard ter Borch, Gabriel Metsu, Caspar Netscher and Jacob Ochtervelt.

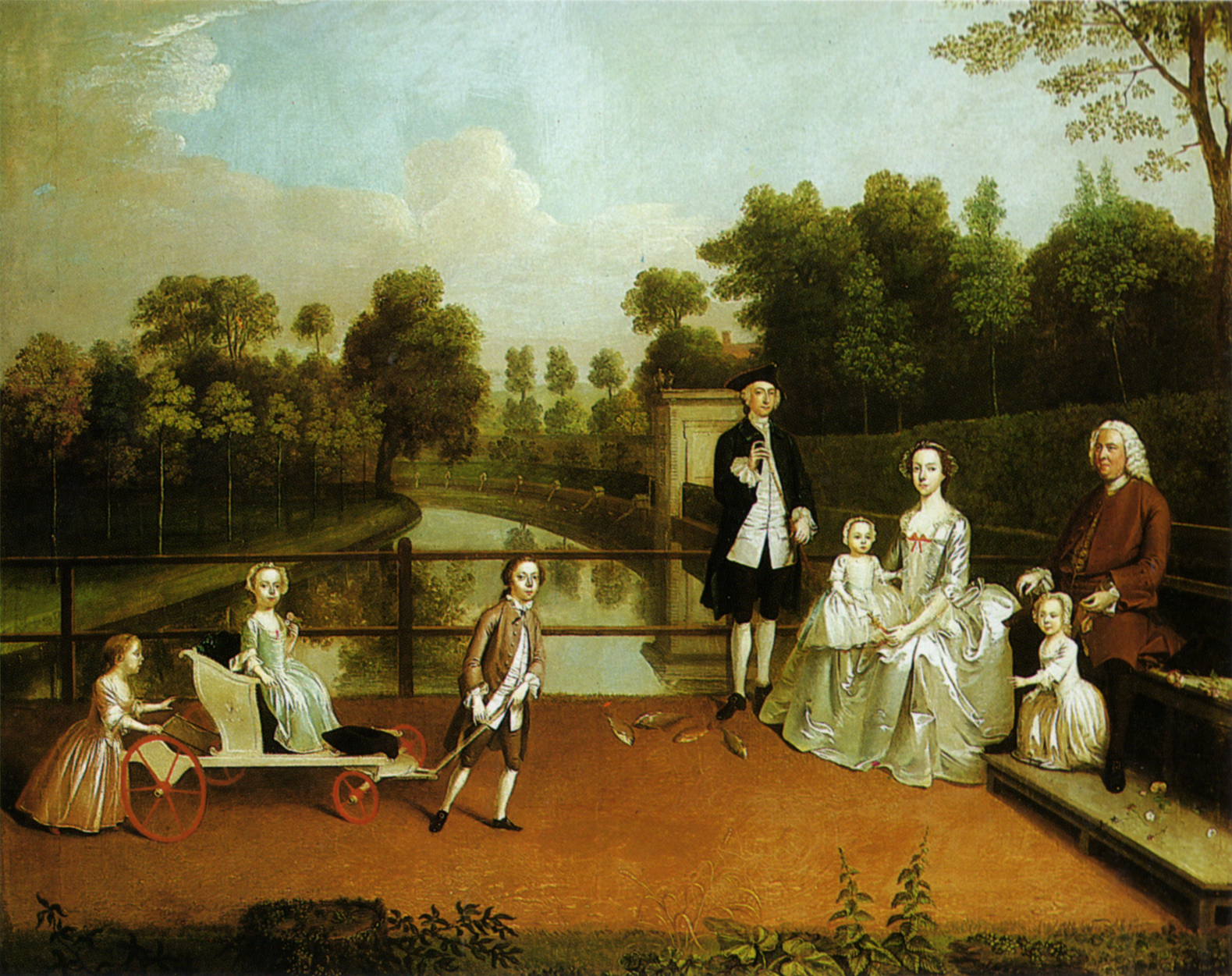
Family Group in a Garden by Arthur Devis, 1749.

== Development of the genre in England ==
The 'conversation piece' started with families and friends depicted on a small scale in intimate settings. People were portrayed sharing common activities such as hunts, meals, or musical parties. Dogs and/or horses are also frequently featured. Arthur Devis was a regional painter famous for his small conversation pieces, popular with the gentry of Cheshire. William Hogarth also worked in the genre, and parodied it in his print A Midnight Modern Conversation, which depicted a group of men whose conversation has degenerated into drunken incoherence. Johann Zoffany specialized in complicated conversation pieces, and most portraits by George Stubbs take this form, with horses and carriages in the composition. Joshua Reynolds would on request produce conversation pieces in the Grand Manner, and at his usual near-life scale.
