= George Vertue =

English engraver and antiquary

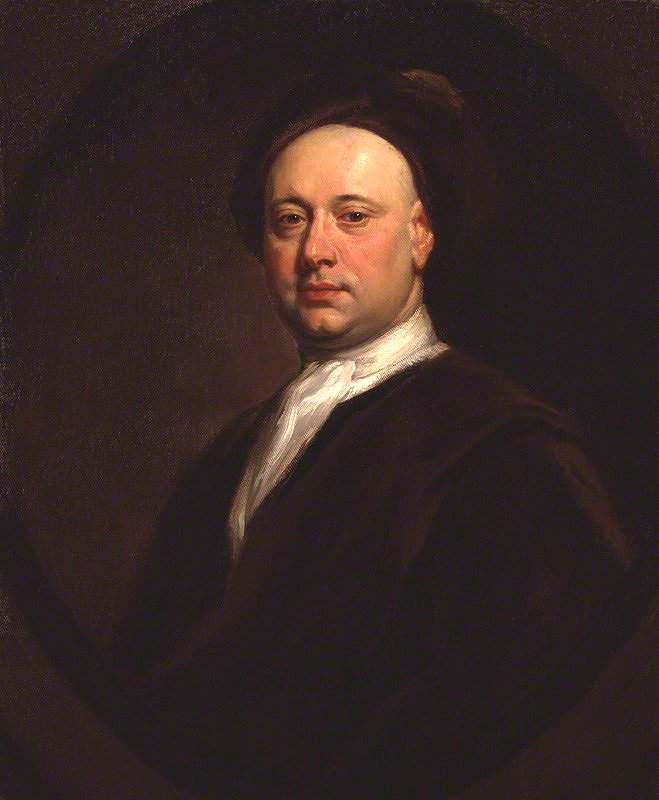
1733 portrait of Vertue by Jonathan Richardson

George Vertue (1684 – 24 July 1756) was an English engraver and antiquary, whose notebooks on British art of the first half of the 18th century are a valuable source for the period.

== Life ==
Vertue was born in 1684 in St Martin-in-the-Fields, London, his father, perhaps a tailor, and mother are noted as "Roman Catholic". At the age of 13, he was apprenticed to a prominent heraldic engraver of French origin who became bankrupt and returned to France. Vertue worked seven years under Michael Vandergucht, before operating independently. He was amongst the first members of Godfrey Kneller's London Academy of Painting, who had employed him to engrave portraits. It was there that he became a pupil of Thomas Gibson, a leading portrait painter.

Vertue had a deep interest in antiquarian research, and much of his labour was given to this subject. From 1713 on, Vertue was a keen researcher on details of the history of British art, accumulating about forty volumes of notebooks. He was a member of the Rose and Crown Club, with William Hogarth, Peter Tillemans and other artists and connoisseurs, and kept some records of it. His travels to sites across England, with enthusiasts such as Edward Harley (Earl of Oxford), Lord Coleraine and others, were recorded in Vertue's highly detailed drawings and notes. In 1717 he was appointed official engraver to the Society of Antiquaries, the same year as its formal foundation, and the only engraver to be made a Fellow of the Society (FSA). Most of the illustrations in Vetusta Monumenta, up to his date of death, are his work.

After the death of the Earl of Oxford in 1741, Vertue was patronised by the Duchess of Portland and others. The Duke of Norfolk commissioned a work after Van Dyck of the Earl of Arundel and his family. He produced a catalogue detailing the collections of the royal family, at the request of Frederick, Prince of Wales, an avid buyer of the engraver's work.

A portrait of Vertue was painted in 1715 by Gibson, his widow donated this to the Society of Antiquaries; Vertue had produced an engraving of this. A later painting, of the artist aged around 50, by Jonathan Richardson was acquired by the National Portrait Gallery, a plate of this by Thomas Chambers was engraved for Walpole's Anecdotes. An 1849 edition of Walpole's book contained an engraving, by George Thomas Doo, of a self-portrait—sitting in a library—that shows him displaying a portrait of the Earl of Oxford; this was previously published in 1821 as a lithograph. Another self-portrait, with his wife on their wedding-day, was etched by William Humphrey. Richardson also drew the profile used in James Basire's plate in Nichols's Literary Anecdotes.

Vertue died in London on 24 July 1756 and was buried in Westminster Abbey.

Vertue's brother James (died 1765) was an artist in Bath who produced the interior view of the abbey that was engraved by him. The second of his three brothers, Peter, was a dancing master of Chelmsford.

== Works ==
Approximately five hundred portraits are attributed to Vertue, a similar number of published plates were devoted to antiquarian subjects. Many of the portraits were printed as frontispieces, most are regarded as accurate representations of the subject and many are not without artistic merit.

Vertue's works of portraiture include:

- A portrait of Archbishop Tillotson, after Kneller, commissioned by John Somers, 1st Baron Somers
- The head of George I of Great Britain, produced on his accession to the throne, a work that established his reputation.
- Twelve Heads of Poets, set of plates issued 1730
- Rapin's History of England, Knapton Brothers edition, 1736. A task that took three years. The same publisher commissioned plates for Thomas Birch's Heads of Illustrious Persons, though his contribution is submerged by the popularity of Houbraken's "brilliant but less truthful productions".

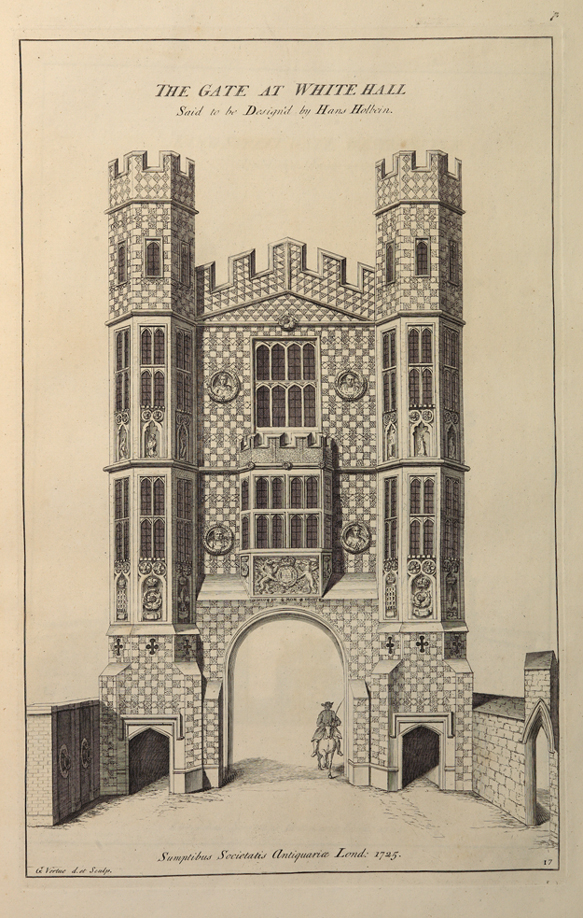
The Gate at Whitehall (Holbein Gate) in Vetusta Monumenta Vol.1, 1747 (1826).

As official engraver to the Society of Antiquaries, with works relating to this field of natural history, Vertue was prolific: Richard II at Westminster; a view of Waltham Cross; the shrine of Edward the Confessor; are notable mentions from his works in Vetusta Monumenta

He executed a series of nine Historic Prints in 1740, imitations of works from the Tudor period, these included Visit of Queen Elizabeth to Blackfriars (miscalled the Procession to Hunsdon House); Henry VII and his Queen, with Henry VIII and Jane Seymour; The Cenotaph of Lord Darnley; and Edward VI granting a Charter to Bridewell Hospital. The copperplates of these were acquired by the Society of Antiquaries, and reprinted in 1776.

His publications include A Description of the Works of Wenceslaus Hollar, 1745 (reprinted 1759); and Medals, Coins, Great Seals, Impressions from the Works of Thomas Simon, 1753 (reprinted 1780). Vertue was also involved with the pre-production of surveys of royal collections, Vanderdoort's catalogue of the collection of Charles I, Chiffinch's James II collection and his on that of Queen Caroline at Kensington; these saw print after his death, prefaced by Walpole.

Horace Walpole purchased Vertue's notebooks after his death. Although disorderly and mainly unreflective, Walpole based his Anecdotes of Painting in England (5 vols., 1762–1771) on these notes. The original wording of the manuscripts was only published in the 20th century by the Walpole Society.

The Dictionary of National Biography, 1900, makes special note of one reproduction by Vertue, in the article on Ralph Agas,

In 1737 George Vertue, the engraver and antiquary, published a pretended copy of Agas's map of London [the "Woodcut" map], stating that it was executed in 1560, and that it gave a true representation of the metropolis as it existed at the beginning of Queen Elizabeth's reign. Vertue crowned his pretended copy with the date 1560 in Roman numerals, made palpable alterations and omissions in order that he might retain the delusive date, and took other unwarrantable liberties with the object of disguising the fraud. The unhappy result of this tinkering of the original design was that numerous subsequent antiquaries were victims of the deception. Mr. Overall is of opinion that Vertue, having become possessed of the parts of a copy of the map made by some unknown Dutch engraver in the reign of William III, caused them to be "tinkered," probably for the purpose of deceiving his antiquarian friends. Of course the numerous copies of the spurious map issued by Vertue are of little or no value; …
