= André Laurent =

André Laurent may refer to:

- Andrew Lawrence (engraver) (1708/10–1747), also known as André Laurent, English engraver working in Paris
- André Laurent (swimmer) (born 1931), Belgian swimmer

== See also ==
- André St. Laurent (born 1953), Canadian ice hockey forward
