= Louis Du Guernier =

Franco-English engraver (1677–1716)

Louis Du Guernier (1677–1716), also anglicized as Lewis Du Guernier, was a Franco-English engraver.

Born in Paris in 1677, Louis was probably a descendant of the well-known French artists of the same name. He was a pupil of Louis de Châtillon, and came to England in 1708. He was a member of the academy in Great Queen Street and gained considerable skill as a designer, etcher, and engraver there. He was eventually chosen one of the directors, and remained so until he died. He was specially employed on small historical subjects, as illustrations to books and plays.

In 1714 he was associated with Claude du Bosc in engraving the battles of the Duke of Marlborough, as he was with the same partner in providing six plates for the expanded edition of The Rape of the Lock that year. Among others engraved by him were portraits of the Duke and Duchess of Queensberry after Godfrey Kneller, Dr. Isaac Barrow, Thomas Otway, and others; also an engraving of "Lot and his Daughters" after Caravaggio, done at the request of Charles Montagu, 1st Earl of Halifax, and some plates for John Baskett's large Bible.

He died of smallpox 19 September 1716, aged 39. Vertue says that ‘he was of stature rather low than middle size, very obliging, good temper, gentleman-like, and well beloved by all of his acquaintance.’ However, in the view of Edward Hodnett (English Book Illustration 1988, p. 75) he probably died around 1735.
