= Thomas Major =

English engraver (1720–1799)

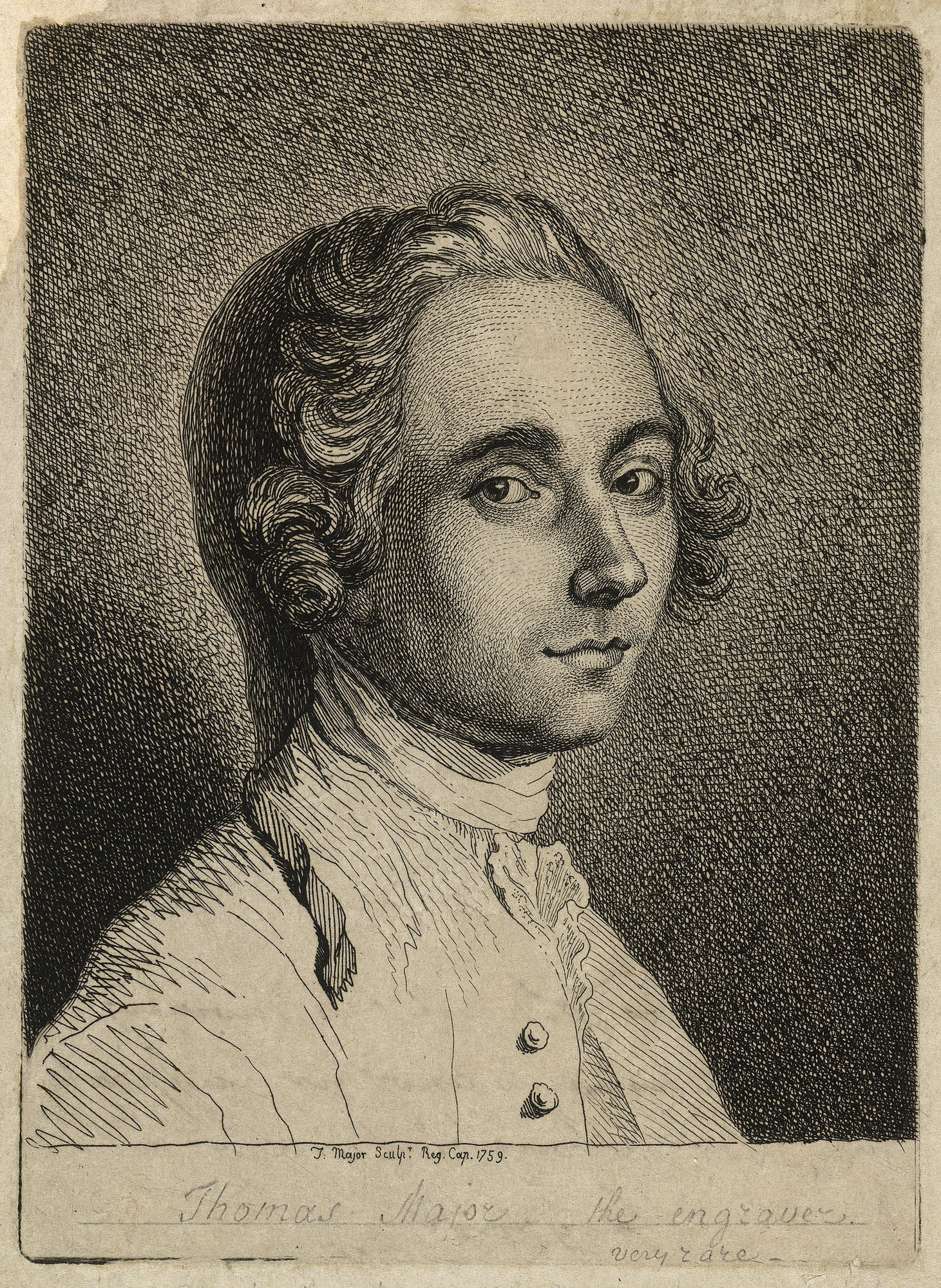
1759 self-portrait of Major

Thomas Major (1720 – 30 December 1799) was an English engraver. His early career was in Paris. In England, he became engraver to Frederick, Prince of Wales. He was the first engraver recognized by the Royal Academy of Arts, and was chief seal engraver to the king.

== In Paris ==
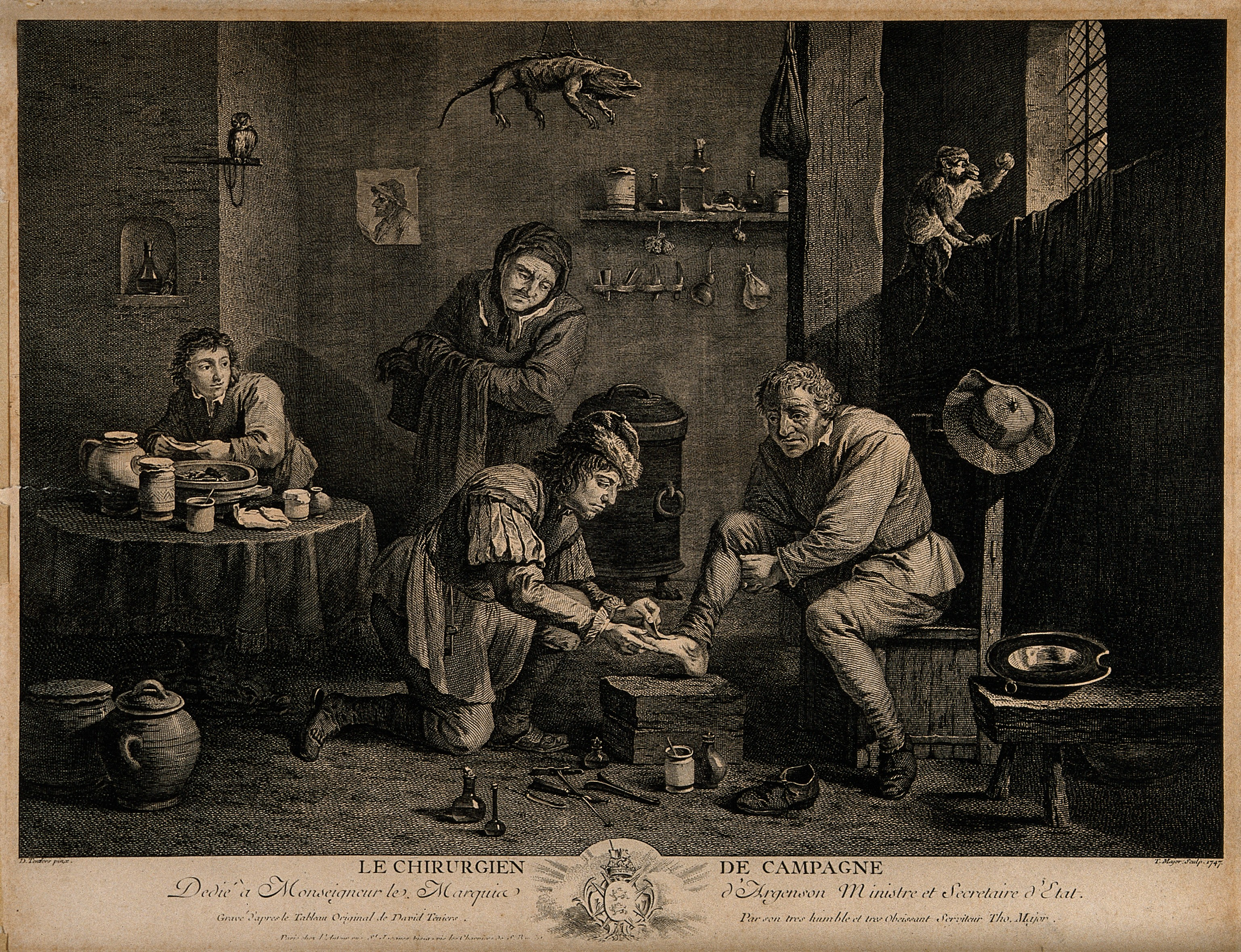
Le Chirurgien de campagne (1747) by Major, after David Teniers the Younger. Dedicated to the Marquis d'Argenson.

Major studied drawing and etching under Hubert Gravelot. In 1745, he moved to Paris, where he associated with the English engravers Andrew Lawrence and John Ingram, and was a pupil of Jacques-Philippe Le Bas and Charles-Nicolas Cochin.

In October 1746, he was imprisoned in the Bastille with other Englishmen as a reprisal for the imprisonment of French and Irish soldiers after the Battle of Culloden. He was released through the intervention of the French foreign minister, the Marquis d'Argenson. On the death of Andrew Lawrence in 1747, Major purchased his copper plates.

== In London ==
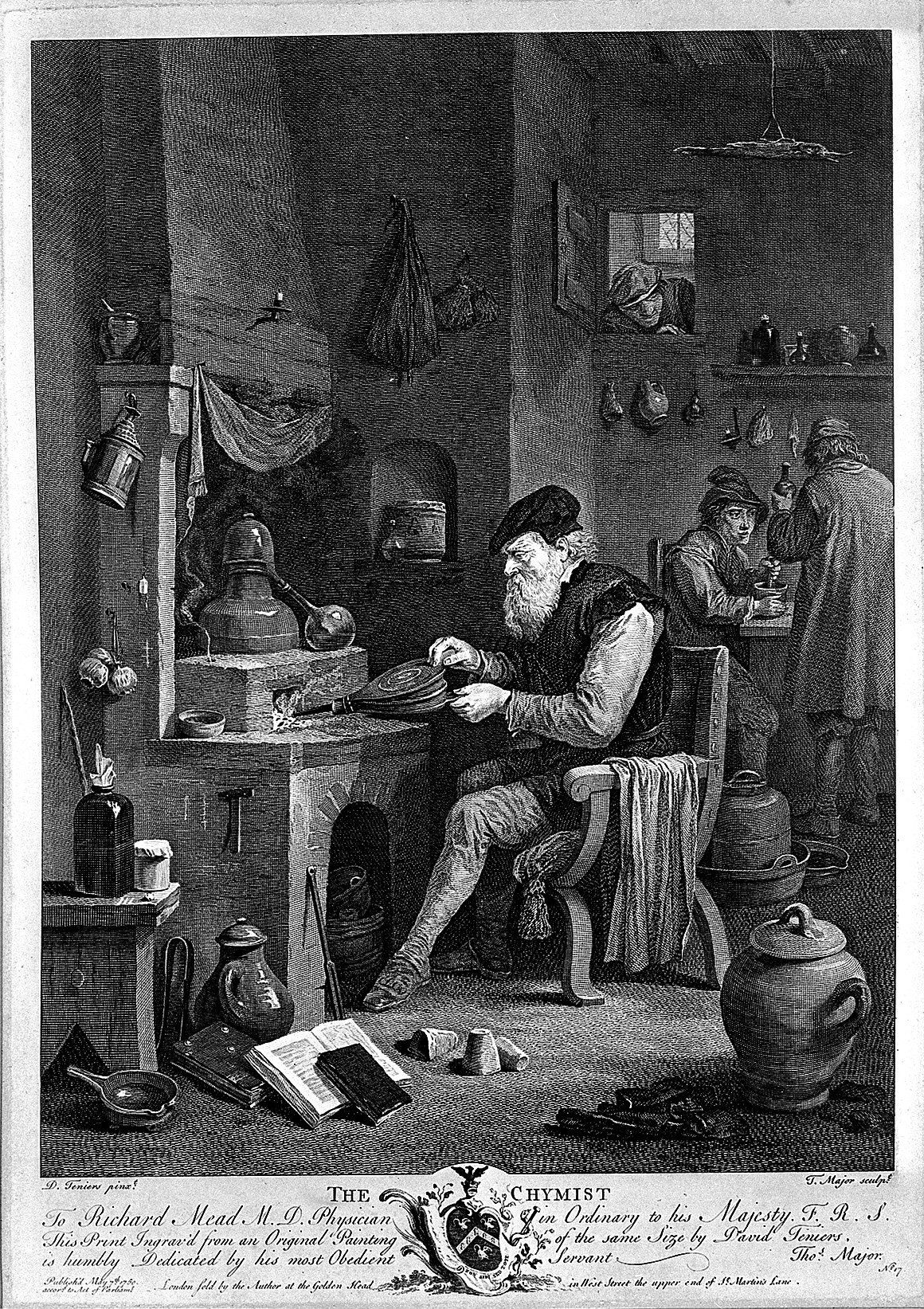
The Chymist (1750) by Major, after David Teniers the Younger.

He returned to England in 1748, and sold to Arthur Pond some prints he had brought from Paris. He acted as agent for Le Bas, importing prints. He married Dorothy, and they had sixteen children between 1752 and 1771.

Major engraved a number of plates after Nicolaes Pieterszoon Berchem, Teniers, Wouwerman, Claude Lorrain, and other masters; and produced many more of the same character that he published himself in St Martin's Lane.

== Royal patronage ==
Major became engraver to Frederick, Prince of Wales. In 1753 he was able, through the patronage of the Duke of Cumberland, to import Andrew Lawrence's plates bought in Paris, and he completed Lawrence's The Death of the Stag, after Philips Wouwerman. Under the Duke of Cumberland's patronage he engraved the views for The Ruins of Palmyra (1753) and The Ruins of Baalbec (1757).

In 1754, Major issued a catalogue of his prints entitled Recueil d'Estampes gravées d'après les meilleurs tableaux des grands maîtres dont on a fait choix dans les cabinets les plus célèbres d'Angleterre et de France, and in 1768 a second catalogue appeared. Copies of some of Major's plates, bearing the name Jorma (anagram of Major), were published in Paris by Pierre-François Basan.

He engraved a few portraits, including a series of four of Earl Granville, his two wives and his sister-in-law Lady Charlotte Finch, dated 1755 and 1757. In 1768, he published The Ruins of Paestum, otherwise Posidonia, in Magna Graecia, illustrated with plates; this was translated into French in 1769 and German in 1781. (Paestum was an archaeological site often visited by people on the Grand Tour.)

== The Royal Academy and the Great Seal ==
Major was the first English engraver to receive the honours of the Royal Academy of Arts, being elected Associate Engraver on 26 February 1770. In 1776, he exhibited at the Academy The Good Shepherd after Bartolomé Esteban Murillo.

He became chief seal engraver to the king, and was engraver to the Stamp Office from 1756 to 1797. When the Great Seal was stolen from the house of Lord Chancellor Edward Thurlow on 24 March 1784, Major, within twenty hours, provided a perfect temporary substitute, and afterwards executed one in silver that was used until the union with Ireland.

Major died at his home in Tavistock Row, Westminster, on 30 December 1799, and was buried at St Giles' Church, Camberwell.
