= Andrew Lawrence (engraver) =

English engraver

Andrew Lawrence (1708/10 – 8 July 1747), (Note: References differ as to birth date.) also known as André Laurent, was an English engraver, working in Paris.

== Life ==
He was born in London, the illegitimate son of Andrew Lawrence, an apothecary in Pall Mall, London. Lawrence's education included painting, drawing, languages and music, playing the violin and flute. His father intended that he should become a physician, and in his will provided £18 per year for his son's support. However, after Lawrence's father's death he fell under the influence of Riario, his father's journeyman, who induced him to experiment on the transmutation of base metals into gold. He lost his fortune, and left England.

Lawrence went to Paris, where he studied engraving under Jacques-Philippe Le Bas, who employed him to etch plates for the low pay of thirty sous a day. Among them are the Halte d'Officiers, Les Sangliers forces and Halte de Cavalerie after Philips Wouwerman, Le Soir after Nicolaes Pieterszoon Berchem, and Le Courrier de Flandres after Both, which were finished, but not always improved, by Le Bas.

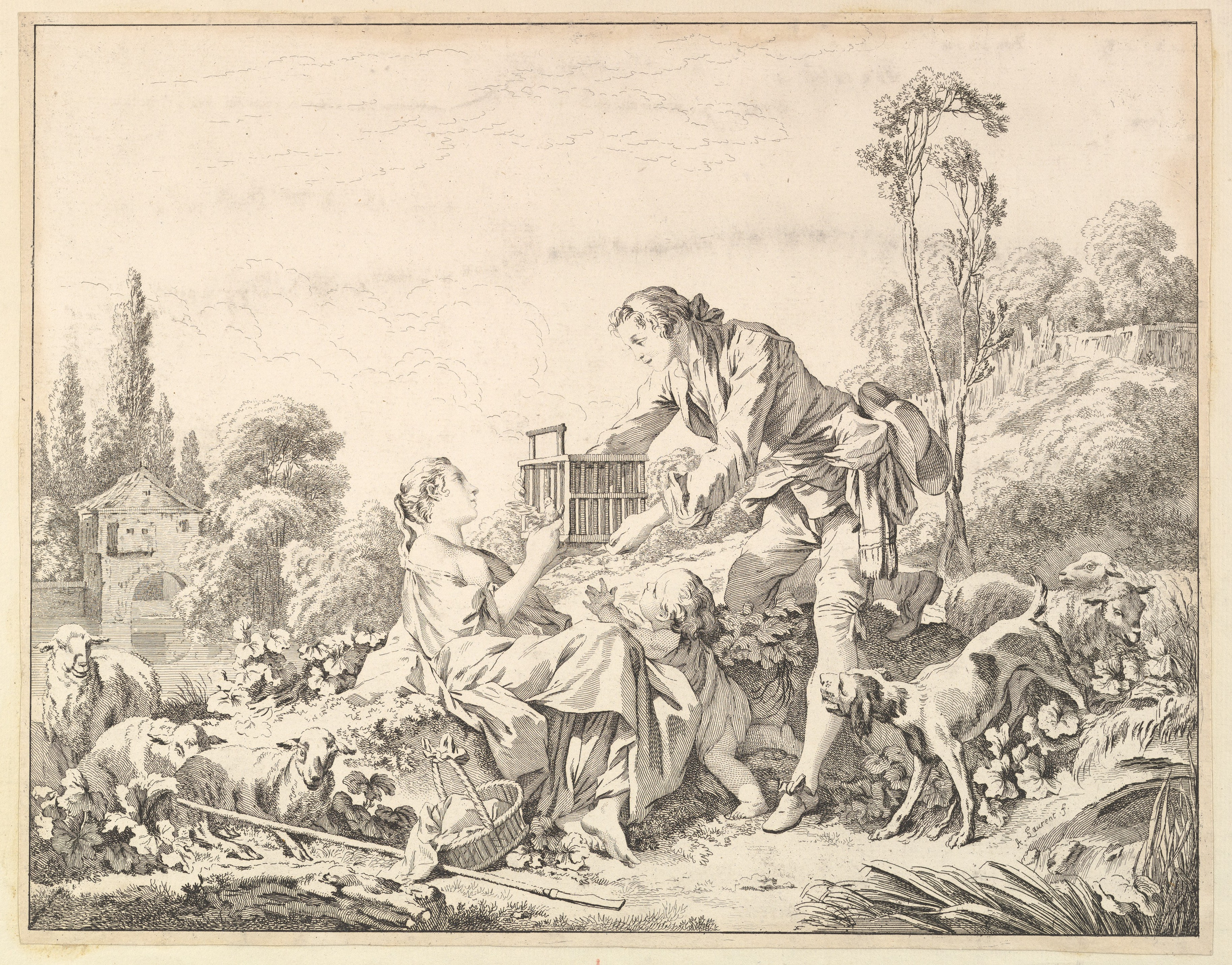
Le pasteur galant by Lawrence

He etched plates which were completed by Jean Audran. One of these was La Moisson after Wouwerman. He executed more than thirty works, of which Saul consulting the Witch of Endor, after Salvator Rosa, was wholly engraved by him. He likewise etched Les Adieux after Wouwerman, Le pasteur galant after Boucher, La Conversation, L'Hiver, and Le Joueur de Quilles after Teniers, and also after Wouwerman The Death of the Stag which was finished by Thomas Major.

Lawrence was urged to apply to the Académie royale de peinture et de sculpture in Paris, but was unwilling to declare himself a Roman Catholic. To avoid, as a Protestant, seizure of his goods on his death, he sold his effects to Pierre Soubeyran a few days before he died, to settle his debts. He died in Paris on 8 July 1747, in the arms of Nicholas Blakey, and was buried in a timber-yard outside the Porte Saint-Antoine, then the usual place of interment for heretics. His copper plates were bought by Thomas Major and taken to England in 1753. Major left in manuscript a memoir of Lawrence, written in 1785.
