= Hubert-François Gravelot =

French engraver (1699 – 1773)

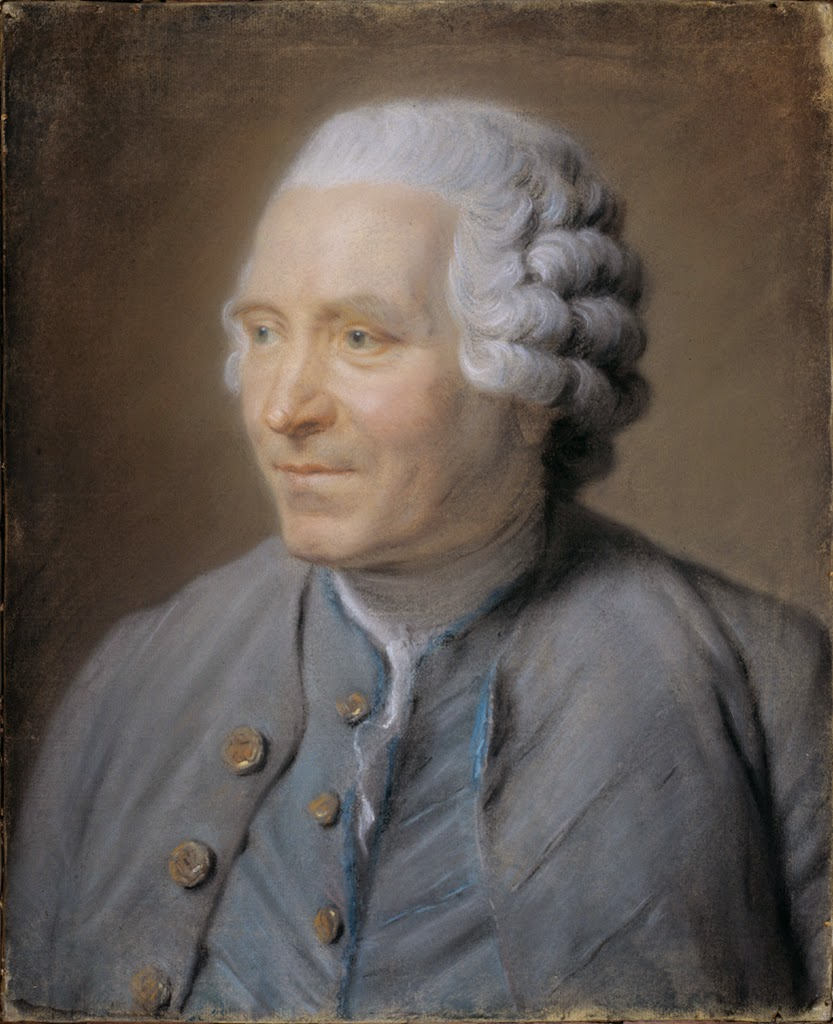
- Maurice Quentin de La Tour, Hubert-François Gravelot, 1769, pastel, Musée des Beaux-Arts, Bordeaux
- Born: Hubert-François Bourguignon; 26 March 1699; Paris, France
- Died: April 20, 1773 (aged 74); Paris, France
- Education: Jean Restout the Younger; François Boucher
- Known for: Engraving; book illustration
- Relatives: Jean-Baptiste Bourguignon d'Anville (elder brother)

Hubert-François Bourguignon, commonly known as Gravelot (26 March 1699 – 20 April 1773), was a French engraver, a famous book illustrator, designer and drawing-master. Born in Paris, he emigrated to London in 1732, where he quickly became a central figure in the introduction of the Rococo style in British design, which was disseminated from London in this period, through the media of book illustrations and engraved designs as well as by the examples of luxury goods in the "French taste" brought down from London to provincial towns and country houses.

== Education ==
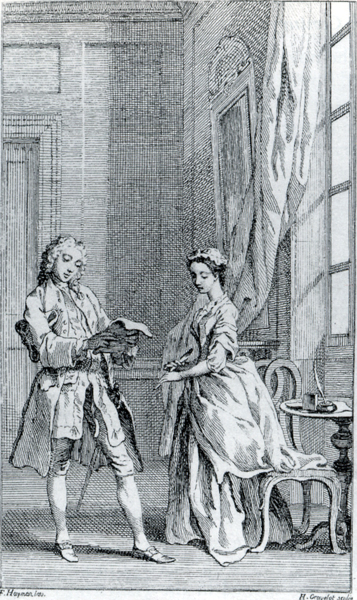
Illustration for the 6th edition of Samuel Richardson's Pamela, 1742, after a design by Francis Hayman

Gravelot was a mediocre student, who did not profit from a premature stay in Rome, financed by his father, from which he returned, his funds depleted, without a stay in Lyon, an artistic center that often provided a stop-over for art students between Paris and Rome. Unsuccessful in a commercial venture at Saint Domingue on his father's account, he returned to Paris and became the pupil first of [Jean Restout the Younger]], and then of François Boucher.

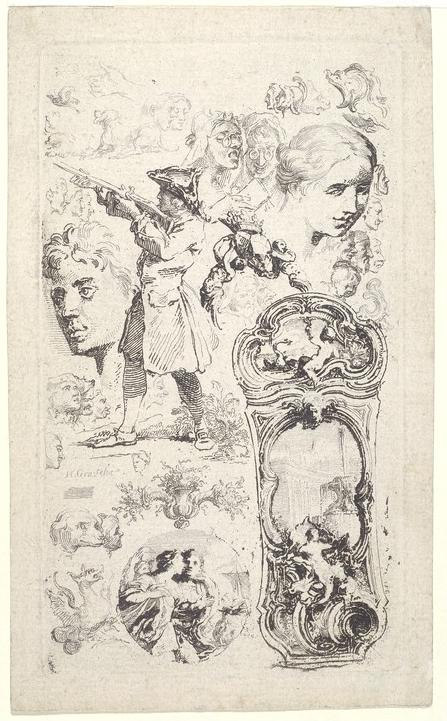
Etching, 1733-1744, Hubert Gravelot (Victoria and Albert Museum)

== Early career ==
His years in London, 1732–45 were fruitful ones. They coincided with a period when Britain and France were not at war. Though French-trained craftsmen, engravers and even some painters, were already working in London, but the Rococo style in luxury works of art was relatively new: the Spitalfields silk industry, always dominated by Parisian innovations rendered by Huguenot designers and weavers, produced its earliest asymmetrical and naturalistic floral designs in the early 1730s, and the earliest identified full-blown Rococo piece of London silver, by the second-generation Huguenot Paul de Lamerie, can be dated about 1731. Gravelot's trip was not a speculation; he had been invited by Claude du Bosc to engrave designs for an English translation of Bernard Picart's Ceremonies and Religious Customs of... the Known World. The chronicler of English art and artists George Vertue, an engraver himself, soon took note of Gravelot: "His Manner of designing neat and correct much like Picart" he noted in 1733. "A very curious pen & writes neatly. He has been lately in Glocestershire where he was imployed to drawn Antient Monuments in Churches & other Antiquities... He has tryd at painting a small piece or two."

George Vertue noted in 1741 that Gravelot's "drawings for Engraving and all other kinds of Gold & Silver works shews he is endowed with a great fruitfull genius for desseins inventions of history and ornaments"

By that time Gravelot had become a central figure in the artistic set that gathered at Slaughter's Coffee House in St Martin's Lane and formed the St. Martin's Lane Academy organised by William Hogarth in the premises of his father-in-law Sir James Thornhill. The St. Martin's Lane Academy was an unofficial precursor of the Royal Academy at a time when there were no public exhibitions of art in London, no annual salons as in Paris, no public museums and no places to see or copy from good examples of paintings save in the houses of the rich or noble. As a drawing-master Gravelot had Thomas Gainsborough for a pupil.

== Personal adult life ==
Gravelot himself was an inveterate, even obsessive reader; his brother's Éloge reports that he would take a small volume to bed with him, in case of insomnia. His easy and elegant book illustrations were worked up from dressed mannikins, fully jointed down to their fingers, which he had made expressly in London.

== Late career ==
Gravelot's rococo book illustrations in London reached a peak in the designs he contributed to Theobald's 1740 edition of the complete works of William Shakespeare, for which Gravelot provided 35 frontispieces.

== Escape back to France ==
Anti-French sentiments in London after the Battle of Fontenoy in 1745 forced Gravelot's return to Paris that October, accompanied by his student Thomas Major, later the first engraver voted an Associate of the Royal Academy, and with a fortune of 10,000 pounds sterling; there he soon settled down as a book illustrator: among his book illustrations, projects were Tom Jones (Paris and London, 1750), Manon Lescaut (1753, illustration, left) a Décaméron (1757), La Nouvelle Héloïse (1761), the Contes moraux of Marmontel (1765), a French translation of Ovid's Metamorphoses (1767–71), and of Torquato Tasso's Gerusalemme Liberata (1771). He died in Paris.

== His work ==
His illustrations of contemporary manners and costumes are known to have influenced English artists. Gravelot revitalized illustrative engraving in England, and after his return to Paris, a group of accomplished engravers continued to work in his manner. The descriptive precision and elegance of his line and the variety of his inventions can be seen in the drawings for two of his more important commissions, the second volume of Gay’s Fables and the second edition of L. Theobald's The Works of Shakespeare in Eight Volumes, and in his illustrations for the first French translation of Boccaccio Le Decameron, 1757. The books are listed by Gordon Ray as one of the most outstanding illustrated books of all time.

Gravelot's designs for the decorative arts were limited to a suite of engravings for wrought iron work, but his rocailles, his cartouches for maps, his rococo borders provided inspiration for goldsmiths and silversmiths, cabinet-makers like Thomas Chippendale, tapestry cartoons made at the Soho works, and china painters at the Chelsea porcelain manufactory.

Gravelot's older brother was the geographer Jean-Baptiste Bourguignon d'Anville, whose "Éloge de M. Gravelot" appeared in La Nécrologie des hommes celebres de France (Paris 1774).

- See Drawings for the illustrations of Boccaccio's Decamerone and Original Drawings From the Collections at the Library of Congress

== Sources ==
- Gowing, Lawrence, ed. (1995). A Biographical Dictionary of Artists (revised ed.). Abingdon, Oxfordshire: Andromeda Oxford Limited. p. 280. ISBN 1-8497-2023-1. OCLC 246968701 – via the Internet Archive.
- Rorschach, Kimerly (1996). "Gravelot". In Turner, Jane (ed.). The Dictionary of Art. Vol. 13. New York: Grove's Dictionaries. pp. 324–325. ISBN 1-884446-00-0. OCLC 1033667059 – via the Internet Archive.
- Singer, Hans Wolfgang [in German] (1921). "Gravelot, Hubert-François". In Thieme, Ulrich; Willis, Fred C. (eds.). Allgemeines Lexikon der bildenden Künstler (in German). Vol. 14. Leipzig: E. A. Seemann. pp. 548–549. OCLC 1039517481 – via the Internet Archive.
- Sullivan, M. G. "Gravelot [formerly Bourguignon], Hubert-François". In Matthew, H. C. G. & Harrison, Brian (eds.). Oxford Dictionary of National Biography. Vol. 23. Oxford, New York: Oxford University Press. pp. 378–380. ISBN 0-19-861373-3. OCLC 1035757654 – via the Internet Archive.
