= Claude Du Bosc =

French-born English engraver

- Born: c. 1682; Kingdom of France
- Died: c. or after 1746; London, Kingdom of Great Britain
- Education: Bernard Picart
- Known for: printmaking; publishing; printselling
- Movement: Rose and Crown Club

Claude Du Bosc (also spelled Dubosc and DuBosc; c. 1682–c. or after 1746) was a French engraver, publisher, and printseller who spent much of his career in London. Associated with French contemporaries such as the painter Antoine Watteau and the draftsman Hubert-François Gravelot, Du Bosc belonged to the first wave of skilled engravers to arrive in London during the early 18th century, playing a major part in improving the standard of English printmaking of that era.

== Life ==
Nothing known of Du Bosc's early life and work; it has been usually thought since the late-19th century that Du Bosc was born in France c. 1682, likely of Protestant background. In Roger Portalis and Henri Béraldi's view, also from the late-19th century, Du Bosc studied engraving under Bernard Picart; an alternate point supposes him to be an associate of Gaspard Duchange. The earliest secure mentions of Du Bosc date to c. 1712–1713, when he produced two plates for Duchange's 1714 publication of Recueil de cent estampes représentant différentes nations du Levant after Jean Baptiste Vanmour. Also published by Duchange are two early prints by Du Bosc, Apollo Visiting Thetis and Leto and the Lycian peasants, both after Jean Jouvenet.

At some point c. 1712–1713, Du Bosc and Charles Dupuis moved to England, requested to assist Nicholas Dorigny in engraving the Raphael Cartoons at Hampton Court. As George Vertue's notebooks state, Du Bosc and Dupuis quarrelled with Dorigny and left his employ before the work was complete. Later in London, Du Bosc told Dupuis that he would stay for some time before moving to France; actually, Vertue recounts, Du Bosc had decided to settle in England, so he wanted Dupuis, a more capable and thus unlikely engraver to compete with, to depart alone to Paris.

In February 1714, Du Bosc undertook with Louis Du Guernier to engrave a series of plates illustrative of the battles of the Duke of Marlborough and Prince Eugene. He sent to Paris for two more engravers, Bernard Baron and Beauvais, to assist him on the work, which was completed in 1717.

George Vertue states that towards the end of 1729 Baron and Du Bosc went over to Paris, Du Bosc wishing to arrange matters relating to the trade of print-selling, as he had now set up a shop, and that Vanloo then painted both their portraits, which they brought back to England. From Vertue's notebooks, it is known that in c. 1726, Du Bosc also sat for another portrait, painted by John Smibert.

In 1733, Dubosc published an English edition of Bernard Picart's Religious Ceremonies of All Nations, some of the plates being engraved by himself; he also invited a younger artist Hubert-François Gravelot for assistance. His other prints included Apollo and Thetis and The Vengeance of Latona, after Jouvenet; some of the Labours of Hercules and The Sacrifice of Iphigenia, after Louis Cheron; The Head of Pompey brought to Cæsar, after Bernard Picart; The Continence of Scipio, after Poussin; The Temple of Solomon, after Parmentière; a portrait of Bonaventura Giffard, and numerous book illustrations, including numerous plates for Rapin's History of England (1743). By 1743, Du Bosc was said by Vertue to be an associate of the Rose and Crown Club; according to Timothy Clayton's 2004 entry published in the Oxford Dictionary of National Biography, Du Bosc was last mentioned in the May 1746 issue of the British Magazine, as a publisher for a plan of the Battle of Culloden.

Later in the 18th century, Joseph Strutt described him as "an engraver of no great merit", adding that "his style of engraving is coarse and heavy; and the drawing of the naked parts of the figure in his plates is exceedingly defective"; Strutt's point has been long reiterated.

== Gallery ==
Selected prints by Claude Du Bosc
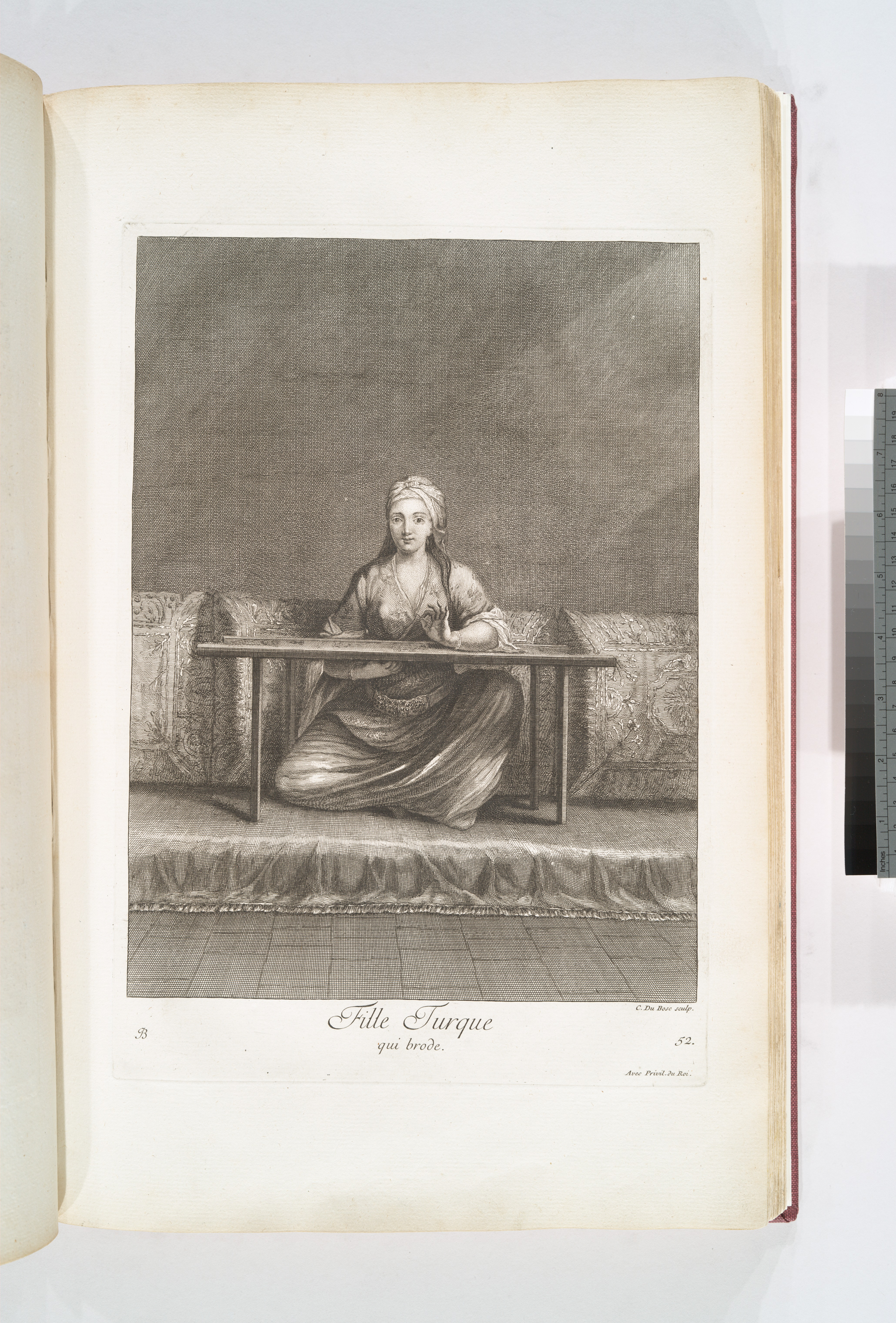
Turkish Girl Sewing, plate from the Nations du Levant, after Jean Baptiste Vanmour, Public Library, New York City

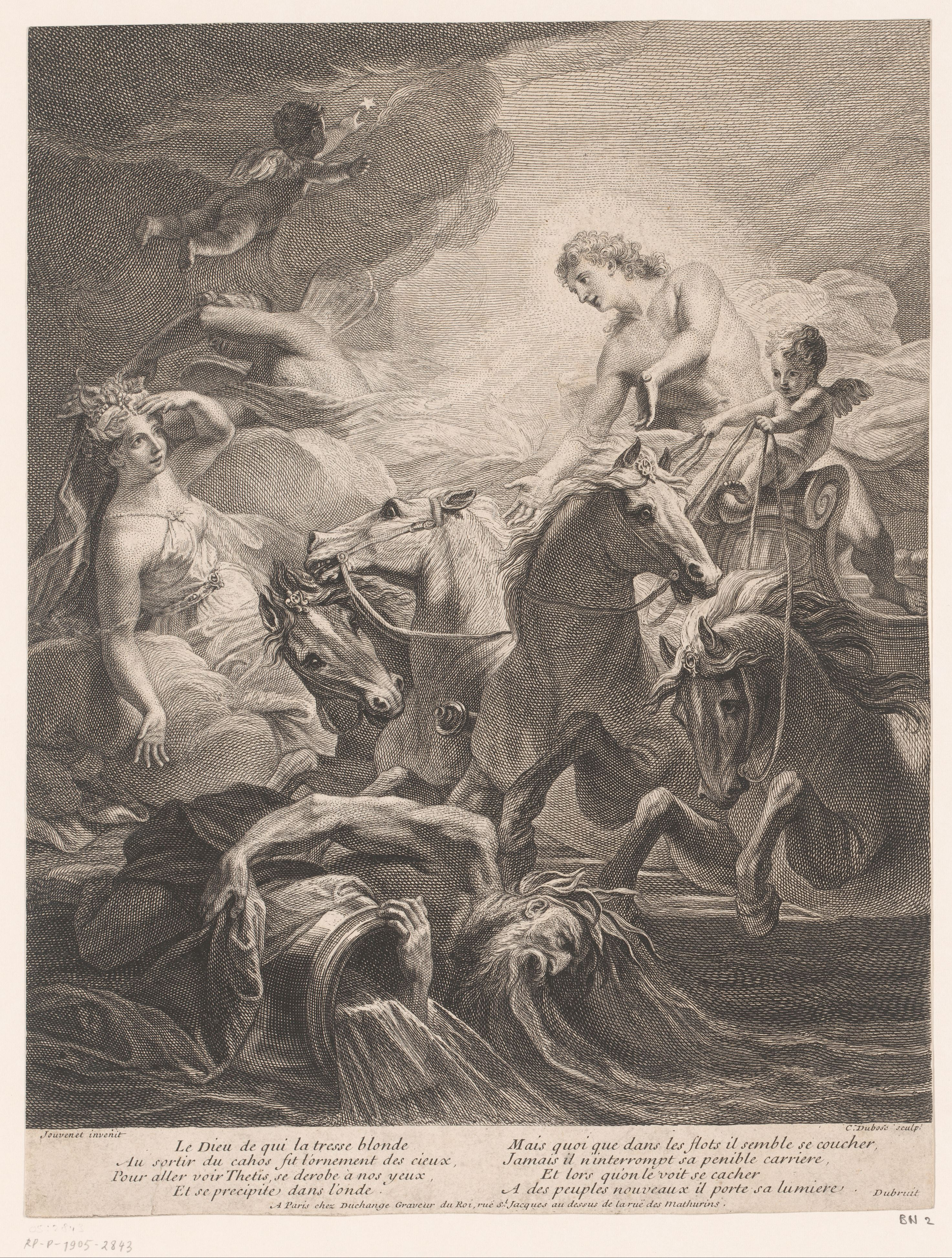
Apollo Visiting Thetis, after Jean Jouvenet, Rijksmuseum, Amsterdam

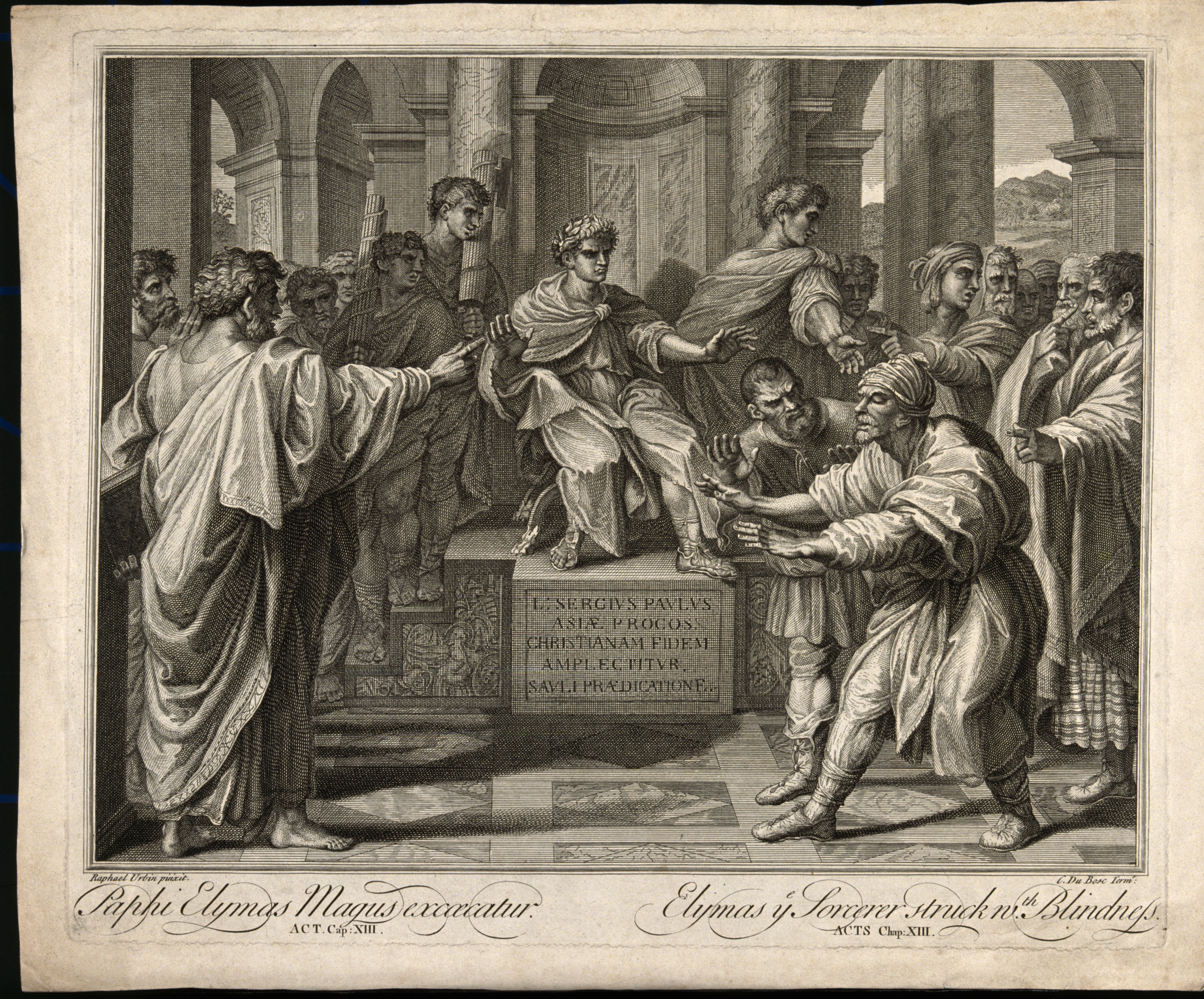
The Conversion of the Proconsul Sergius Paulus, after Raphael, Wellcome Collection, London

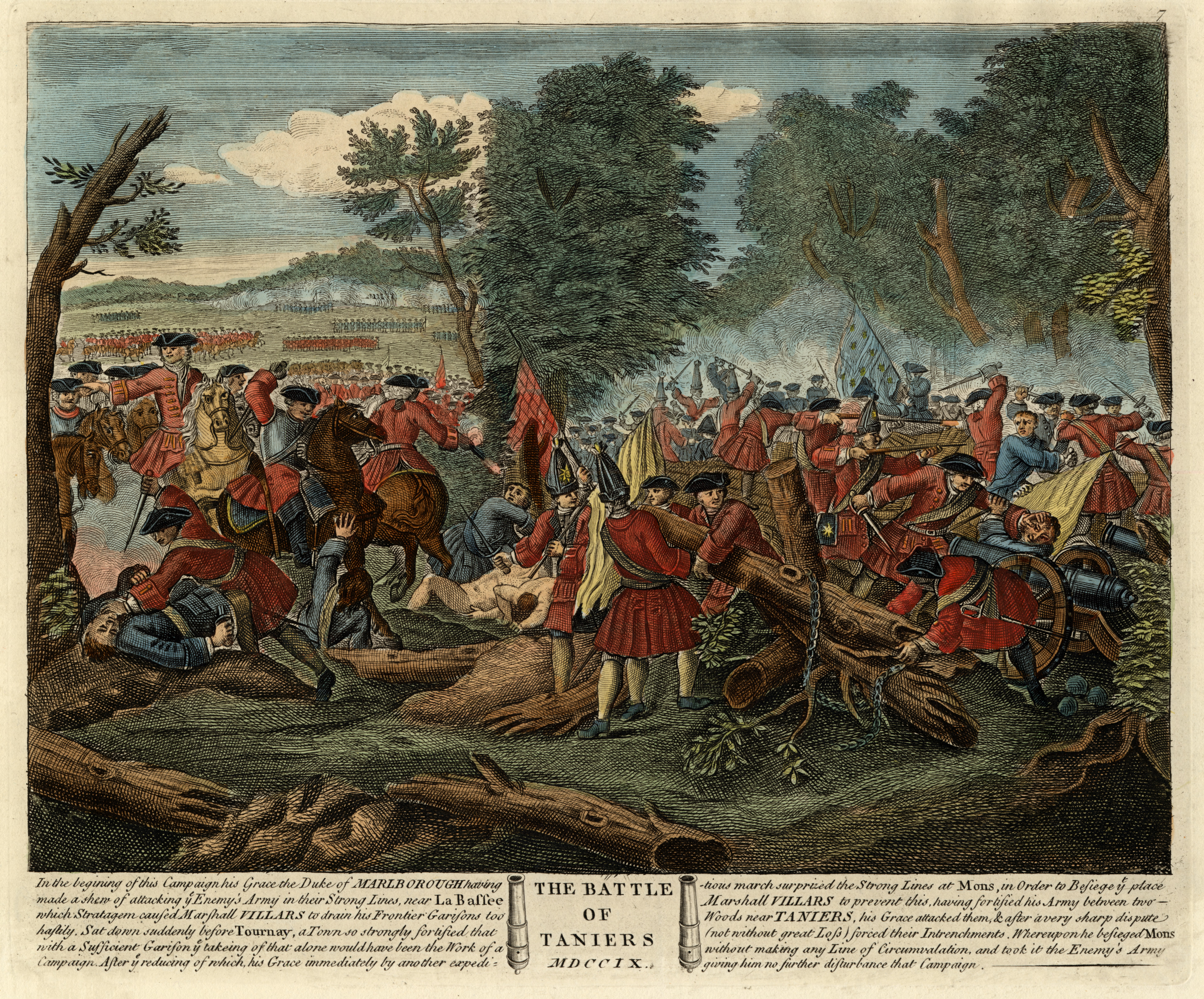
The Battle of Malplaquet, after Louis Laguerre, Brown University Library, Providence, Rhode Island

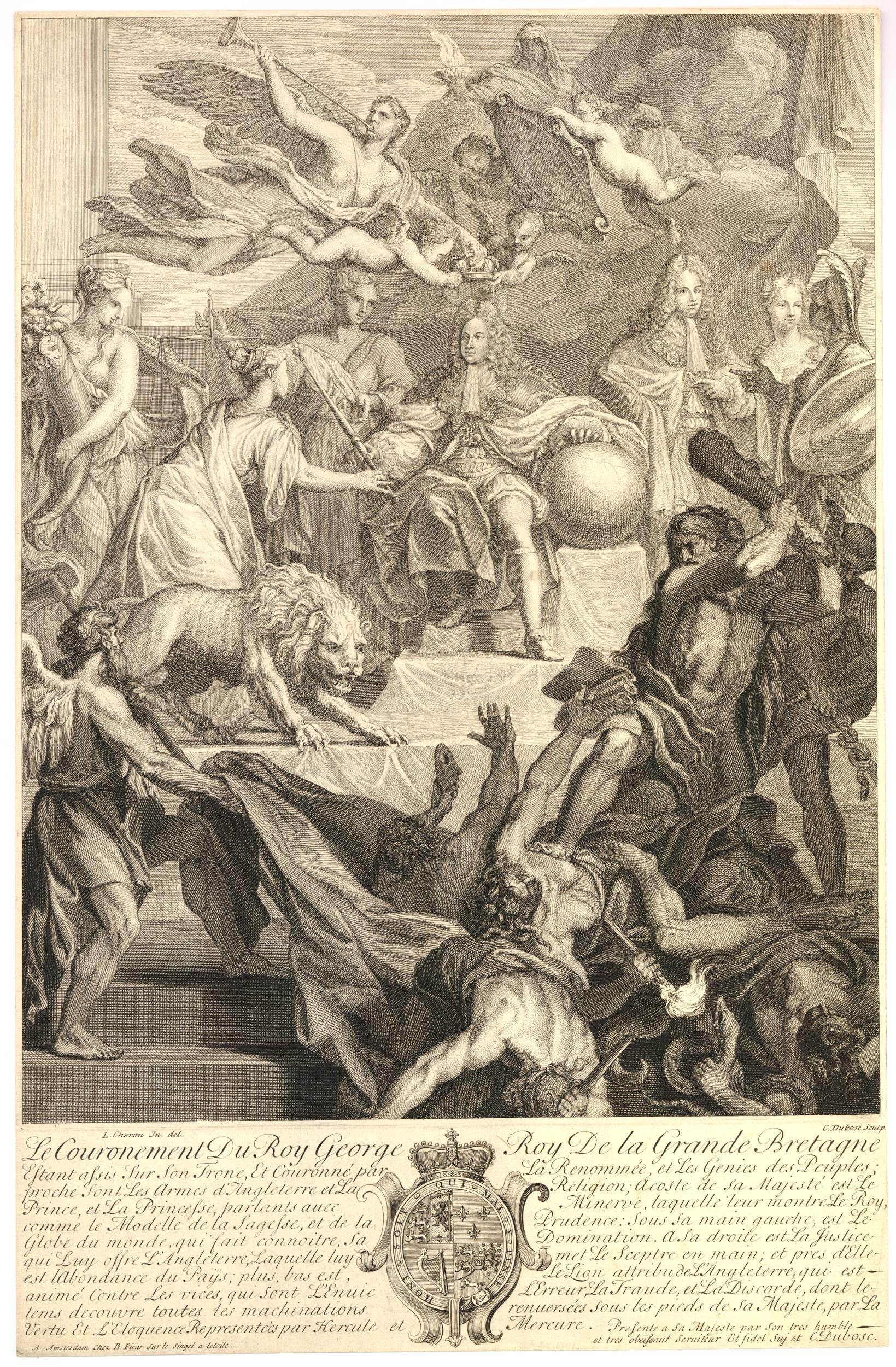
The Coronation of King George I, after Louis Chéron, British Museum, London

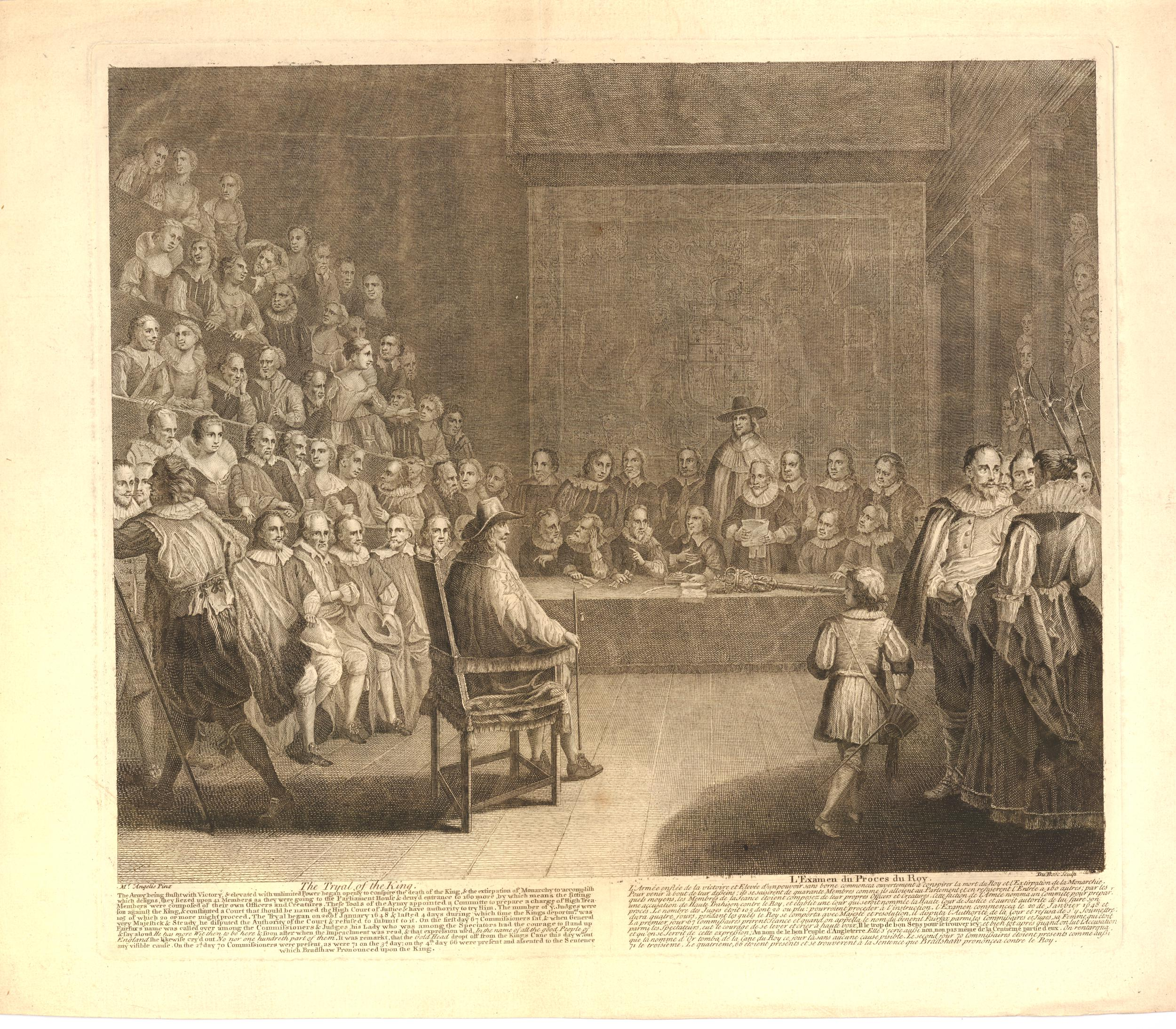
The Trial of the King, plate from The Reign of Charles I, after Peter Angelis, British Museum, London

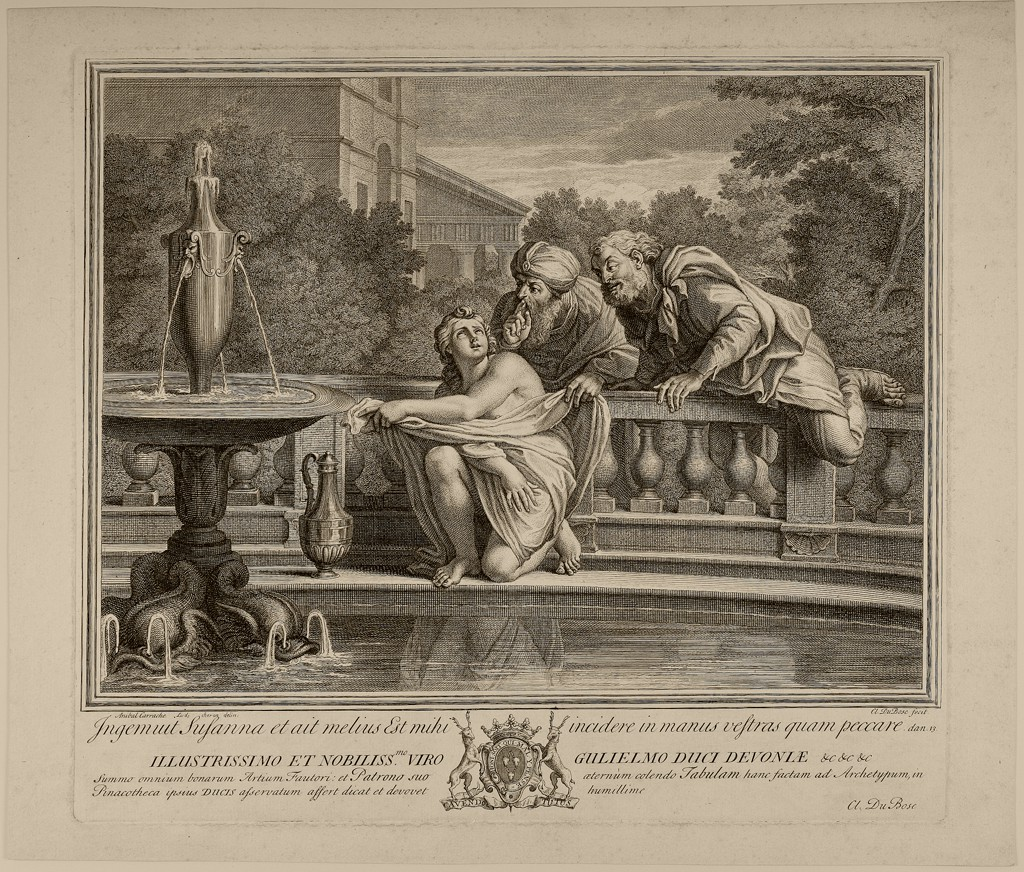
Susanna and the Elders, after Annibale Carracci, Harvard Art Museums, Cambridge, Massachusetts

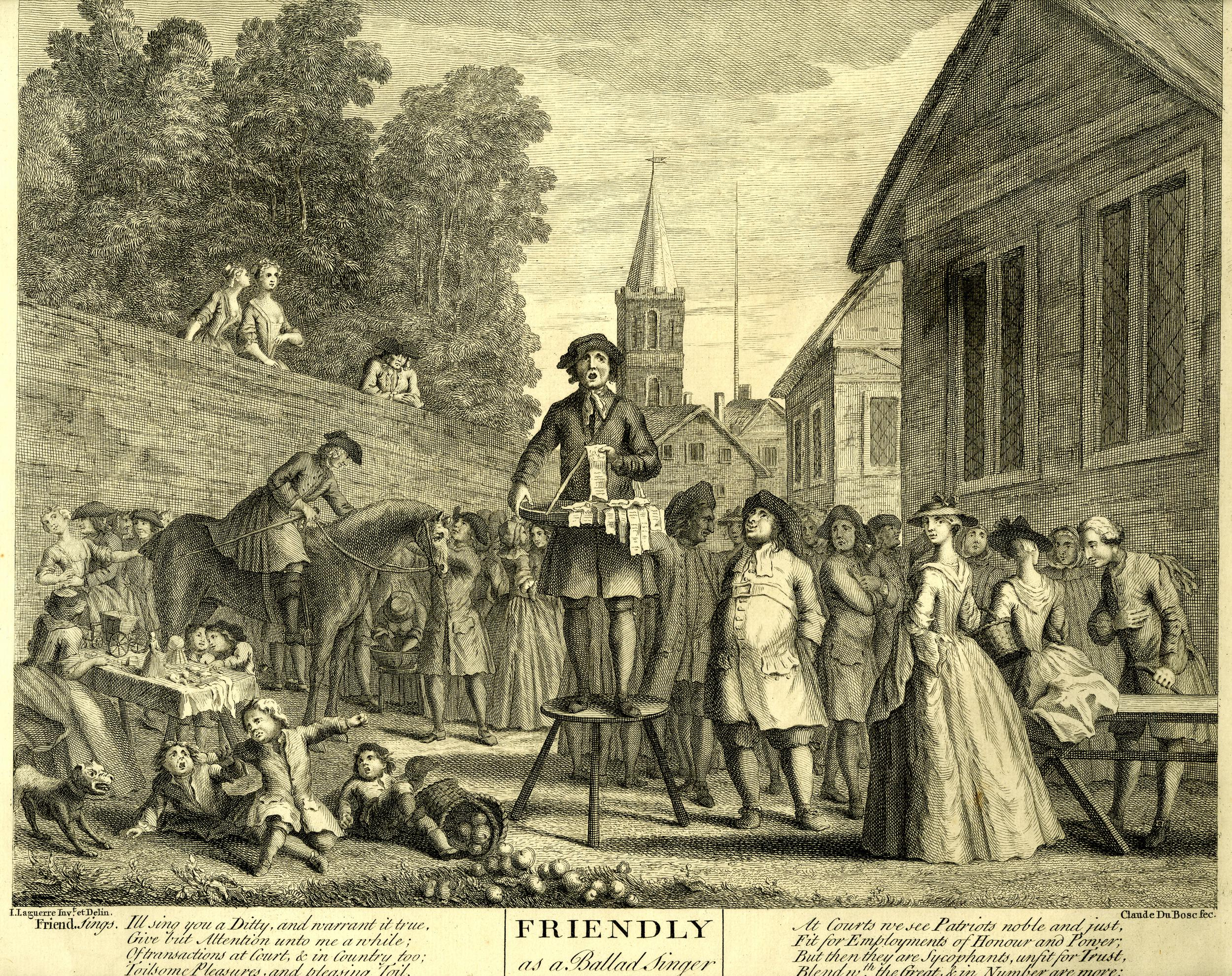
Friendly as a Ballad Singer at the Country Wake, plate from the Humours of Hob series, after John Laguerre, British Museum, London

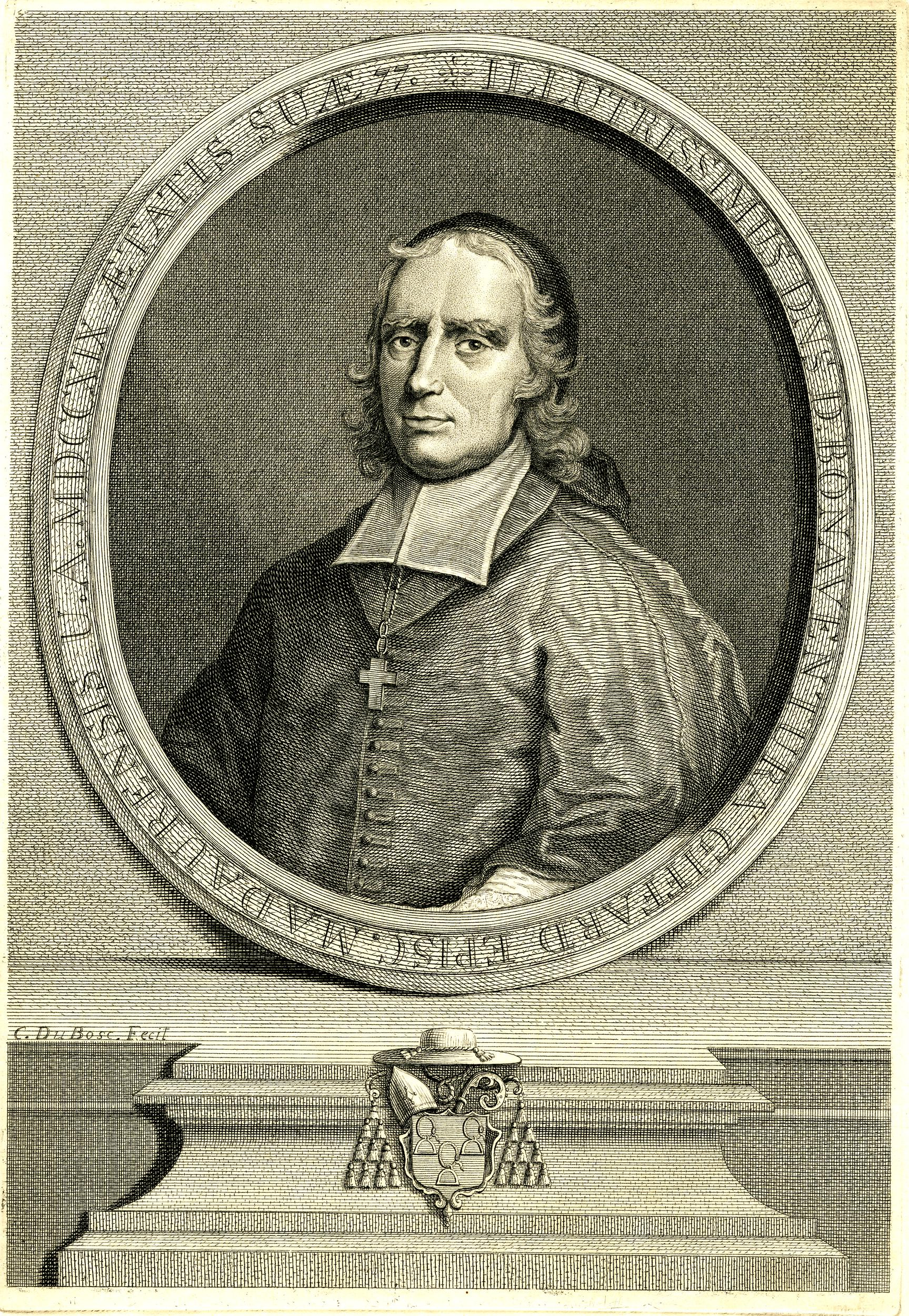
Bonaventure Giffard, British Museum, London

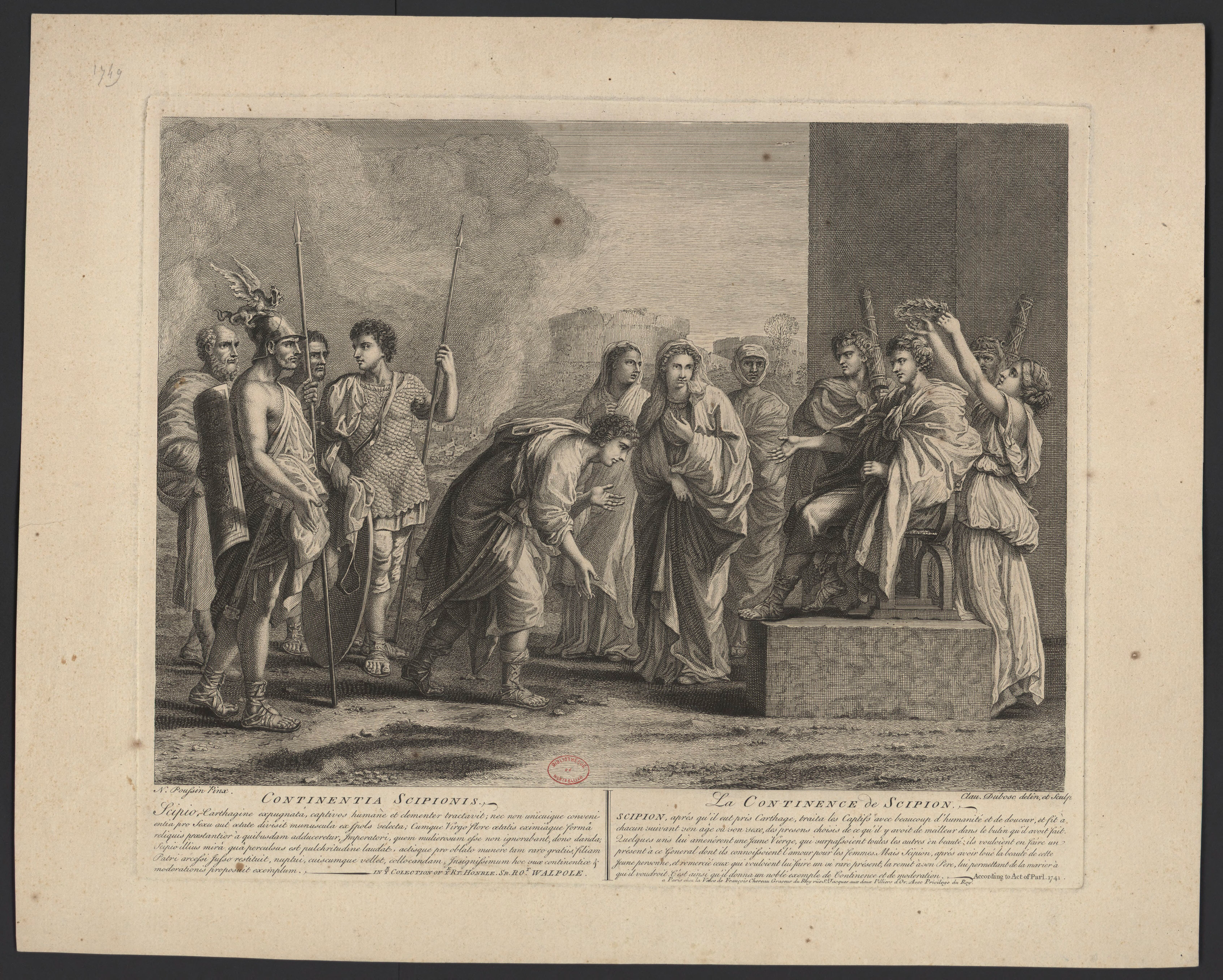
The Continence of Scipio, after Nicolas Poussin, Bibliothèque nationale de France, Paris

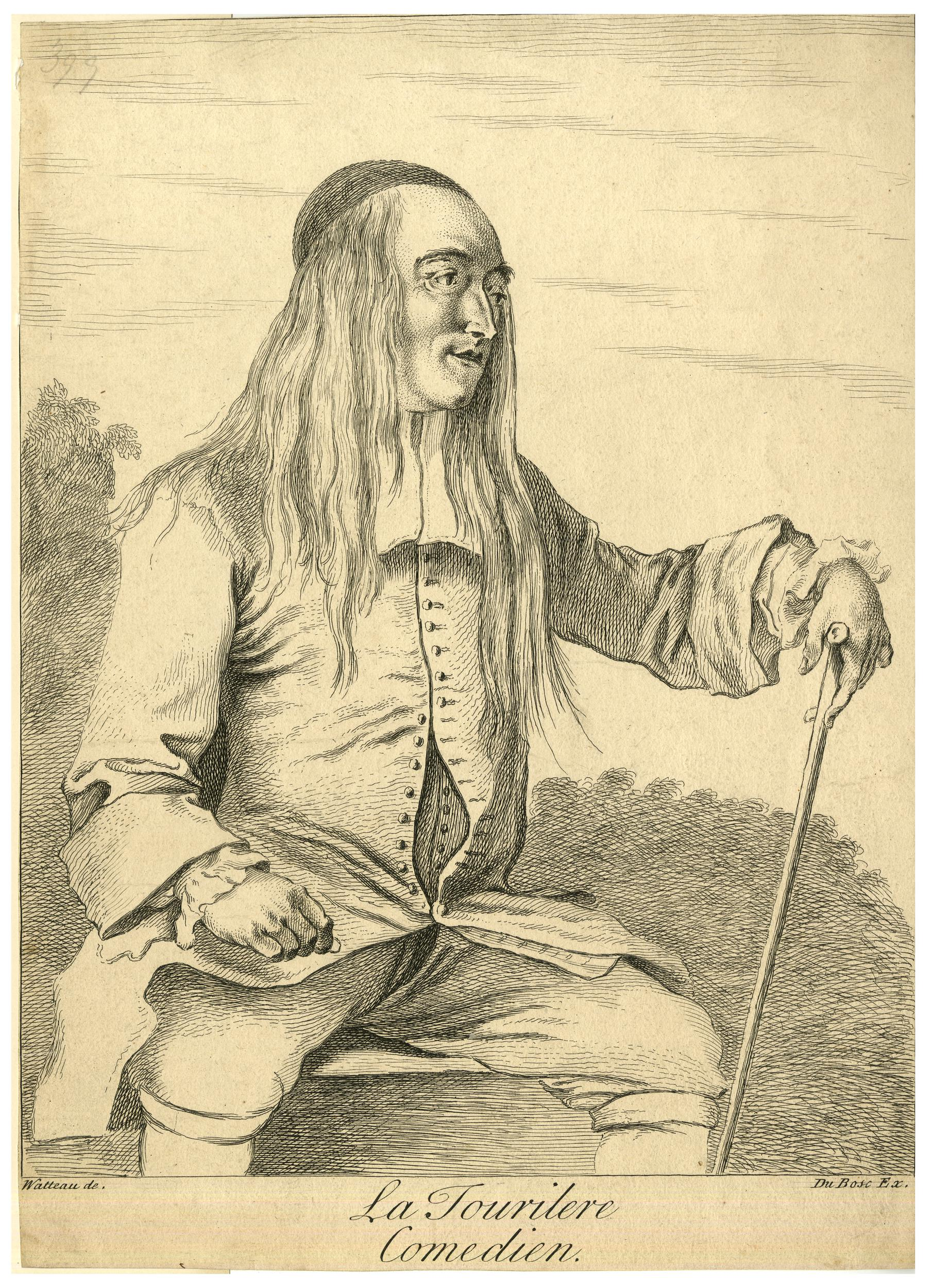
La Tourilere comédien, after Antoine Watteau, British Museum, London

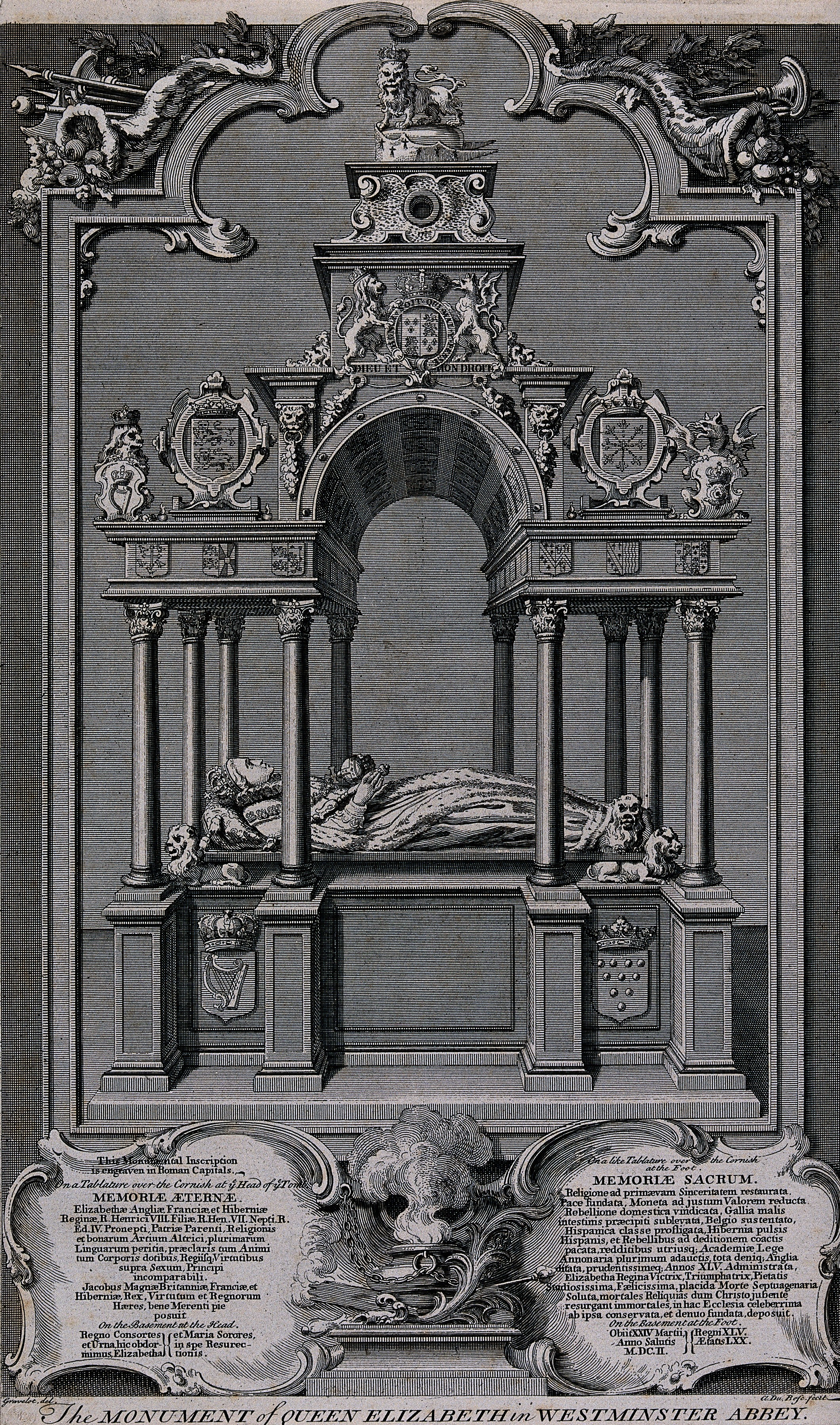
Monument to Queen Elizabeth I in the Westminster Abbey, after design by Hubert-François Gravelot, Wellcome Collection, London

== Sources ==
- Alexander, David; Godfrey, Richard T. (1980). Painters and Engraving: The Reproductive Print from Hogarth to Wilkie (exhibition catalogue). New Haven, CT: Yale Center for British Art. pp. 14, 22. ISBN 0-930606-21-3. LCCN 80-50450. OCLC 894899353 – via the Internet Archive.
- Alexander, David (2022). A Biographical Dictionary of British and Irish Engravers, 1714-1820. London, New Haven: Paul Mellon Centre for Studies in British Art; distributed by Yale University Press. pp. 302–303. ISBN 978-1-913107-21-5. LCCN 2021935706. OCLC 1286378106.
- Antal, Frederick (1962). Hogarth and His Place in European Art. New York: Basic Books. pp. 35, 62, 151, 240. OCLC 1035595582 – via the Internet Archive.
- Atherton, Herbert M. (1974). Political Prints in the Age of Hogarth: A Study of the Ideographic Representation of Politics. Oxford: Clarendon Press. pp. 17, 44, 46. ISBN 0-19-827188-3. OCLC 1034667797 – via the Internet Archive.
- Bellini, Paolo (1995). Dizionario della stampa d'arte (in Italian). Milan: Vallardi. p. 505. ISBN 88-11-91710-7. OCLC 247014252.
- Bénézit, Emmanuel (1924). Dictionnaire critique et documentaire des peintres, sculpteurs, dessinateurs & graveurs de tous les temps et de tous les pays (in French). Vol. 1. Paris: E. Gründ. p. 685. OCLC 1043255411 – via the Internet Archive.
- Bignamini, Ilaria (1988). "George Vertue, Art Historian and Art Institutions in London, 1689–1768: A Study of Clubs and Academies". The Walpole Society. 54: 1–148. ISSN 0141-0016. JSTOR 41829562. OCLC 5543511636.
- Bryan, Michael (1903). Bryan's Dictionary of Painters and Engravers. Vol. 2. New York: Macmillan. p. 92. OCLC 1041634111 – via the Internet Archive.
- Burke, Joseph (1976). English Art, 1714–1800. Oxford History of English Art. Vol. 9. Oxford: Clarendon Press. pp. 177–178. ISBN 0-19-817209-5. OCLC 1150946106 – via the Internet Archive.
- Calloway, Stephen (1981). English Prints for the Collectors. Guildford, London; Woodstock, NY: Lutterworth Press, Overlook Press. p. 42. ISBN 0-87951-120-6. OCLC 1148926166 – via the Internet Archive.
- Clayton, Timothy (1997). The English Print, 1688–1802. London, New Haven: Yale University Press. ISBN 0-300-06650-3. OCLC 807564945.
- Clayton, Timothy (2004). "Du Bosc, Claude". In Matthew, H. C. G. & Harrison, Brian (eds.). Oxford Dictionary of National Biography. Vol. 17. Oxford, New York: Oxford University Press. pp. 17–18. ISBN 0-19-861367-9. OCLC 1035755389 – via the Internet Archive.
- Clayton, Timothy (2014). "The London Printsellers and the Export of English Graphic Prints". In Kremers, Anorthe; Reich, Elisabeth (eds.). Loyal Subversion? Caricatures from the Personal Union Between England and Hanover (1714–1837). Göttingen, Bristol: Vandenhoeck & Ruprecht. pp. 140–161. ISBN 978-3-525-30167-8. OCLC 882905477 – via Google Books.
- Cust, Lionel Henry (1888). "Du Bosc, Claude" . In Stephen, Leslie (ed.). Dictionary of National Biography. Vol. 16. London: Smith, Elder & Co. p. 80.
- Dacier, Émile; Vuaflart, Albert (1922). "Jean de Julienne et les graveurs de Watteau au XVIII-e siècle. III. Catalogue". Jean de Jullienne et les Graveurs de Watteau Au Xviii. Siècle (in French). Paris: M. Rousseau: 20, 34–35, 62, 72–73, 98, 103, 133, 136, 141, 144. doi:10.11588/DIGLIT.41977. OCLC 1039156495.
- Dussieux, Louis (1876). Les artistes français à l'étranger (in French) (3rd ed.). Paris, Lyon: Lecoffre. pp. 315–316. OCLC 986071909 – via the Internet Archive.
- Foote, Henry Wilder (1950). John Smibert, Painter With a Descriptive Catalogue of Portraits, and Notes on the Work of Nathaniel Smibert. Cambridge: Harvard University Press. pp. 24 n. 13, 90, 204–205, 230. OCLC 900850057 – via the Internet Archive.
- Francis, Eric C. (1977). "Chardin and His Engravers". In Mason, Lauris and Ludman, Joan (eds.). Print Collector's Quarterly: An Anthology of Essays on Eminent Printmakers of the World. Vol. 2. Millwood, NY: KTO Press. pp. 1163–1183. ISBN 0-527-62205-2. OCLC 1256507243.
- Fuhring, Peter (September 1985). "The Print Privilege in Eighteenth-Century France–I". Print Quarterly. 2 (3): 175–193. JSTOR 41823682.
- Gatrell, Vic (3 October 2013). The First Bohemians: Life and Art in London's Golden Age. London: Allen Lane. ch. 5, pp. 187, 390, 393, 439 n. 28. ISBN 978-0718195830. OCLC 892832012 – via the Internet Archive.
- Glorieux, Guillaume (2002). À l'enseigne de Gersaint: Edme-François Gersaint, marchand d'art sur le pont Notre-Dame (1694-1750). Seysell: Editions Champ Vallon. p. 384. ISBN 2-87673-344-7. OCLC 401692541 – via Google Books.
- Godfrey, Richard T. (1978). Printmaking in Britain: A General History from Its Beginnings to the Present Day. New York: New York University Press. p. 32, 37. ISBN 0-8147-2973-8. OCLC 1151065422 – via the Internet Archive.
- Goulden, R. J. (April 1982). "William Darres, Claude du Bosc and the European Market". Factotum (14). London: British Library: 17–20. ISSN 0141-3635. OCLC 933322566.
- Grant, Maurice Harold (1952). A Dictionary of British Etchers. London: Rockliff. p. 68. OCLC 3371226.
- Grigson, Caroline (2015). "'An Universal language': William Hunter and the Production of The Anatomy of the Human Gravid Uterus". In Hancock, E. Geoffrey; Pearce, Nick & Campbell, Mungo (eds.). William Hunter's World: The Art and Science of Eighteenth-Century Collecting. Farnham: Ashgate. pp. 59–80. ISBN 978-1-4094-4774-0. OCLC 926655866.
- Harris, Michael (1997). "Scratching the surface: engravers, printsellers and the London book trade in the mid-18th century". In Hunt, Arnold; Mandelbrote, Giles & Shell, Allison (eds.). The Book Trade & Its Customers, 1450-1900: Historical Essays for Robin Myers. Winchester, New Castle Del.: Oak Knoll Press. pp. 95–114. ISBN 1-884718-34-5. OCLC 901699770.
- Haverkamp-Begemann, Egbert (1975). The Achilles Series (PDF). Corpus Rubenianum. London: Phaidon. ISBN 0-7148-1680-9. OCLC 1231982247.
- Herold, Jacques; Vuaflart, Albert (1929). Jean de Julienne et les graveurs de Watteau au XVIII-e siècle. I. Notices et documents biographiques (in French). Paris: M. Rousseau. pp. 90, 93–94, 114, 117 132, 267. doi:10.11588/DIGLIT.41975. OCLC 1039157338.
- Le Blanc, Charles (1854–1890). Manuel de l'amateur d'estampes (in French). Vol. 2. Paris: E. Bouillon. p. 148. OCLC 1048783339 – via the Internet Archive.
- Lippincott, Louise (1983). Selling Art in Georgian London: The Rise of Arthur Pond. Studies in British Art. London, New Haven: Yale University Press. pp. 14, 169 n. 21. ISBN 0-300-03070-3. LCCN 83-40003. OCLC 181794146 – via the Internet Archive.
- Lippincott, Louise (1988). "Arthur Pond's Journal of Receipts and Expenses, 1734-1750". The Walpole Society. 54: 220–333. JSTOR 41829564.
- Mackenzie, Ian (1987). British Prints: Dictionary and Price Guide. Woodbridge, Suffolk: Antique Collectors' Club. p. 106. ISBN 0-902028-96-0. OCLC 1244508760 – via the Internet Archive.
- Meyer, Arline (1996). Wallach Art Gallery, New York City (ed.). Apostles in England: Sir James Thornhill & the Legacy of Raphael's Tapestry Cartoons (exhibition catalogue). New York: Wallach Art Gallery. pp. 29–30, 76, 84. ISBN 1-884919-02-2. OCLC 876214925 – via Google Books.
- Nagler, Georg Kaspar (1836). "Dubosc, Claude". Neues Allgemeines Künstler-Lexicon (in German). Vol. 3. München: E. A. Fleischmann. p. 323 – via Google Books.
- Paulson, Ronald (1974) [1971]. Wilde, Anne (ed.). Hogarth: His Life, Art, and Times (abridged ed.). New Haven, London: Yale University Press. pp. 21–23, 56, 156. ISBN 0-300-01766-9. OCLC 1193948705 – via the Internet Archive.
- Paulson, Ronald (1991). Hogarth, Vol. 1: The Modern Moral Subject, 1697–1732. New Brunswick, London: Rutgers University Press. pp. 58, 60, 99, 305. ISBN 0-7188-2854-2. OCLC 634205524 – via Google Books.
- Portalis, Roger; Béraldi, Henri (1882). "Dubosc (Claude)". Les graveurs du dix-huitième siècle [Engravers of the Eighteenth Century] (in French). Vol. 2 (pt. 1). Paris: D. Morgand et C. Fatout. p. 26. OCLC 1050236069 – via the Internet Archive.
- Redgrave, Samuel (1878). A Dictionary of Artists of the English School (2nd ed.). London: George Bell. p. 131. OCLC 1043009709 – via the Internet Archive.
- Roland Michel, Marianne (1986). "Watteau and England". In Hind, Charles (ed.). The Rococo in England. London: Victoria and Albert Museum. pp. 46–59. ISBN 0-948107-37-5. OCLC 18588917.
- Roux, Marcel; Pognon, Edmond (1951). Inventaire du fonds français, graveurs du XVIIIe siècle (in French). Vol. 7. Paris: Bibliothèque nationale de France. pp. 360–374. OCLC 763820240 – via Gallica.
- Saunders, Richard H. (1995). John Smibert: Colonial America's First Portrait Painter. New Haven, London: Yale University Press. pp. 54–55, 102, 223. ISBN 0-300-04258-2. OCLC 31607421.
- Simon, Robin (2007). Hogarth, France and British Art: The Rise of the Arts in 18th-century Britain. London: Hogarth Arts. pp. 19, 67–69, 80, 86, 133. ISBN 978-0-9554063-0-0. LCCN 2007-531485. OCLC 984012475 – via Google Books.
- Smibert, John (1969). The Notebook of John Smibert. Boston: Massachusetts Historical Society. OCLC 6380 – via the Internet Archive.
- Stein, Perrin (September 1996). "Amédée Van Loo's Costume turc: The French Sultana". The Art Bulletin. 78 (3): 417–438. JSTOR 3046193.
- Strong, Roy C. (2000). The Artist and the Garden. New Haven, London: Yale University Press. p. 210. ISBN 0-300-08520-6. OCLC 1244217591 – via the Internet Archive.
- Strutt, Joseph (1785). "Claude Du Bosc". A Biographical Dictionary Containing All the Engravers, From the Earliest Period of the Art of Engraving to the Present Day. Vol. 1. London: Robert Faulder. pp. 127–128. OCLC 1045376483 – via the Internet Archive.
- Sunderland, John (August 1973). "Paulson's Hogarth". The Burlington Magazine. 115 (845): 538, 541–542. JSTOR 877415.
- Tarantino, Giovanni (2016). "A 'Protestant' Approach to Colonization as Envisaged in John Lockman's Martyrology". In Broomhall, Susan and Finn, Sarah (eds.). Violence and Emotions in Early Modern Europe. London, New York: Routledge. pp. 185–202. ISBN 978-1-315-68945-6 – via Google Books.
- Thieme, Ulrich, ed. (1914). "Dubosc (Du Bosc), Claude". Allgemeines Lexikon der bildenden Künstler (in German). Vol. 10. Leipzig: E. A. Seemann. p. 2. OCLC 1039510711 – via the Internet Archive.
- Treydel, Renate (2001). "Dubosc (Du Bosc), Claude". In Kasten, Eberhard; et al. (eds.). Allgemeines Künstlerlexikon (in German). Vol. 30. München, Leipzig: Saur. p. 79. ISBN 3-598-22770-1. OCLC 491513403.
- Uglow, Jennifer S. (1997). Hogarth: A Life and a World. London: Faber and Faber. ch. 6, pp. 52–53, 726 n. 25. ISBN 0-571-16996-1. OCLC 1256244974 – via the Internet Archive.
- Vertue, George (1765). Walpole, Horace (ed.). A Catalogue of Engravers. Strawberry Hill: Thomas Kirgate. p. 122. OCLC 1039533429 – via the Internet Archive.
- Vertue, George (1932). "The Note-Books of George Vertue Relating to Artists and Collections in England (II)". The Walpole Society. 20. whole issue. JSTOR i40086519.
- Vertue, George (1934). "The Note-Books of George Vertue Relating to Artists and Collections in England (III)". The Walpole Society. 22. whole issue. JSTOR i40086509.
- Vertue, George (1952). "The Note-Books of George Vertue Relating to Artists and Collections in England (VI)". The Walpole Society. 30. whole issue. JSTOR i40086545.
- Walpole, Horace (1879). Anecdotes Of Painting In England. London: Ward, Lock, and Co. p. 457. OCLC 1039484687 – via the Internet Archive.
- Waterhouse, Ellis K. (1978) [1953]. Painting in Britain, 1530 to 1790. The Pelican History of Art (4th ed.). Harmondsworth, England; New York: Penguin Books. p. 165. ISBN 0-14-056101-3. OCLC 1245624144 – via the Internet Archive.
- Wescher, Paul (Autumn 1951). "Philippe Mercier and the French Artists in London". Art Quarterly. 14: 179–194 – via the Internet Archive.
