= Two Studies of an Actor =

Drawing by Antoine Watteau

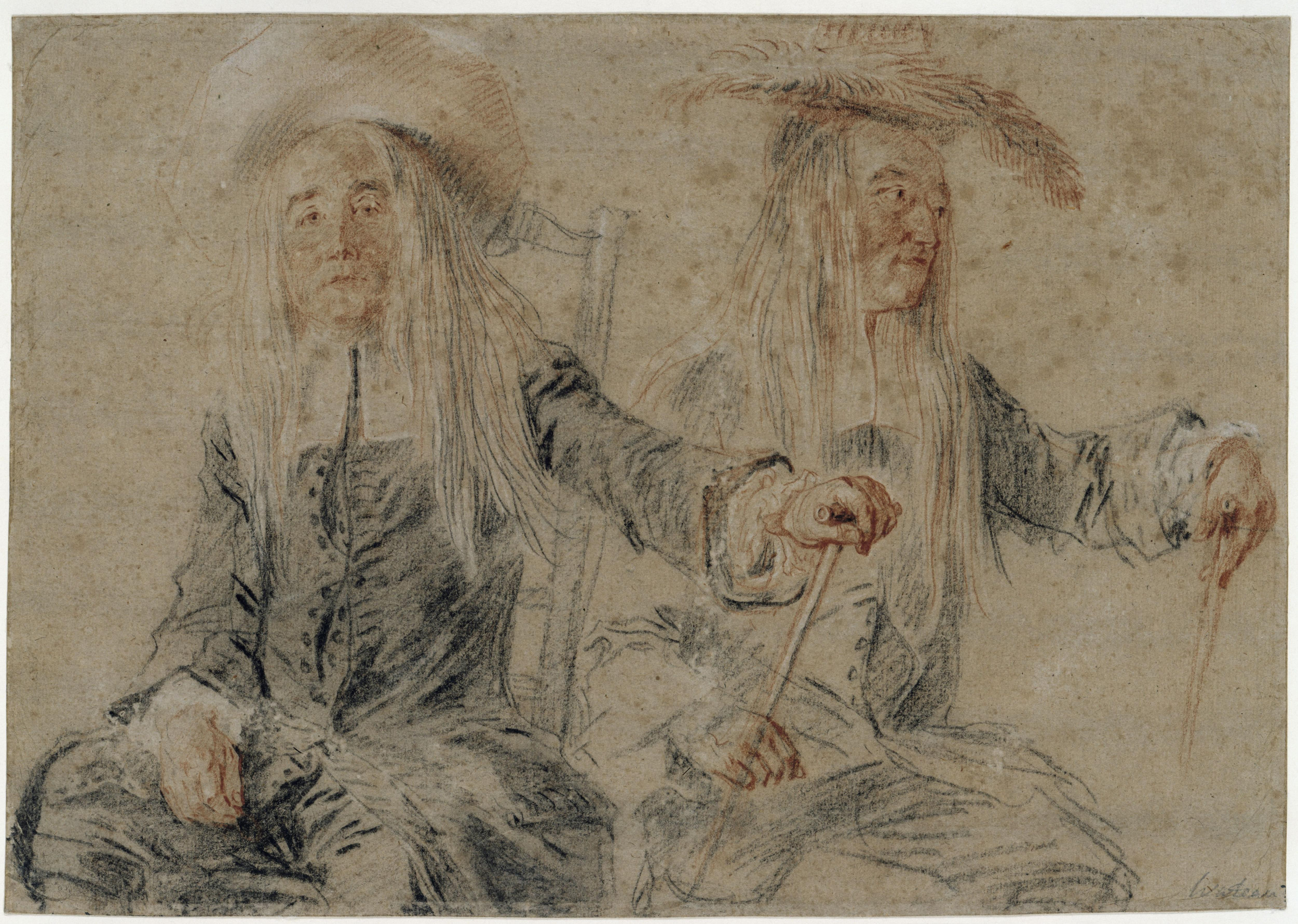
- Artist: Antoine Watteau
- Year: c. 1716–1721; See § Provenance and dating
- Catalogue: PM 914; RP 653
- Medium: Sanguine, black, and white chalks on brownish paper, laid down
- Subject: presumed to be either the Abbé Pierre-Maurice Haranger or Pierre Le Noir, sieur de La Thorillière; See § Identity of the sitter
- Dimensions: 26 cm × 37.2 cm (10 in × 14.6 in)
- Location: Kupferstichkabinett; Berlin
- Accession: KdZ 2319

Two Studies of an Actor is the name (Note: As a consequence of various attributions and preferences by scholars and curators, the sheet is known under many names in literature, such as following: Musée de l'Orangerie 1950, cat. no. 60, pl. 5: Deux etudes d'homme assis; Parker & Mathey 1957–1958, vol. 2, p. 378, cat. no. 914: Deux études du comédien La Thorillière (?); Grasselli, Rosenberg & Parmantier 1984, p. 141 (p. 144 in respective French and German editions): Two Studies of an Actor (French: Deux études d'un acteur; German: Zwei Studien eines Schauspielers); Rosenberg & Prat 1996, vol. 2, p. 1116, cat. no. 653, Rosenberg 2001, p. 31, fig. 29, and Lajer-Burcharth 2015, p. 10: Double portrait du chanoine Haranger (English: Double Portrait of Canon Haranger).) given to a sheet of drawings in the trois crayons technique by the French Rococo artist Antoine Watteau. Dated between 1716 and 1721, the sheet was once in the collection of Watteau's friend, the manufacturer and publisher Jean de Jullienne; passing through a number of private owners, it was acquired in 1874 by the Kupferstichkabinett, Berlin, where it remains.

The sheet consists of two compositional half-length studies of a sitting old man wearing a hat, holding a cane in the left hand; the left figure has the old man shown en face, and the right one respectively has him shown in a three-quarters turn. In scholarship, the sheet is noted as an example of Watteau's approach with multiple treatment of a single figure, compared to these of Anthony van Dyck and Philippe de Champaigne found in their respective portraits of Charles I of England and Cardinal Richelieu.

The identity of the sitter remains somewhat ambiguous among Watteau scholars; two of the artist's contemporaries were thought to be the sitter: the Catholic priest Pierre-Maurice Haranger and the Comédie-Française player Pierre Le Noir, sieur de La Thorillière. Coming from either of these identities, the sheet is related to numerous paintings and drawings by Watteau.

== Provenance and dating ==
In the 18th century, the sheet belonged to Watteau's friend and patron, the manufacturer and publisher Jean de Jullienne; it was said by Edmond de Goncourt that the sheet was lot 787, (Note: Parker & Mathey 1957–1958, vol. 2, p. 378, cat. no. 914, and Grasselli, Rosenberg & Parmantier 1984, p. 142, incorrectly list the lot number as 737.) sold for 82 livres at the sale held after Jullienne's death in Spring 1767, described as "Deux hommes en habit de paysan; ils sont assis, la main gauche de chacun est posée sur une canne en béquille."

After remaining obscure for a century, the sheet resurfaced in the 1870s, passing through numerous private collectors known only by name. By 1871, it was in possession of a certain De Vos; then it passed to another owner, a Rotterdam-based collector D. Vis Blokhuyzen. After Blokhuyzen's death, the sheet was sold as lot 664 at auction on October 23, 1871, to the German entrepreneur Barthold Suermondt (1818–1887); as part of Suermondt's collection, the sheet has been acquired for the Kupferstichkabinett, Berlin, in 1874.

In a 1984 monograph on Watteau, Marianne Roland Michel dates the sheet as earlier as c. 1716–1717, relying on the drawing style. in the 1984–1985 exhibition catalogue, the National Gallery of Art curator Margaret Morgan Grasselli dated the drawings c. 1716; in a later 1987 dissertation on Watteau's drawings, she re-attributed the sheet to final months of Watteau's life, c. 1721. In the 1996 catalogue raisonné, Pierre Rosenberg and Louis-Antoine Prat give the sheet an earlier dating of c. 1720.

== Related prints ==
In the 1720s, François Boucher had the sheet engraved in reverse as two separate etchings; the etching after the left figure was published in 1726 as plate 69 in volume one of the Figures de différents caractères, while the etching after the right figure, in which Boucher notably replaced the hat with a skullcap, was respectively published in 1728 as plate 198 in the said anthology's volume two. Boucher's etching of the right figure has been later reproduced by Claude Du Bosc, captioned La Tourilere comédien. Prints after the Berlin sheet were recorded in the 1875 catalogue raisonné of Watteau's art compiled by Edmond de Goncourt; various reissues of Edmond and Jules de Goncourt's anthology L'art du dix-huitième siècle mention "la planche des «Différents caractères» qui passe pour représenter l'acteur La Thorillière," which is likely a reference to Du Bosc's print rather than Boucher's ones. Besides from prints, there is a sheet of sanguine studies in the Louvre that notably features a partial copy after the left figure of the Berlin sheet.

Related prints
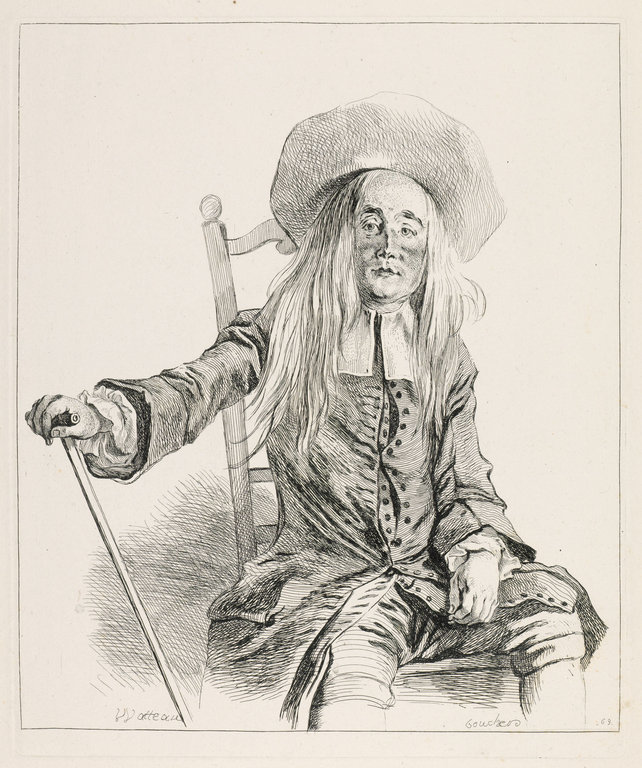
François Boucher after Watteau, Vieillard assis sur une chaise, coiffé d'un grand chapeau, 1726, etching, plate 69 in Figures de différents caractères; Louvre, Paris

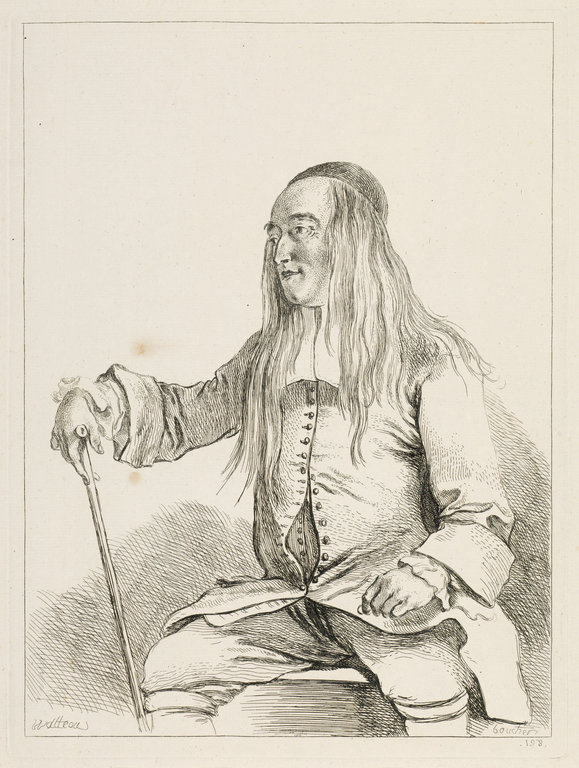
Boucher after Watteau, Vieillard assis, coiffé d'une calotte, 1728, etching, plate 198 in Figures de différents caractères; Louvre, Paris

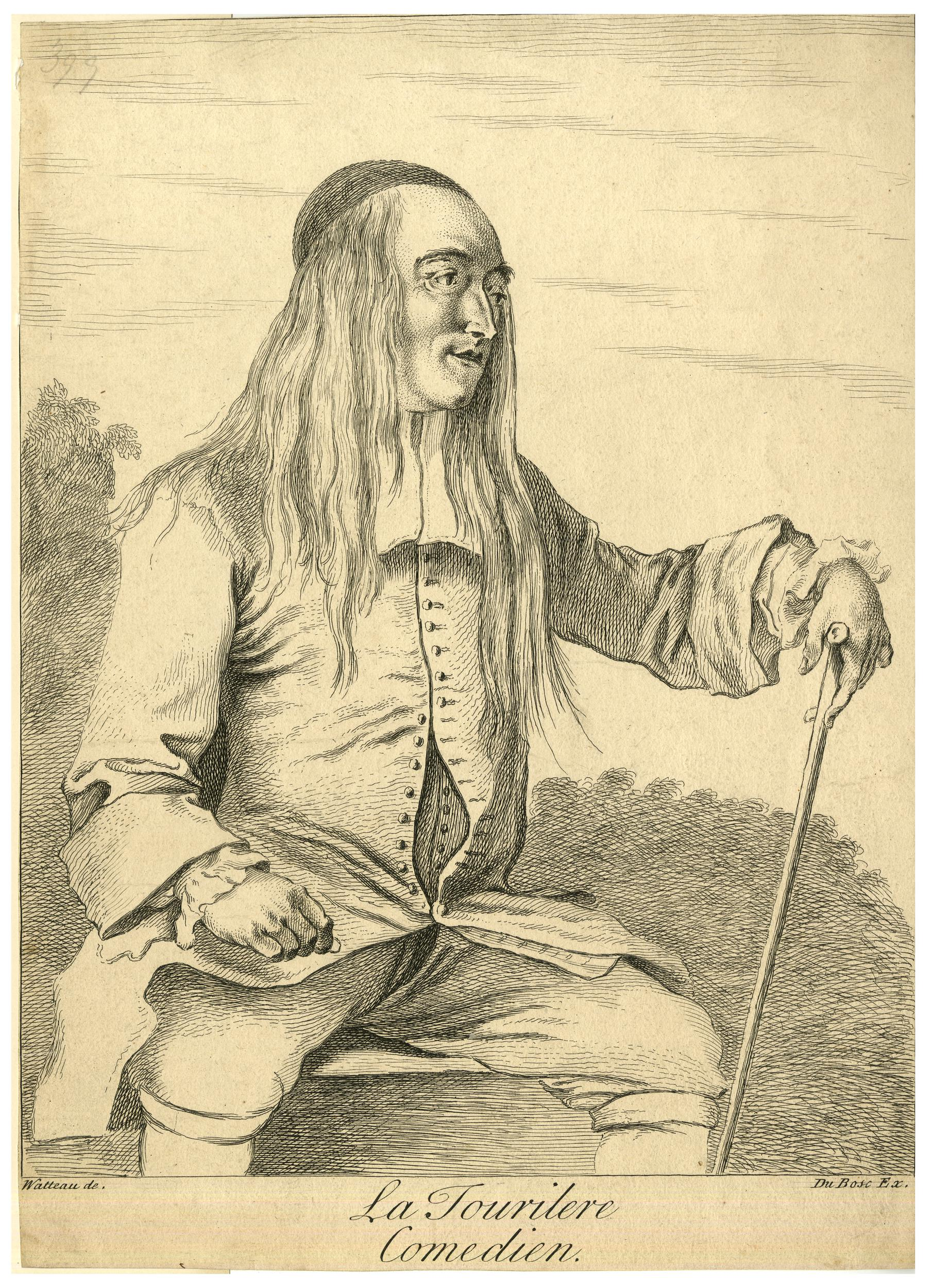
Claude Du Bosc after Boucher, La Tourilere comédien, 1730s, etching; British Museum, London

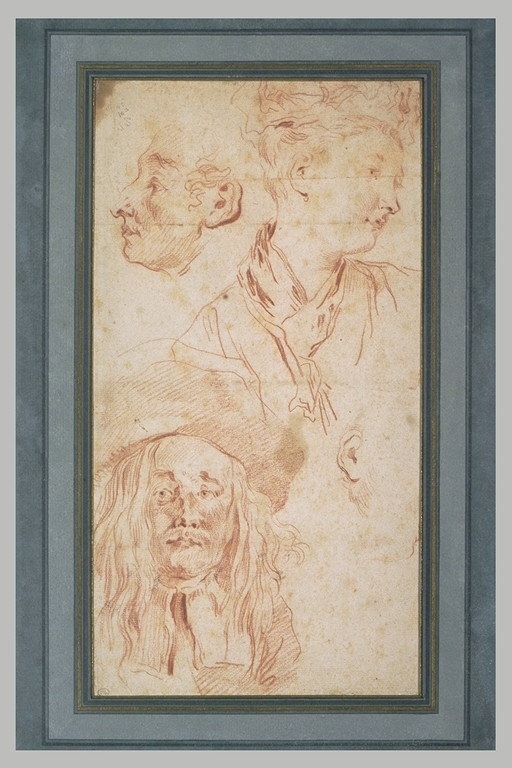
Copy after Watteau, Sheet of Various Studies, sanguine; Louvre, Paris

== Identity of the sitter ==
Aside from Goncourt's notes, it is thought that in an 1896 article published in Gazette des Beaux-Arts, the playwright and poet Gaston Schéfer was the first to try and identify the sitter of the drawings, available to him through Boucher's etchings. In a copy of the Figures de différents caractères held by the Bibliothèque de l'Arsenal, Schéfer discovered that the impression of folio 198 has an inscription by eighteenth-century hand, thought to be that of Pierre-Jean Mariette, saying "Portrait de l'abbé Larancher (struck-through) Haranger Chanoine de Saint-Germain-l'Auxerrois, ami de Watteau." From the inscription, Schéfer suggested that while the attire appears to be a theatrical one, the sitter was actually a priest, namely the Abbé Pierre-Maurice Haranger (ca. 1655–1735), canon at the Saint-Germain l'Auxerrois who was one of Watteau's closest friends. (Note: Since 1681, Abbé Pierre-Maurice Haranger (also spelled Harancher and Harenger; ca. 1655 – May 10, 1735) served as sub-deacon in the diocese of Paris and canon at the Saint-Germain l'Auxerrois, located close to the Louvre Palace, the seat of the Royal Academy of Painting and Sculpture. The inventory taken after Haranger's death, discovered and published by Jeannine Baticle in the mid-1980s, shows his taste of furniture and paintings, as well as his relationship with Watteau, for whom Haranger arranged the final home at Nogent-sur-Marne. The inventory also questioned the generally accepted theory, based on Edme-François Gersaint's account, that Watteau had divided his drawings among the Abbé Haranger, Jean Jullienne, Gersaint, and royal councilor Nicolas Henin; instead, it confirms the account given in Antoine de Laroque's obituary published in the August 1721 issue of Mercure de France, according to which Watteau left the most of drawings in his possession to the Abbé. Haranger's collection, that included two paintings by Watteau, The Worried Lover and The Dreamer, also estimated about thousand drawings by the artist; upon the Abbé's death, it has been sold by his relatives.) It has been stated by Schéfer that to Watteau, it was not a controversial thing to depict a Catholic priest wearing an unusual attire, for it wasn't so to the Church; Schéfer provides a similar example of Charles-Nicolas Cochin who produced a drawing of his priest friend, the Abbé François-Emmanuel Pommyer, wearing a peasant dress. Aware of Du Bosc's print, Schéfer said that the priest's appearance was fine enough to make one confuse him with an actor; it has also been presumed by Schéfer that a study of Haranger, similar to the Berlin sheet, was probably used for the rightmost figure in a painting by Watteau, The Coquettes.

In the 1920s, Schéfer's point was objected by Émile Dacier, Albert Vuaflart and Jacques Herold — the group behind the four-volume study of prints after Watteau's paintings; Dacier, Vuaflart, and Herold suggested that Watteau would hardly had an intention to depict a priest in what the scholars supposed to be a peasant or theatrical dress. In contrary to Schéfer's attribution that was based on a hand-written inscription, they relied on the engraved inscription from Du Bosc's copy after Boucher that claimed the Comédie-Française player Pierre Le Noir, sieur de la Thorillière (1659–1731), (Note: Pierre Le Noir, sieur de la Thorillière (September 3, 1659 — September 18, 1731), also called La Thorillière Jr. or La Thorillière fils, was the son of François Le Noir, sieur de La Thorillière, a prominent actor associated with Molière’s company. He joined the latter in 1671 as a touring player, and passed into the Comédie-Française following its establishment in 1680; in 1684, Le Noir became a sociétaire of the Comédie-Française. Early in his career, Le Noir performed secondary tragic and comic characters, before going to a greater success into à manteau roles he played following the company-mate Jean-Baptiste Raisin's death in 1693. In November 1685, Le Noir had married Caterina Biancolelli, the Columbina of the original Comédie-Italienne and daughter of Domenico Bianconelli, the said troupe's Harlequin; he was also the brother-in-law to his company-mate, the playwright and actor Dancourt. Le Noir made his last stage appearance in August 1731, shortly before his death a month later; he was succeeded by the son, Anne-Maurice Le Noir.) to be the sitter. These objections caused a debate among Watteau scholars, noticeably complicated by the lack of surviving and/or authentic portraits of both supposed sitters; (Note: During the Watteau tercentenary exhibition in 1984–1985, Grasselli stated that "[… ]portraits of neither La Thorillière nor Haranger are known;" nonetheless, there are numerous artwork from the late 17th to the mid-19th centuries, associated with both of the supposed sitters. For the Abbé Haranger, it is known that in 1684, he sat for a portrait by Hyacinthe Rigaud; however, that portrait was not present in the Abbé's inventory. In the early 20th century, a portrait of priest attributed once to Watteau and later to Nicolas Lancret, now in the National Museum of Fine Arts, Algiers, has been claimed to be a depiction of the Abbé Haranger. For La Thorillière, it has been claimed by the 19th-century etcher Frédéric-Désiré Hillemacher that his portrait etching of the actor, published in the 1858 book La Troupe de Molière, was made after an oil painting by Watteau's master, Claude Gillot; aside from Hillemacher's etching, a pastel portrait of La Thorillière was cited in Iconographie Moliéresque (1876). It has also been said by Paulette Choné that an etching after a costume sketch by Gillot, though captioned as depicting La Thorillière Sr., was actually supposed to depict La Thorillière Jr.) part of scholars accepted Schéfer's attribution, while some other authors have adopted Dacier and Vuaflart's one.

== Exhibition history ==
List of exhibitions featuring the work
Year	Title	Location	Cat. no.
1950	Le dessin français de Fouquet à Cezanne	Musée de l'Orangerie, Paris	60
1984–1985	Watteau 1684–1721	National Gallery of Art, Washington, D.C.; Galeries nationales du Grand Palais, Paris; Charlottenburg Palace, Berlin	D. 72
2011	Watteau: The Drawings	Royal Academy of Arts, London	86
General references: Grasselli, Rosenberg & Parmantier 1984, p. 142.

== Sources ==
- Baticle, Jeannine (1985). "Le chanoine Haranger, ami de Watteau". Revue de l'Art (in French). 69 (69): 55–61. doi:10.3406/rvart.1985.347524. ISBN 2-222-96-415-6. ISSN 0035-1326 – via Persee.fr.
- Brookner, Anita (February 1985). "Review: Antoine Watteau, 1684-1721. Paris". The Burlington Magazine. 127 (983): 117–118. JSTOR 882026.
- Dacier, Émile (December 10, 1921). "Autour de Watteau (II)". Le Bulletin de l'art ancien et moderne (680): 213–216 – via the Internet Archive.
- Dacier, Émile; Vuaflart, Albert (1922). Jean de Julienne et les graveurs de Watteau au XVIII-e siècle. III. Catalogue (in French). Paris: M. Rousseau. p. 141. doi:10.11588/DIGLIT.41977. OCLC 1039156495.
- Fourcaud, Louis de (November 1901). "Antoine Watteau. VI. — L'invention sentimentale, l'effort technique et les pratiques de composition et d'exécution de Watteau (Suite)". La Revue de l'art ancien et moderne. 10 (56): 337–349 – via the Internet Archive.
- Gillet, Louis (1921). Watteau: un grand maître du XVIIIe siècle. Paris: Plon. p. 90. OCLC 1102350703 – via the Internet Archive.
- Glorieux, Guillaume (2002). À l'enseigne de Gersaint: Edme-François Gersaint, marchand d'art sur le pont Notre-Dame (1694-1750). Seysell: Editions Champ Vallon. p. 431. ISBN 2-87673-344-7. OCLC 401692541 – via Google Books.
- Goncourt, Edmond de (1875). Catalogue raisonné de l'oeuvre peint, dessiné et gravé d'Antoine Watteau. Paris: Rapilly. p. 72, cat. no. 74 (on Du Bosc's print); p. 253, cat. no. 424 (on folio 69 of the Figures de différents caractères and the original drawing); p. 283, cat. no. 575 (on folio 198 of the Figures de différents caractères). OCLC 1041772738 – via the Internet Archive.
- Goncourt, Edmond de; Goncourt, Jules de (1880) [1860]. L'art du dix-huitième siècle. 1^{er} fasc.: Watteau (3rd ed.). Paris: A. Quantin. p. 55. OCLC 1157138267 – via the Internet Archive.
- Grasselli, Margaret Morgan; Rosenberg, Pierre; Parmantier, Nicole; et al. (1984). Watteau, 1684-1721 (PDF) (exhibition catalogue). Washington: National Gallery of Art. ISBN 0-89468-074-9. OCLC 557740787 – via the National Gallery of Art archive.
- Grasselli, Margaret Morgan (1987). The Drawings of Antoine Watteau: Stylistic Development and Problems of Chronology (Thesis (Ph.D.)). Cambridge, MA: Harvard University. pp. 424–425, no. 312, fig. 514. OCLC 1110196330.
- Herold, Jacques; Vuaflart, Albert (1929). Jean de Julienne et les graveurs de Watteau au XVIII-e siècle. I. Notices et documents biographiques (in French). Paris: M. Rousseau. p. 117. doi:10.11588/DIGLIT.41975. OCLC 1039157338.
- Hildebrandt, Edmund (1923). Antoine Watteau (in German). Berlin: Propyläen-Verlag. pp. 73, 132; pl. 25. OCLC 1039987046 – via the Internet Archive.
- Josz, Virgile (1904). Antoine Watteau (in French). Paris: H. Piazza et cie. p. 181. OCLC 963518006 – via the Internet Archive.
- Lajer-Burcharth, Ewa (Winter 2015). "Drawing Time". October. 151 (151): 3–42. doi:10.1162/OCTO_a_00210. JSTOR 24586606. S2CID 57561064.
- Nemilova, Inna S. (1964). Ватто и его произведения в Эрмитаже (Watteau et son œuvre à l'Ermitage) [Watteau and His Works in the Hermitage] (in Russian). Leningrad: Sovetskiy hudozhnik. OCLC 67871342.
- Parker, Karl T. & Mathey, Jacques (1957–1958). Antoine Watteau: catalogue complet de son oeuvre dessiné. Paris: F. de Nobèle. vol. 2, p. 378, cat. no. 914. OCLC 2039948.
- Parker, Karl T. (1970) [1931]. The Drawings of Antoine Watteau. New York: Hacker Art Books. pp. 21, 47. ISBN 0-87817-050-2. OCLC 680613312 – via the Internet Archive.
- Pilon, Edmond (1912). Watteau et son école (in French). Bruxelles etc.: G. van Oest & cie. p. 40. OCLC 1158281157 – via the Internet Archive.
- Roland Michel, Marianne (1984). Watteau: an Artist of the Eighteenth Century. London: Trefoil. pp. 55, 135, 173, 253, pl. 30, 270, 271. ISBN 0-86294-049-4. OCLC 1302554747 – via the Internet Archive.
- Rosenberg, Pierre & Prat, Louis-Antoine (1996). Antoine Watteau: catalogue raisonné des dessins (in French). Paris: Gallimard-Electa. vol. 2, pp. 1116–1117, cat. no. 653. ISBN 2-07-015043-7. OCLC 463981169.
- Rosenberg, Pierre (2001). From Drawing to Painting : Poussin, Watteau, Fragonard, David, & Ingres. Princeton, NJ: Princeton University Press. p. 31, fig. 29. ISBN 069100918X – via the Internet Archive.
- Rosenberg, Pierre; Prat, Louis-Antoine & Eidelberg, Martin (2011). Watteau: The Drawings (exhibition catalogue). London: Royal Academy of Arts. cat. no. 86. ISBN 9781905711703. OCLC 740683643.
- Schéfer, Gaston (September 1896). "Les Portraits dans l'oeuvre de Watteau". Gazette des Beaux-Arts (in French) (471): 177–189 – via the Internet Archive.
- Toney, Anthony, ed. (1963). 150 Masterpieces of Drawing. New York: Dover. p. XIV, pl. 118. OCLC 1145793764 – via the Internet Archive.
- Zolotov, Yuri K. [in Russian], ed. (1973). Антуан Ватто [Antoine Watteau] (album and catalogue) (in Russian). Leningrad: Aurora. p. 139. OCLC 46947007.
- Zolotov, Yuri, ed. (1985). Antoine Watteau: Paintings and Drawings from Soviet Museums. Translated from the Russian by Vladimir Pozner. Leningrad: Aurora Publishers. p. 98. OCLC 249485317.
