= Nicholas Blakey =

Irish-born draughtsman and engraver

Nicholas Blakey (died 20 November 1758) was an Irish-born draughtsman and engraver. He produced book illustrations, and designed early examples of scenes from English history.

== Life ==
Blakey's early life is not known; born in Ireland, he is known to be studying in Paris in 1747. He developed a late rococo style.

He was a designer and sometimes engraver of book illustrations, collaborating with others including Louis Peter Boitard, Charles Grignion the Elder and Simon François Ravenet. His earliest published designs appear in Bernhard Siegfried Albinus's Tables of the Skeleton and Muscles of the Human Body (1749).

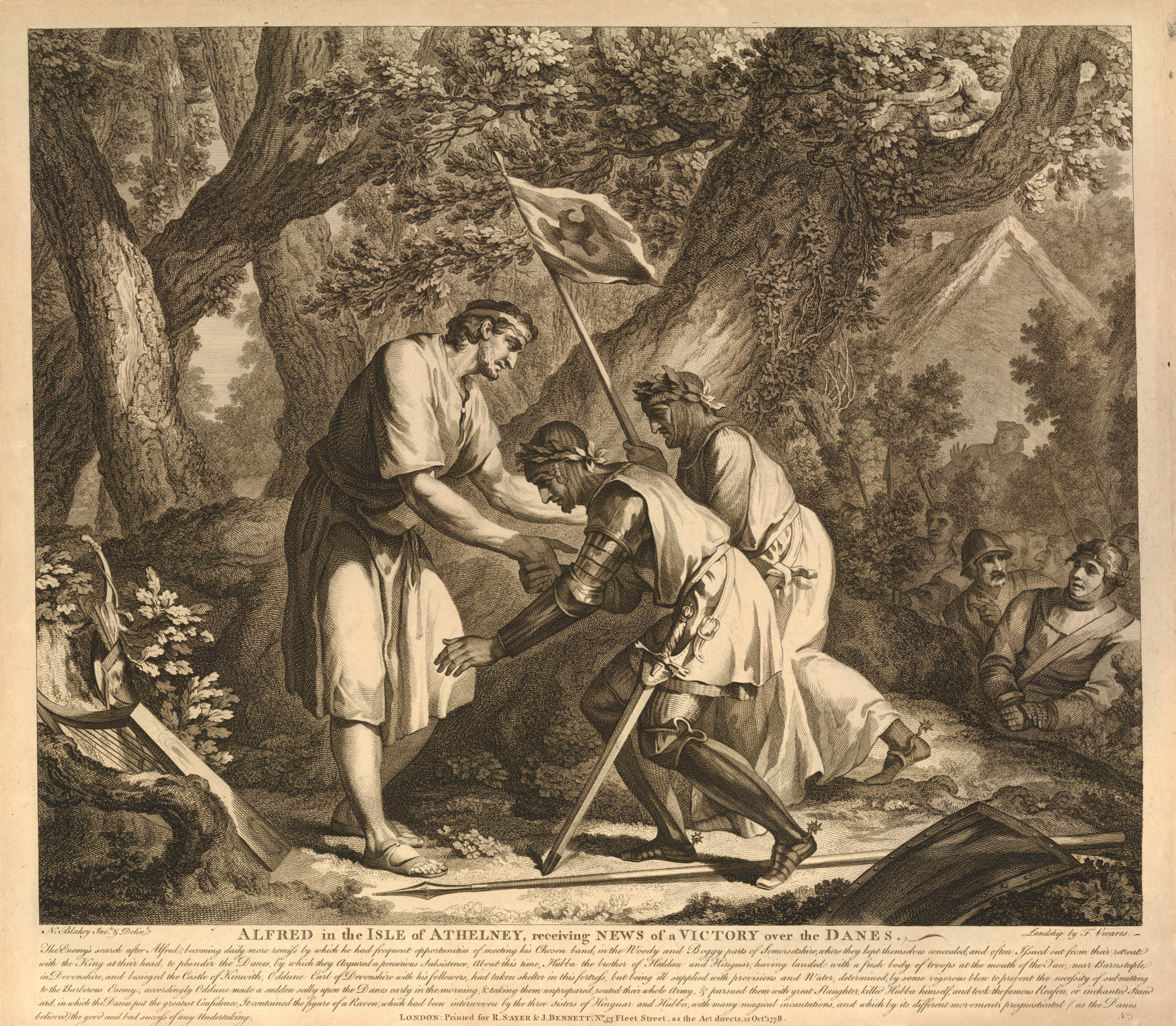
"Alfred in the Island of Athelney, receiving News of a Victory over the Danes". Engraving by Nicholas Blakey, reworked by François Vivares

Working with the painter Francis Hayman, he designed and engraved plates for an edition of Alexander Pope's works (1751), and for Jonas Hanway's An Historical Account of the British Trade over the Caspian Sea (1753).

Also with Francis Hayman he contributed to a set of prints, published as English History Delineated (1750–52); these were commissioned in 1750 by the publishers John and Paul Knapton and Robert Dodsley. These large-scale scenes were a notable early example of illustrations of important moments in English history. Blakey was the designer of "The Landing of Julius Caesar", "Vortigern and Rowena" and "Alfred in the Island of Athelney, receiving News of a Victory over the Danes".

Blakey died in Paris in 1758, survived by his wife Elizabeth.
