= Dead Rabbits riot =

1857 gang riot in New York City

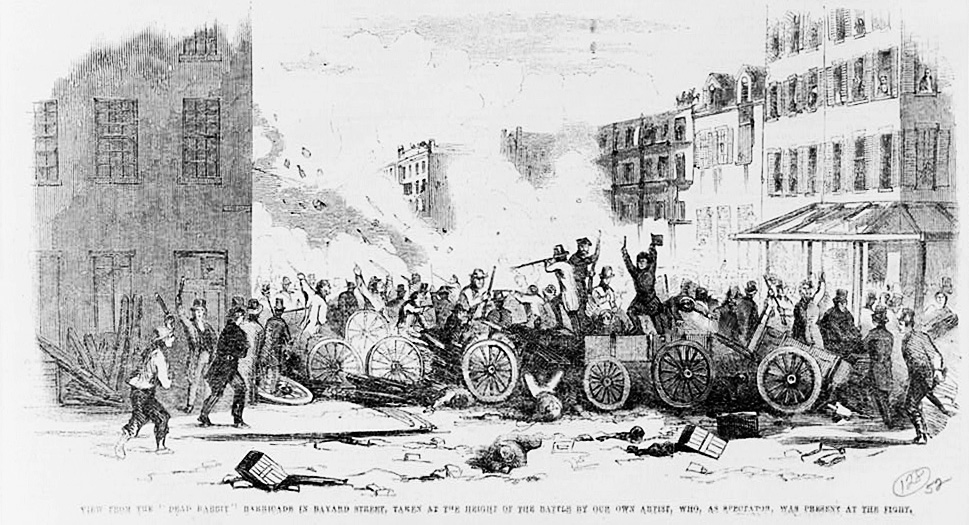
- A view of the ferocious fight between two gangs, the "Dead Rabbits" and the "Bowery Boys", in the Bowery, New York City
- Date: July 4–5, 1857
- Attack type: Riot
- Deaths: 8
- Injuries: 30–100 injured
- Perpetrators: Dead Rabbits and Bowery Boys

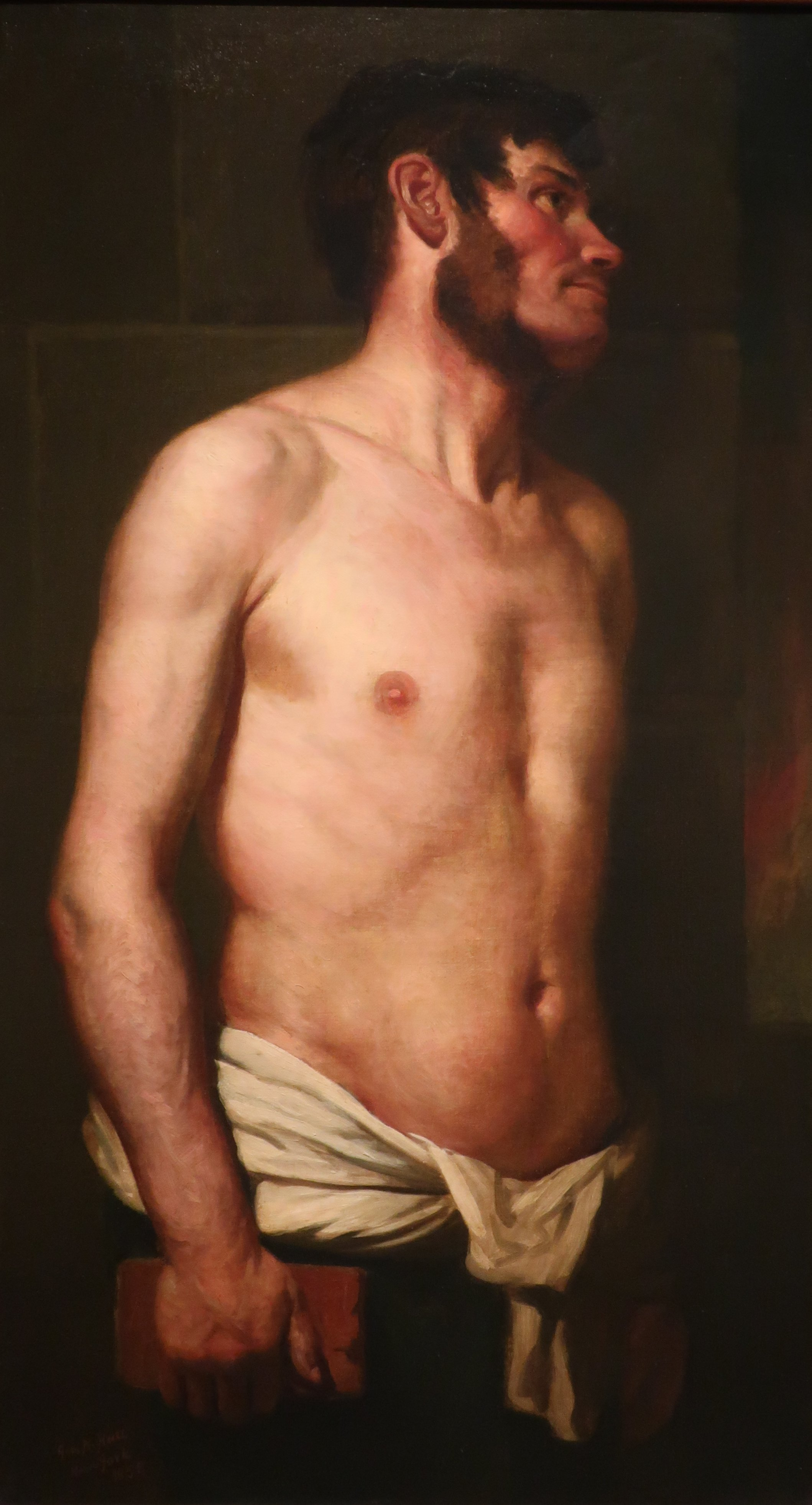
George Henry Hall, A Dead Rabbit, 1858. Also entitled Study of the Nude, or Study of an Irishman, it depicts a man meant to represent one of the Dead Rabbits gang members from the Dead Rabbits Riot of July 4, 1857 in New York City's Lower East Side slums.

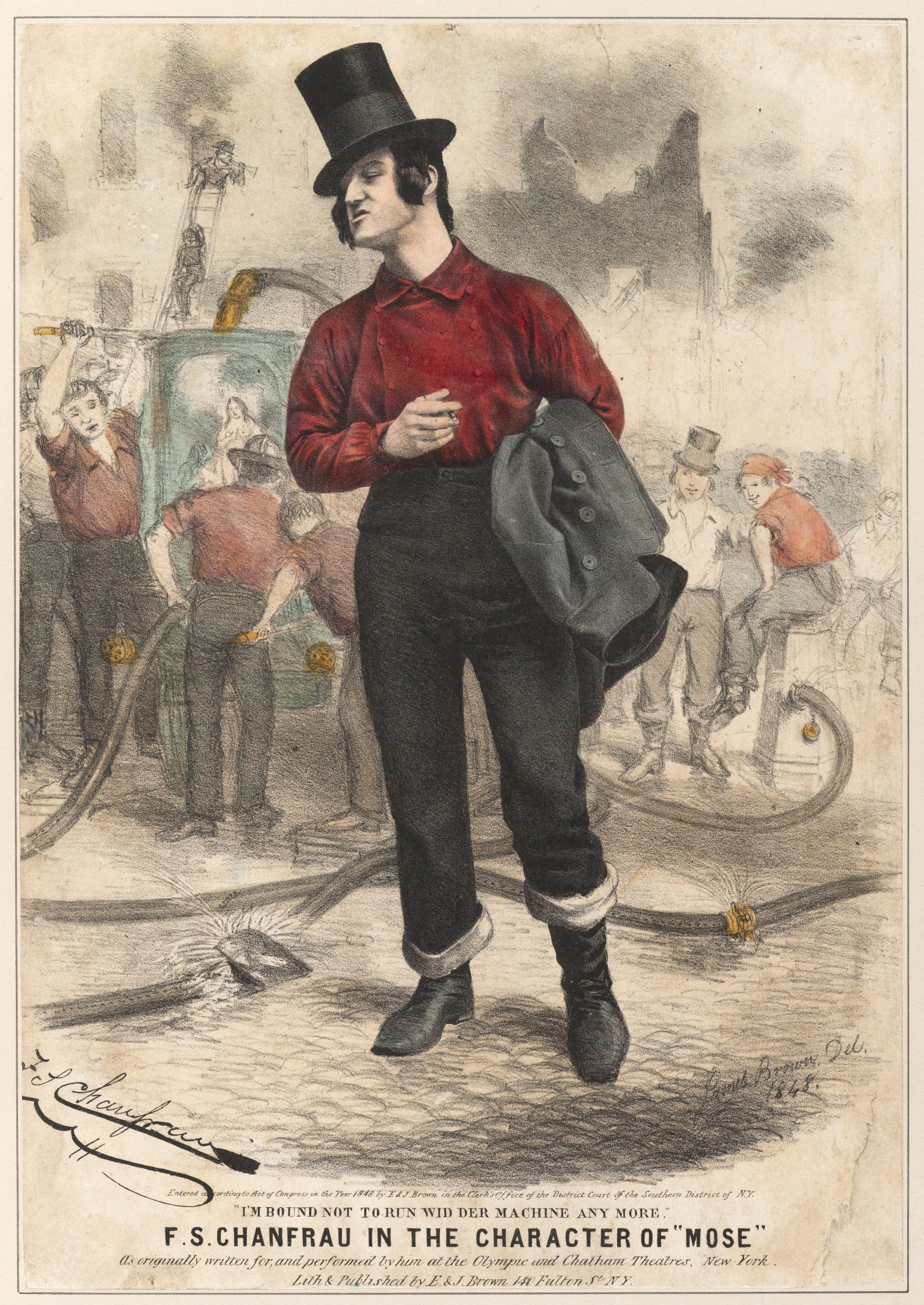
The Nativist New York City criminal gang the Bowery Boys, the archenemies of the Irish Dead Rabbits gang, wore firemen uniforms (being volunteer firefighters) and black stovepipe top hats to show their gang colors and pro-American affiliation.

Police Officer Shangles, an 1857 New York City Policeman during the Dead Rabbits Riot.

The Dead Rabbits riot was a two-day civil disturbance in New York City evolving from what was originally a small-scale brawl between members of the Dead Rabbits and the Bowery Boys into a citywide gang war, which occurred July 4–5, 1857. Taking advantage of the disorganized state of the city's police force—brought about by the conflict between the Municipal and Metropolitan police—the fighting spiraled into widespread looting and damage of property by gangsters and other criminals from all parts of the city. It is estimated that between 800 and 1,000 gang members took part in the riots, along with several hundred others who used the disturbance to loot the Bowery area. It was the largest disturbance since the Astor Place Riot in 1849 and the biggest scene of gang violence until the New York Draft Riots of 1863. Order was restored by the New York State Militia, supported by detachments of city police, under Major-General Charles W. Sandford.

== Events ==
On the evening of July 4, 1857, while the rest of New York was celebrating Independence Day, members of the Dead Rabbits led a coalition of street gangs from the Five Points (with the exception of the Roach Guards with whom they had been fighting) into The Bowery to raid a clubhouse occupied by the Bowery Boys and the Atlantic Guards. They were confronted outside the building by their rivals and were driven back to Paradise Square after vicious street fighting.

Altercations continued as far away as Pearl and Chatham Streets, in the northern half of Park Row, but no police were dispatched. With the exception of a few nearby Metropolitan patrolmen, who were seriously injured, each police faction claimed the responsibility lay with the other. Police inactivity caused the situation to escalate in the next few hours.

The following morning, the Five Pointers returned to the Bowery with the Roach Guards and attacked the Green Dragon, a popular Broome Street resort and meeting place for the Bowery Boys and other local criminals. They managed to surprise the Bowery gangsters inside the building, and armed with iron bars and large paving blocks, they proceeded to wreck the bar room, rip up the floor of the dance hall, and drink all the alcohol in the place. News of the incident quickly reached the Bowery Boys, who then called upon other gangs of the Bowery to join them and confronted the Five Pointers at Bayard Street, where one of the largest street gang battles in the city's history occurred.

At around 10:00 a.m., amid savage fighting, a lone patrolman bravely used his club to move through the gangsters in an attempt to take the ring leaders into custody. He was knocked down and attacked by the crowd, stripped of his uniform, and beaten with his own nightstick. He managed to crawl back to the sidewalk, and wearing only his cotton drawers, he ran towards the Metropolitan headquarters on White Street, where he informed the precinct of the fighting before he collapsed.

A small police squad was sent out to break up the fighting, but upon reaching Centre Street, the gangs turned against the police, who were forced to retreat after several officers were injured. They made a second attempt, this time fighting their way into the mob, and arrested two men believed to be the leaders. The gangsters responded by storming into the low houses lining The Bowery and Bayard Street, forcing residents out, and climbed to the rooftops, where they proceeded to shower the Metropolitan officers with stones and brickbats until they fled from the area.

Brickbats, stones and clubs were flying thickly around, and from the windows in all directions, and the men ran wildly about brandishing firearms. Wounded men lay on the sidewalks and were trampled upon. Now the Rabbits would make a combined rush and force their antagonists up Bayard street to the Bowery. Then the fugitives, being reinforced, would turn on their pursuers and compel a retreat to Mulberry, Elizabeth and Baxter streets.

— The New York Times July 6, 1857

When the police left without their prisoners, the fighting stopped for a few moments. The truce lasted only an hour or two as fighting resumed near The Tombs, supposedly brought about by a group of women from the Five Points who had provoked the Dead Rabbits into attacking the Bowery gangs. Bringing reinforcements, the participants were estimated at between 800 and 1000, armed with bludgeons, paving stones, brickbats, axes, pitchforks, and other weapons. Several hundred other criminals also arrived in the area, mostly burglars and thieves, who were not affiliated with either side and simply took the opportunity for looting. Residents and store owners all along the Bowery were forced to barricade their buildings and protect themselves with pistols and muskets.

Fighting continued until early afternoon, when a larger police force arrived, sent by Police Commissioner Simeon Draper, and marched in close formation towards the mob. After hard fighting, they cleared the streets, forcing both the Dead Rabbits and the Bowery Boys into the buildings and to the rooftops once again. The police followed the gangsters, using their clubs at every opportunity, and began arresting large numbers of men. Some refused to surrender to police, such as one man who, while fighting police, fell off the roof of a Baxter Street tenement fracturing his skull. He was promptly killed by Bowery gangsters on the ground, who stomped him to death. Two leaders of the Dead Rabbits were finally arrested by police despite heavy resistance from fellow gang members. The police took them to a nearby police precinct followed by a group of Bowery Boys.

Fighting resumed as soon as the police left. Barricades were set up with push carts and stones from which gangsters fired weapons, hurled bricks, and used clubs against their enemies. At one point, a Dead Rabbit stepped in front of his barricade and used his pistol to kill two Bowery Boys and wound two others despite heavy fire. He was finally knocked unconscious, reportedly by a small boy whose brother was a Bowery Boy.

The police returned to the area but were unable to re-enter and were forced to retreat several times with heavy losses. That evening, they called upon Captain Isaiah Rynders to use his influence to stop the battle. Rynders, the political boss of the Sixth Ward, was long associated with the underworld, and it was thought that he could force them to stop. He agreed, and upon his arrival between 6:00 and 7:00 p.m., he addressed the gangsters from the barricades. Although he tried to reason with them by telling them the futility of fighting, they refused to listen, and Rynders was forced to escape into the company of his henchmen, when the mob responded by throwing rocks at him. He then traveled to the Metropolitan Police Headquarters where he advised Draper to call in the military. Meanwhile, fires had been set to two or three houses while residents remained under siege by looters and thugs.

At around 9:00 p.m., the Eighth and the Seventy-First Regiments of the New York State Militia under Major-General Charles W. Sandford marched down White and Worth Streets with fixed bayonets. Accompanied by two police detachments of 75 men each, they moved ahead of the guardsmen, clubbing gangsters and rioters. Although neither regiment was at full strength, the show of force was enough to panic the gangsters to flee back to their hideouts. The fighting ceased, with 500 men remaining at the City Arsenal until 4:00 a.m., although police and national guardsmen continued to patrol the district into the next day.

=== Historical accuracy ===
American historian Tyler Anbinder claims that there is no evidence of a Dead Rabbits gang existing, and that the alleged organization was a misnomer for the Roach Guards. In Anbinder's telling of events, in the aftermath of a gang war between the Bowery Boys and the Roach Guards, reporters relied heavily on the Bowery Boys for information. The Bowery Boys likely tarred the Roach Guards with the slang term "dead Rabbit party", referring to thieves, and the press continued using the term despite Five Points locals expressing incredulity at the unfamiliar name. Anbinder writes that "there seems to be no justification for referring to the Bowery Boys' adversaries by [the name Dead Rabbits]."

== Aftermath ==
During the two days, eight men were killed and between thirty and a hundred others injured, roughly half requiring hospitalization. It was believed that many gang members were carried off by their friends and, over the next few days, those who were killed in the fighting were buried in cellars, hidden passageways, and other locations in the Five Points and Paradise Square. Many known "sluggers" from both sides were noticeably absent from the area following the riot. According to underworld legend, these sites would be used for secret burials by street gangs for the next several decades.

Afterwards, occasional violence against Bowery Boys who ventured into the Five Points was reported, although none of these attacks reached the levels seen during the riots. The most serious incident occurred the next day, when a group of Bowery Boys fought members of the Kerryonians in Centre Street, but they were chased back to the Bowery and Chatham Square by the time police arrived. Sporadic fighting continued for another week, most being confined in German-American neighborhoods (Little Germany) in the East Side and the East River by younger criminals emulating the Irish gangs.

Many of the Five Points gangs, most notably the Dead Rabbits, resented the implications made by police and newspapers that they had been involved in criminal activity. The Dead Rabbits paid for a letter to The New York Times, denying those assertions.

We are requested by the Dead Rabbits to state that the Dead Rabbit club members are not thieves, that they did not participate in the riot with the Bowery Boys, and that the fight on Mulberry street was between the Roach Guards of Mulberry street and the Atlantic Guards of the Bowery. The Dead Rabbits are sensitive on points of Honor, we are assured, and wouldn't allow a thief to live on their beat, much less be a member of their club.

== In popular culture ==
=== In films and television ===
The Dead Rabbit Riot was featured in the History Channel documentary television series History's Mysteries in 1998. The story of the New York Dead Rabbits is told, in highly fictionalized form, in Martin Scorsese's 2002 film Gangs of New York, which was partially inspired by Herbert Asbury's 1928 nonfiction book Gangs of New York. In the 2014 film, Winter's Tale, the Dead Rabbits and the Short Tails are featured prominently; a similar theme pervades Mark Helprin's 1983 novel of the same name. The fourth season of the 2014 television series, Hell on Wheels has a few Dead Rabbit characters.

=== In literature ===
A book of poetry by Richard Griffin, The Dead Rabbit Riot, A.D. 1857: And Other Poems, was published in 1915. Patricia Beatty's 1987 historical children's fiction novel Charlie Skedaddle mentions Dead Rabbits (the main character is a Bowery Boy).

The riot of 1857 is dramatized (briefly) in Chapter XVIII of MacKinlay Kantor's Pulitzer Prize-winning novel "Andersonville" (1955).

=== In art ===
Artist George Henry Hall's 1858 painting is titled A Dead Rabbit (also entitled Study of the Nude or Study of an Irishman), which depicts a dead Dead Rabbit gang member killed during the riot on July 4, 1857, in New York City's Lower East Side.

== See also ==
- New York City draft riots
- Orange Riots
- History of New York City (1855–1897)
- New York City Police riot of 1857
- Tammany Hall
- List of incidents of civil unrest in New York City
- List of incidents of civil unrest in the United States
