= Gang colors =

Colors or insignia worn by gang members

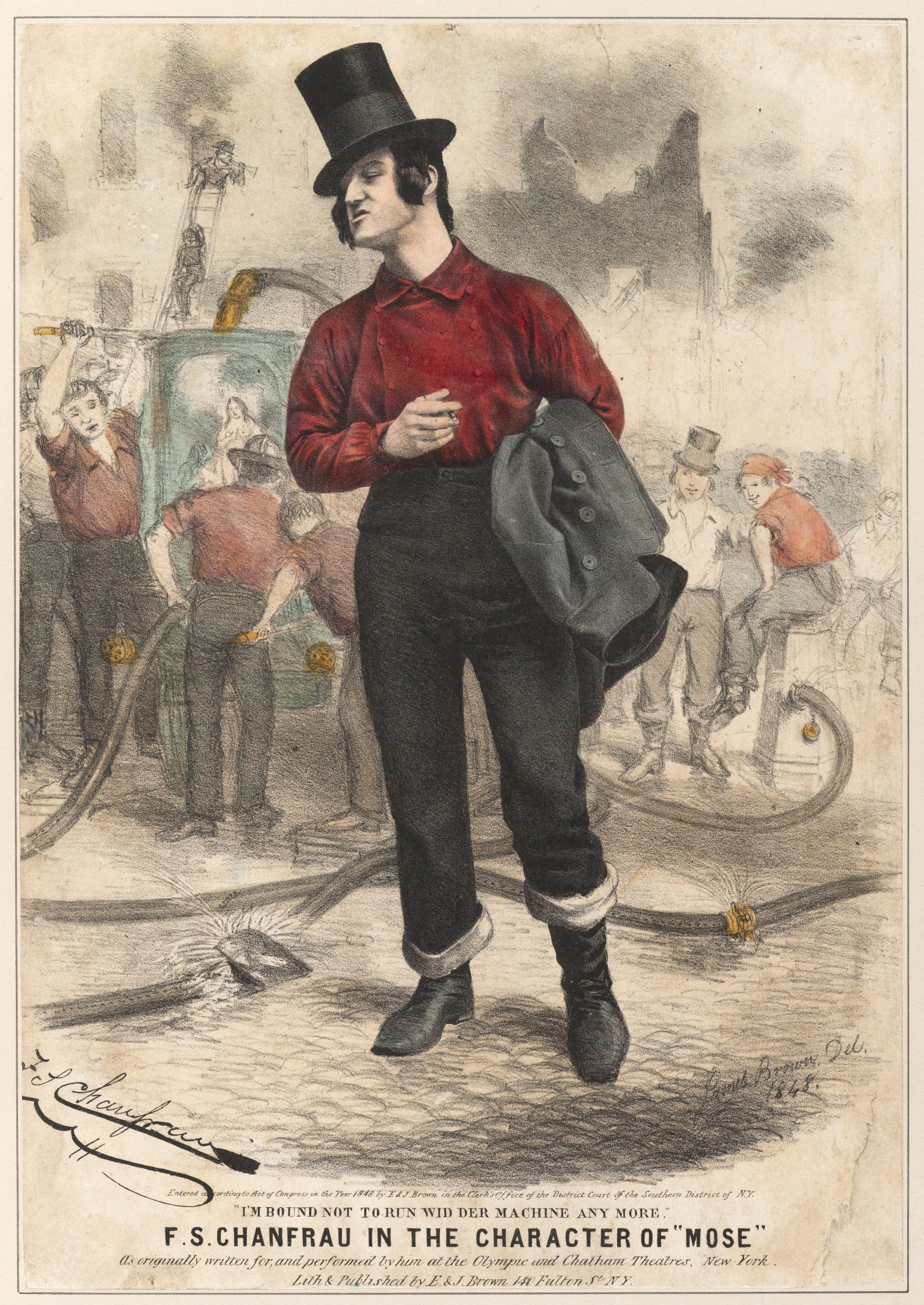
The Nativist New York City criminal gang the Bowery Boys from the 1820s–1860s wore firemen uniforms to show their gang colors and nativist, anti-Catholic, anti-Irish, volunteer firefighter affiliation.

Gang colors include clothing, accessories, or tattoos of a specific color or colors that represent an affiliation to a specific gang or gang branch.

== History ==
=== England ===
The first recorded criminal street gangs in England were organized in London in the early 1600s and identified and apprehended by an early form of British city police, the Bow Street Runners. Early urban gangs in London and other British cities of this period went by the names of the Muns, Mohocks, Hectors, Bawcubites, Bickers, Bugles, Blues, Bravadoes, Tittyre Tus, Tuquoques, Roysters, Scowrers, Dead Boys, Circling Boys, and Roaring Boys with each gang distinguishing its membership affiliation by using a different colored ribbon attached to their clothing.

=== United States ===
The earliest (1820s–1860s) criminal street gangs in the United States, who were in New York City and were politically aligned with one or the other of the two prominent political parties at the time—the anti-immigrant Nativist, Know Nothing Party, or the Irish immigrant-based Tammany Hall of the Democratic Party—wore distinctive gang colors to differentiate themselves from their allies and rivals. The most notorious and prominent of the New York gangs who could field 50–200 members per gang were the Nativist Bowery Boys, Atlantic Guards, and Plug Uglies versus the Irish American gangs of the Dead Rabbits, Roach Guards, and Shirt Tails.

The Roach Guards wore a blue stripe on their trousers and the Atlantic Guards and Dead Rabbits wore a red trouser stripe. The Bowery Boys wore neckerchiefs, red shirts, tall stove pipe hats, long, black, frock coats, and trousers tucked into high heel calf boots to identify them with their New York City Fire Department volunteer fire company origins and Nativist affiliations.

== Types of colors ==
=== Bandanas ===
The most recognizable form of gang affiliation is based on color. Bandanas come in a wide range of colors and can be paired with other pieces of clothing to represent all colors of the gang. Not only are bandanas an easy way to show gang affiliation they are also easy to remove if the situation calls for it (i.e. if confronted by law enforcement). Gang members are known for wearing bandanas around their face as a mask, or in their pocket, with it sticking out.

== Today ==
=== Legal ramifications ===
The prevalence of gang colors has declined in popularity over the past few years. In order to crack down on gang related crimes, legislation has been passed to increase penalties for crimes committed by gangs or gang members. For example, in some states, if a gang member commits a Class A misdemeanor, the highest level misdemeanor crime, then that offense is classified as a felony because the individual is a member of a criminal street gang.

== See also ==
- Gang patch
- Colors (motorcycling)
- School colors
- Sports uniform
