= Kerryonians =

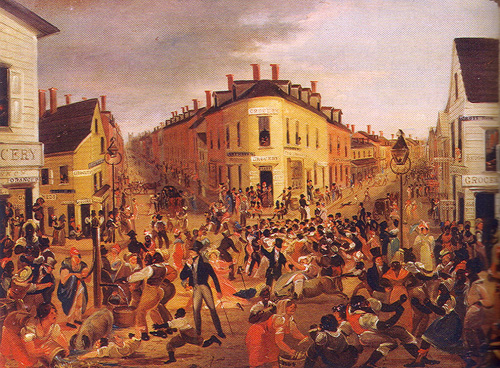
- George Catlin painting of the Five Points, Manhattan, New York City in 1827 the slum territory of the "Kerryonians" and the other Irish criminal gangs
- Founded by: Irish immigrants from County Kerry, Ireland
- Founding location: Five Points, Manhattan, New York City
- Years active: 1825-1830s
- Territory: Lower East Side, Manhattan, New York City
- Ethnicity: Irish
- Membership (est.): ?
- Criminal activities: street fighting, knife fighting, assault, murder, robbery
- Allies: Forty Thieves, Shirt Tails, Chichesters, Dead Rabbits, Tammany Hall
- Rivals: Bowery Boys, Forty Thieves, Pelters

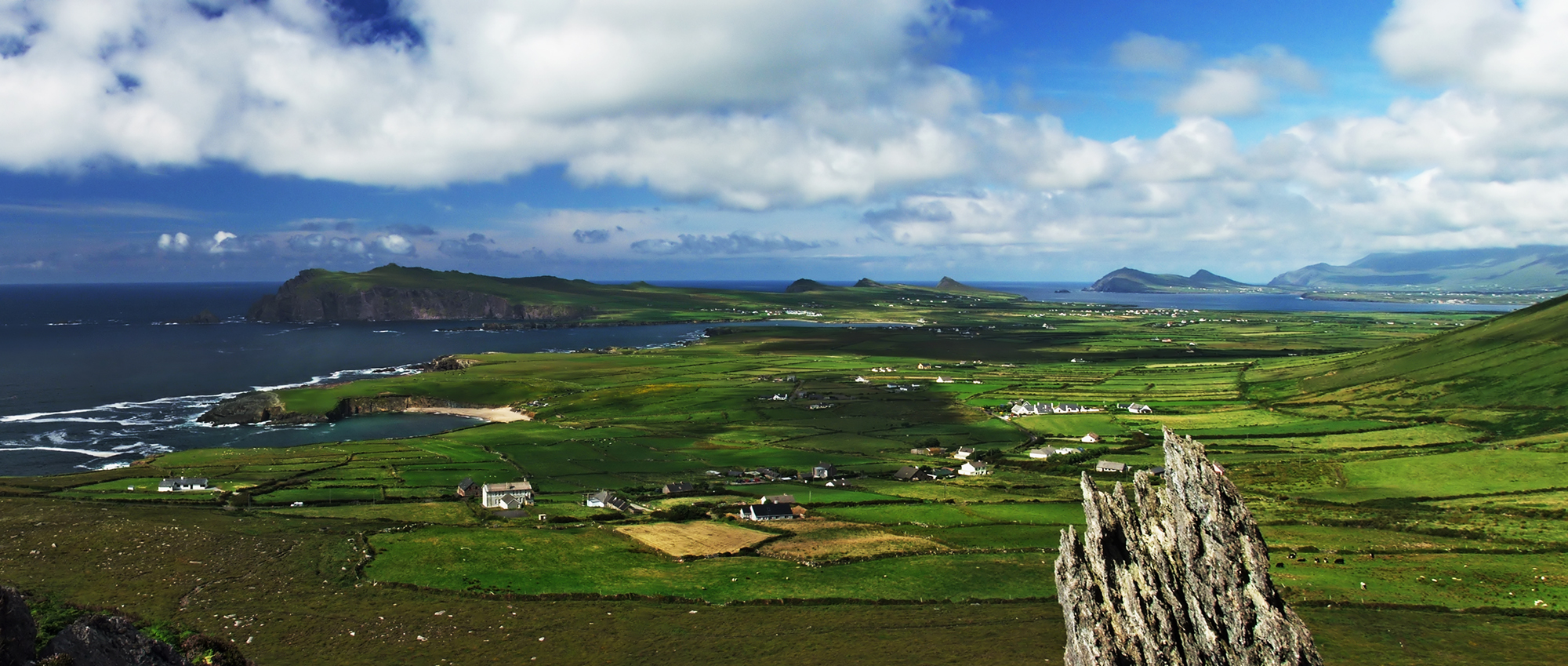
The Kerryonians gang were formed from New York City Irish immigrants who had emigrated from County Kerry, Ireland

The Kerryonians were the second oldest criminal street gang in New York City but may have been the first gang in the city. The members were made up of recent Irish immigrants from County Kerry, Ireland. There was also a 19th-century Philadelphia gang of the same name. Beginning in the 1820s, the Kerryonians were part of the first wave of the early New York gangs, following behind the first and oldest gang in the city, the Forty Thieves, to occupy the Five Points area. The Kerryonians were particularly fond of targeting New Yorkers who were of British descent. The Kerryonians also fought a gang named the "Pelters". They are most known however for disrupting British actor William Charles Macready's performance at Astor Place around 1849. The Kerryonians were eventually absorbed into the growing street gangs of Five Points such as the Dead Rabbits, Roach Guards, and Chichesters.
