= History of New York City (1855–1897) =

In 1855, Fernando Wood was inaugurated as the first mayor from Tammany Hall, beginning a time in the history of New York City notable for its domination by that institution. Reforms led to the New York City Police Riot of June 1857. There was chaos during the American Civil War, with major rioting in the New York Draft Riots. The Gilded Age brought about prosperity for the city's upper classes amid the further growth of a poor immigrant working class, as well as an increasing consolidation, both economic and municipal, of what would become the five boroughs in 1898.

Oceangoing steamships and steam railroads, developed in earlier decades, grew to take over most long-distance transport, bringing an ever-increasing stream of immigration and industrialization.

== Pre-Civil War ==
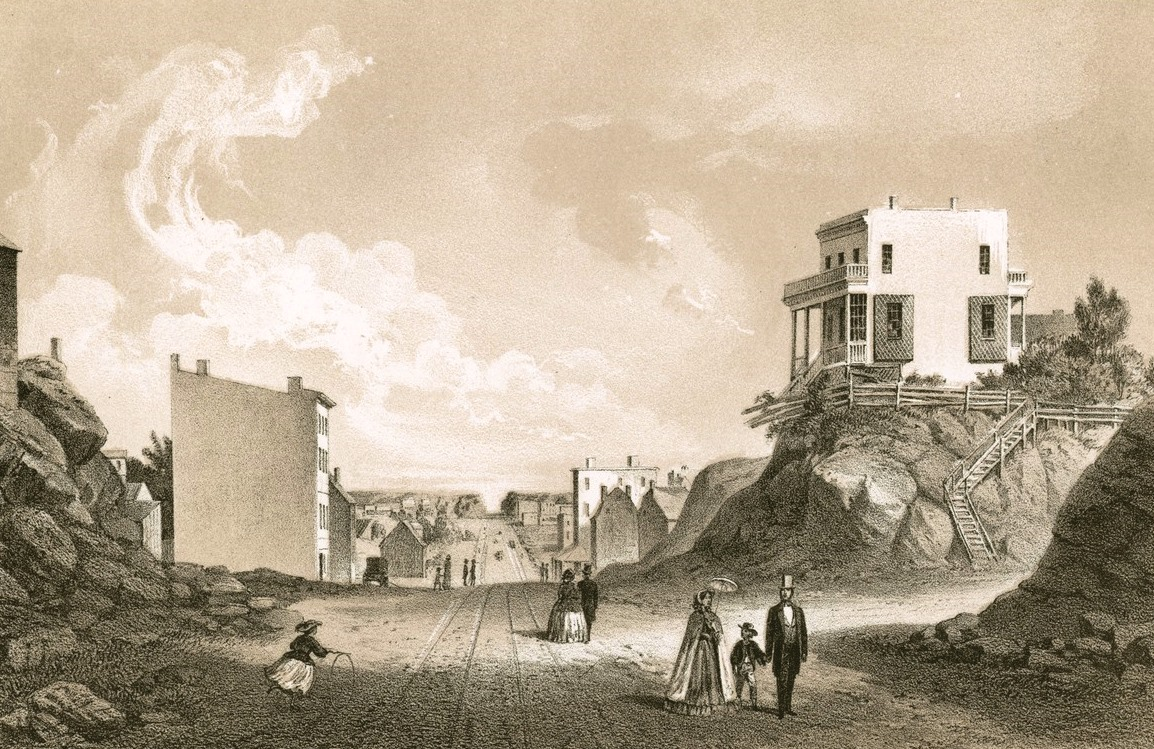
Second Avenue facing north from 42nd Street in 1861

=== Police, gangs and violence ===
The new Republican Party in the late 1850s attempted to cut the power of Mayor Fernando Wood and other pro-South Democrats by abolishing the New York City Municipal Police Department in favor of a Metropolitan Police District. Resistance resulted in the New York City Police Riot of 1857. While the police were busy with their feud, the Dead Rabbits Riot between two gangs in Five Points occurred in July, lasting two days, and was stopped only by intervention of the state militia. It was the worst riot in New York City up to that time. Historian Tyler Anbinder says the "Dead Rabbit" name "so captured the imagination of New Yorkers that the press continued to use it despite the abundant evidence that no such club or gang existed." Anbinder notes that, "for more than a decade, 'Dead Rabbit' became the standard phrase by which city residents described any scandalously riotous individual or group."

Historians such as Michael Kaplan and Elliott Gorn have argued that an intensifying highly masculine working-class male identity fostered gangs, brawling, and even homicide and rape, which was fueled by New York City taverns. The emerging male code emphasized physical courage, defiance of authority, and class pride. Irish and German immigrants brought European influences. Sexual harassment of women increased because women were more visible outside the home, as many worked in factories and shops. Women were regarded as depersonalized objects of lewd talk, and gang rapes became an opportunity for male bonding.

=== Staten Island Quarantine War ===
From 1800 to 1858, Staten Island was the location of the largest quarantine facility in the United States. Angry residents burned down the hospital compound in 1858 in a series of attacks known as the Staten Island Quarantine War. Although there were no deaths as a result of the attack, the arsonists completely destroyed the hospital compound.

== Central Park ==
Map of Central Park. Clicking on a feature in the picture causes the browser to load the appropriate article.

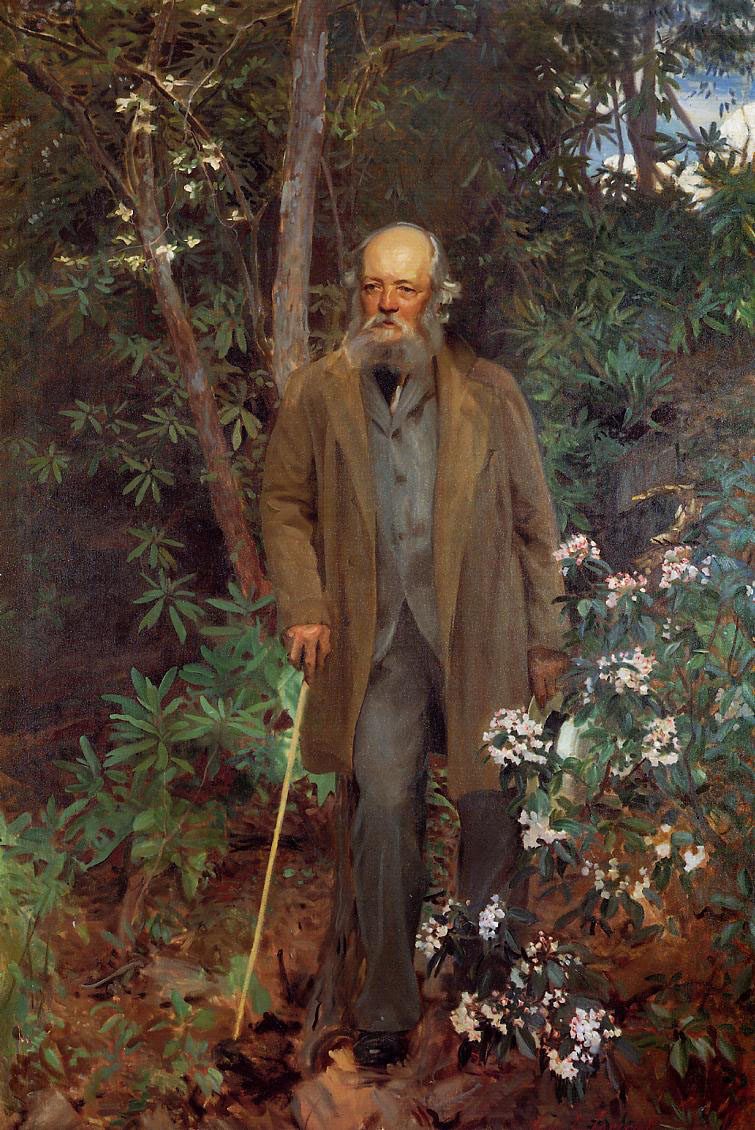
John Singer Sargent, Frederick Law Olmsted (1822–1903), (1895)

As the population grew explosively in Lower Manhattan after 1820, middle-class residents were drawn to the few existing open spaces, mainly cemeteries, to get away from the noises, smells, and chaotic life in the city. Landscape painter Asher Brown Durand and writer William Cullen Bryant, recalling their rural upbringing and the great parks of Europe, advocated the therapeutic value of nature in the overcrowded city. Along with architect Andrew Jackson Downing, they envisioned a great park. The state government in 1853 provided $5 million and eminent domain powers to buy out the land owners of what became Central Park. Egbert L. Viele drew the original plans, but Frederick Law Olmsted and Calvert Vaux made the final Greensward Plan design and have received the main credit.

Several American influences came together in the design. Landscaped rural cemeteries, such as Mount Auburn in Cambridge, Massachusetts, and Green-Wood Cemetery in Brooklyn, provided examples of idyllic, naturalistic landscapes. The most influential innovations in the Central Park design were the multiple circulation plans for pedestrians, horseback riders, and pleasure vehicles. The crossing routes for commercial traffic were concealed in sunken roadways screened with densely planted shrub belts so as to maintain a natural setting. It was the nation's first great urban park; Olmsted taught Americans a new sensibility in park environments and urban planning as an applied science with his radically naturalistic park design.

== Civil War ==
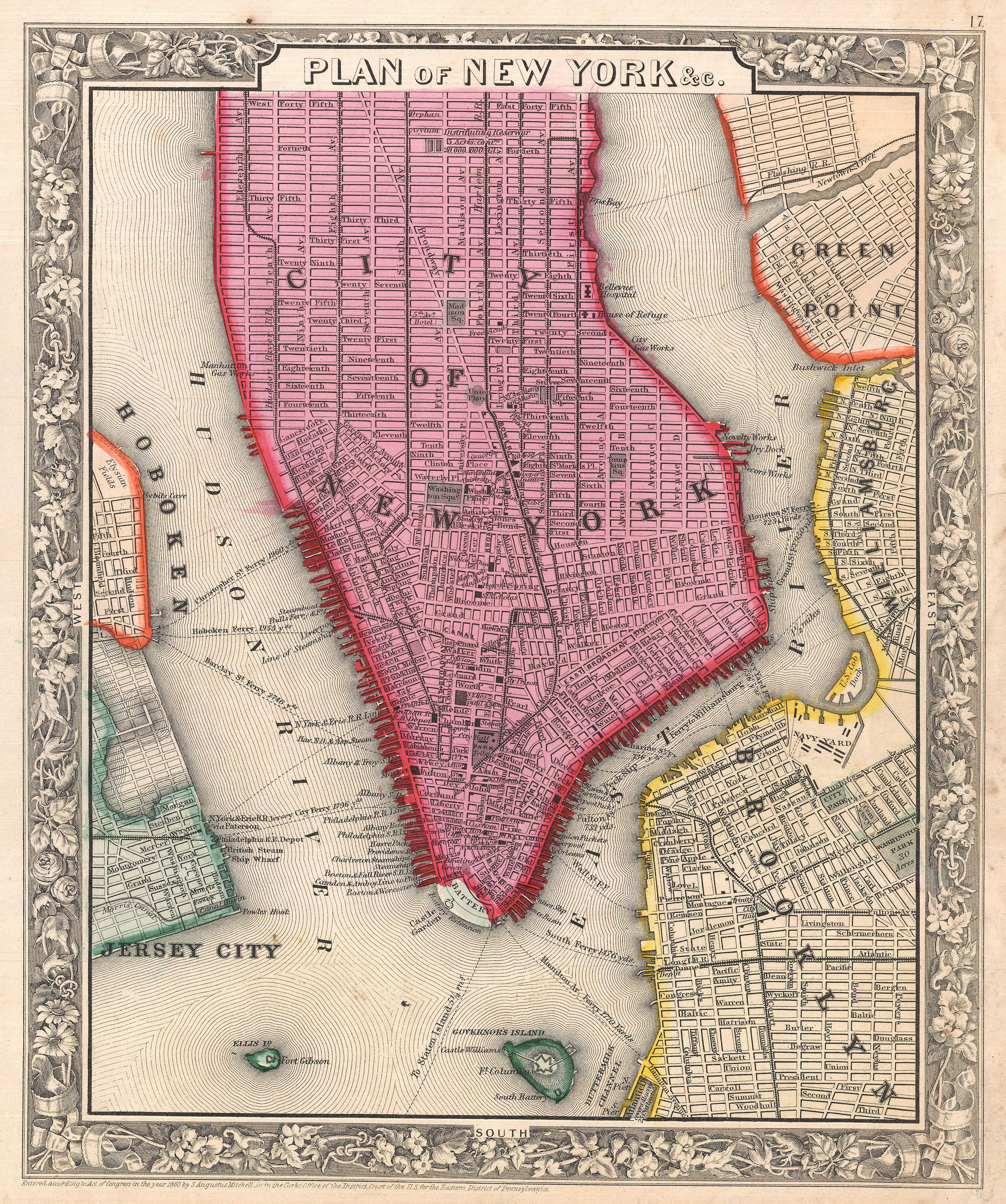
1860 map of New York City

Prior to the Civil War, in 1861, Mayor Wood proposed that New York City secede from the United States as a neutral sovereign city-state called Free City of Tri-Insula as a way to avoid the ravages of war. Despite strong local Copperhead sympathies, the proposal was not well received.

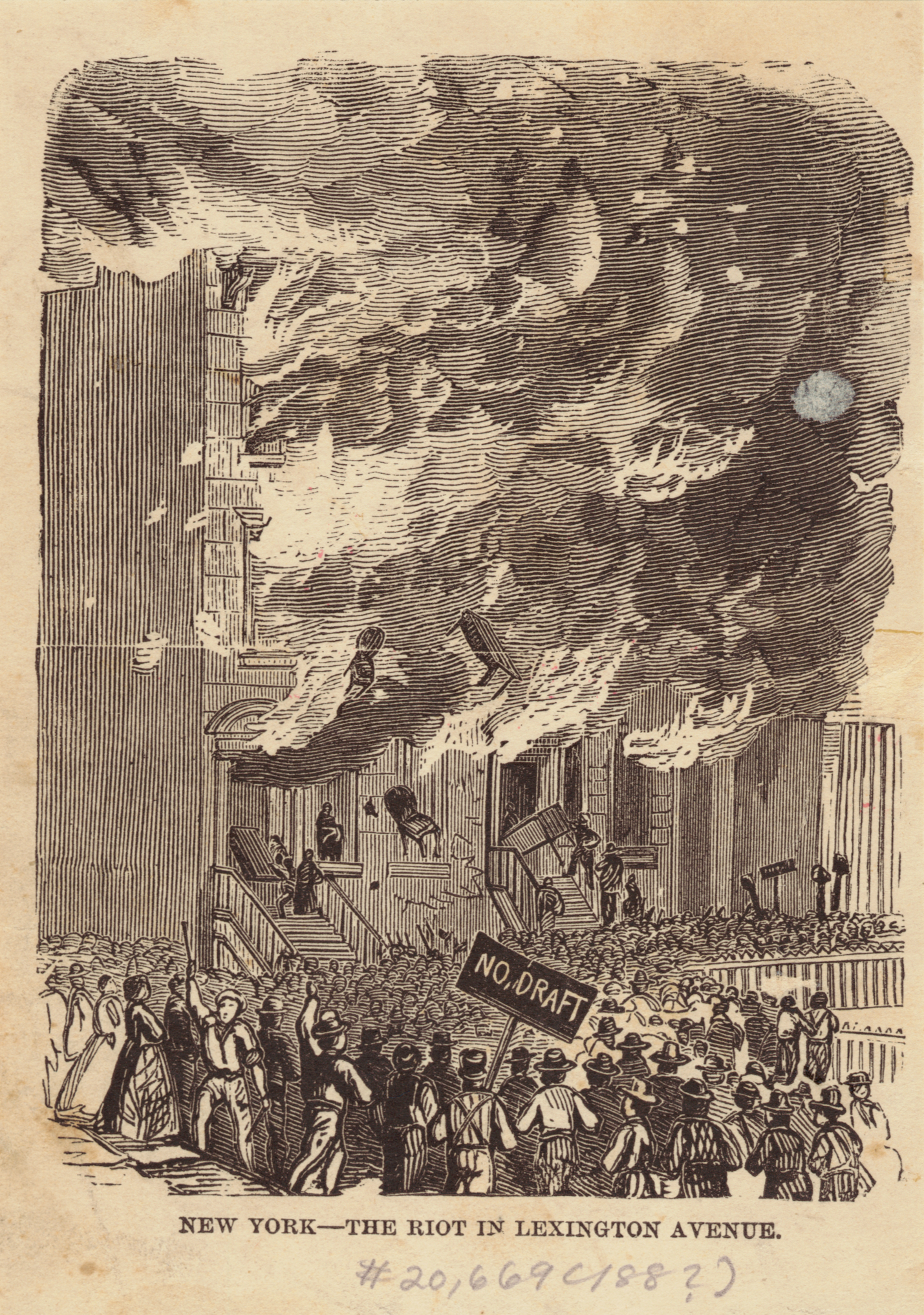
The New York City Draft Riots in 1863

The city provided a major source of troops, supplies, equipment, and financing for the Union Army. Powerful New York politicians and newspaper editors helped shape public opinion toward the war effort and the policies of President Abraham Lincoln. The port of New York, a major entry point for immigrants, served as recruiting grounds for the Army. In July 1863, Irish Catholic protestors of conscription began five days of rioting. The "Draft Riots", the worst in American history, targeted blacks and wealthy Republicans. It was suppressed by artillery units of the United States Army firing grapeshot that killed and wounded hundreds of rioters. Months later, the upscale membership of the New York Union League Club recruited over 2,000 black men for the 20th United States Colored Infantry to help fill the quotas and to make a major contribution to African American civil rights. The neighboring city of Brooklyn was more consistently pro-war.

In 1865 the Metropolitan Fire District united the fire departments of New York and Brooklyn, and was more successful than the earlier Metropolitan Police District, eventually developing into the New York City Fire Department.

== Tourism and entertainment ==
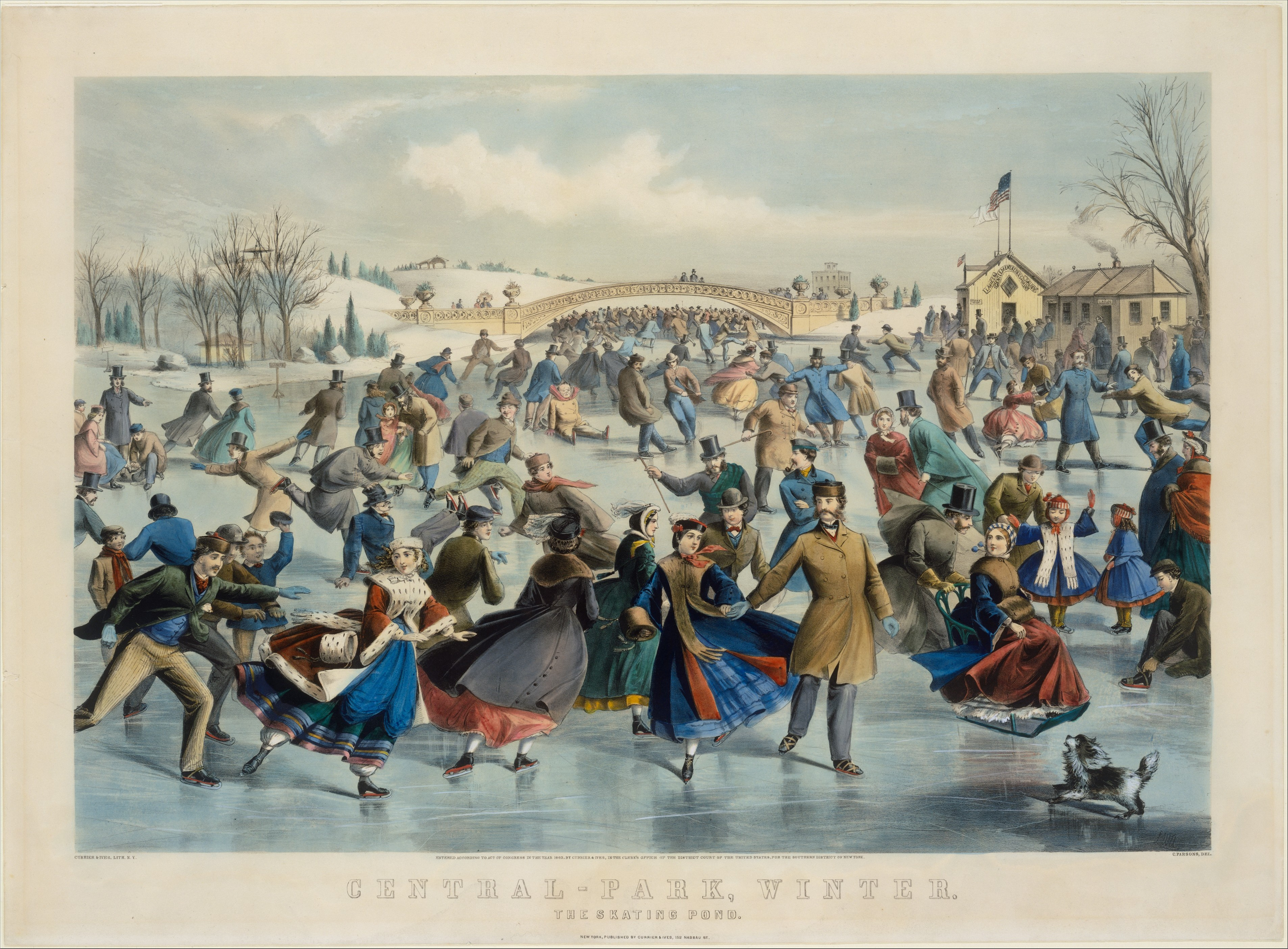
Ice skating in Central Park, 1862 lithograph by Currier and Ives

New York increasingly became the national capital for the rapidly expanding tourism and entertainment industries. Steamships and railways brought not just immigrants and businessmen but tourists, and grand hotels were built for upscale visitors. New York's theater district gradually moved northward during this half century, from the Bowery up Broadway through Union Square and Madison Square, settling around Times Square at the end of the 19th century. Edwin Booth and Lillian Russell were among the Broadway stars. Prostitutes served a wide variety of clientele, from sailors on leave to playboys.

The first nightclubs appeared in New York City in the 1840s and 1850s, including McGlory's, and the Haymarket. They enjoyed a national reputation for live music, dance, and vaudeville acts. They tolerated unlicensed liquor, commercial sex, and gambling cards, chiefly Faro. Practically all gambling was illegal in the city (except upscale horseracing tracks), and regular payoffs to political and police leadership was necessary. Prices were high and they were patronized by an upscale audience. Timothy Gilfoyle calls him "the first nightclubs." By contrast, Owney Geoghegan ran the toughest nightclub in New York, 1880–83. It catered to a downscale clientele and besides the usual illegal liquor, gambling and prostitution, it featured nighly fistfights, and occasional shootings, stabbings, and police raids. Webster Hall is credited as the first modern nightclub. It opened in 1886 as a "social hall", originally functioning as a home for dance and political activism events.

== Gilded Age ==
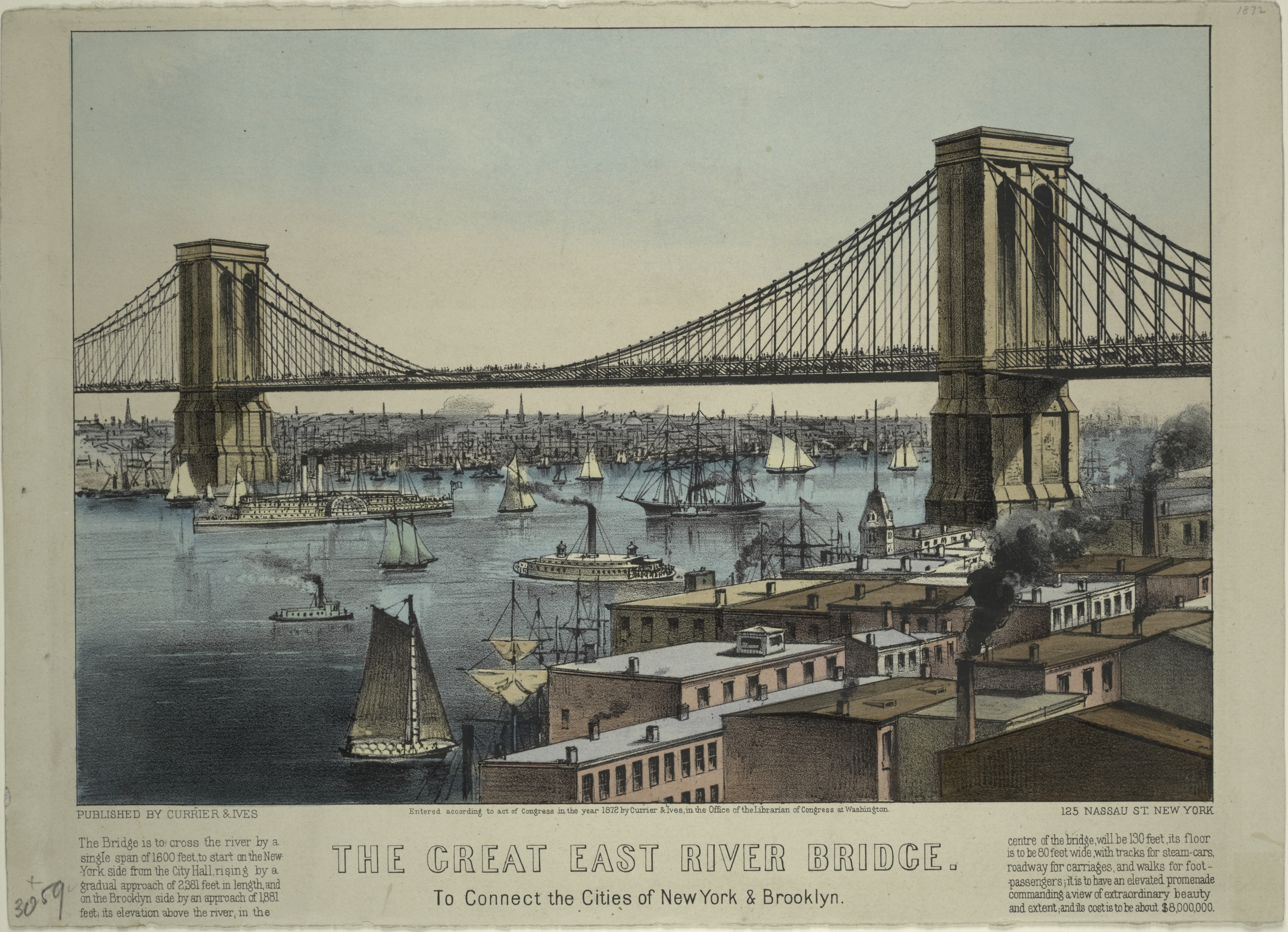
The Great East River Bridge To connect the cities of New York and Brooklyn, Currier & Ives, 1872

The Taylor Map of New York, 1879

The post-war period was noted for the corruption and graft for which Tammany Hall has become proverbial, but equally for the foundation of New York's pre-eminent cultural institutions, the Metropolitan Museum of Art and the Metropolitan Opera. The Brooklyn Museum was a major institution of New York's independent sister city. Various older institutions merged into the New York Public Library. The New York Academy of Sciences, founded early in the century, expanded and promoted other institutions such as the New York Botanical Garden and the American Museum of Natural History.

New York newspapers were read across the nation, particularly, the New York Tribune, edited by Horace Greeley, the voice of the new Republican Party.

As immigration increased in cities, poverty rose as well. The poorest crowded into low-cost housing such as the Five Points and Hell's Kitchen neighborhoods in Manhattan. These areas were quickly overridden with notorious criminal gangs such as the Five Points Gang and the Bowery Boys. Overcrowding spread germs; the death rates in big city tenements vastly exceeded those in the countryside.

Rapid outward expansion required longer journeys to work and shopping for the middle class office workers and housewives. The working class generally did not own automobiles until after 1945; they typically walked to nearby factories and patronized small neighborhood stores. The middle class demanded a better transportation system. Slow horse-drawn streetcars and faster electric trolleys were the rage in the 1880s.

In the horse-drawn era, streets were unpaved and covered with dirt or gravel. However, this produced uneven wear, opened new hazards for pedestrians, and made for dangerous potholes for bicycles and for motor vehicles. Manhattan alone had 130,000 horses in 1900, pulling streetcars, delivery wagons, and private carriages, and leaving their waste behind. They were not fast, and pedestrians could dodge and scramble their way across the crowded streets. Traffic injuries and deaths were mostly caused by horses escaping control.

In small towns, people mostly walked to their destination, so they continued to rely on dirt and gravel road surfaces into the 1920s. Larger cities had much more complex transportation needs. They wanted better streets, so they paved them with wood or granite blocks.

By the end of the century, American cities boasted 30 million square yards of asphalt paving, followed by brick construction. Street-level electric trolleys moved at 12 miles per hour, and became the main transportation service for middle class shoppers and office workers. Big-city streets became paths for faster and larger and more dangerous vehicles, the pedestrians beware. In the largest cities, street railways were elevated, which increased their speed and lessened their dangers. Boston built the first subway in the 1890s followed by New York a decade later.

== Immigration ==
The flood of immigration from Europe passed first through Castle Clinton (opened 1855) and then through Ellis Island (opened 1892) in New York Harbor, with the nearby Statue of Liberty (formally Liberty Enlightening the World) opening in 1886. Most of the new arrivals headed to destinations across the north and west, but many made New York City their destination.

European immigration brought further social upheaval, and old world criminal societies rapidly exploited the already corrupt municipal machine politics of Tammany Hall. Housing, especially in the southern tip of Manhattan, became crowded with newly built tenements and flimsy shacks in the back. Italians settled around Mulberry Street between the East Village and Lower Manhattan, in an area later to be known as "Little Italy." Many Yiddish-speaking East European Jews came to the Lower East Side.

In the Orange Riots of July 1871 and 1872, Catholic Irish attempted to stop Protestant Irish from celebrating the anniversary of the Battle of the Boyne. These resulted in more than 33 deaths and many wounded. Pioneering photojournalist Jacob Riis documented the poor conditions of immigrant tenement dwellers in his 1890 How the Other Half Lives; he was befriended by Republican reformer Theodore Roosevelt. Roosevelt lost his mayoral race in 1886. Reformers did win in 1894, and Roosevelt undertook a major reform of the New York City Police Department in 1895–97 during his term as President of the Police Commissioners.

=== Public health ===
Epidemics (typhus, cholera, diphtheria, and tuberculosis) were rampant in the city's slums. Horse manure covered the streets. In winter, when all the grime froze, walking on the sidewalks was a challenge. Dead pigs and other carcasses remained on the street for weeks. In 1894, Colonel George E. Waring Jr. introduced sanitary reforms using a large street cleaning force.

== Politics ==
=== Tammany Hall ===
William Tweed, better known as Boss Tweed, had become the sole leader of Tammany Hall by 1867. From April 1870, with the passage of a city charter consolidating power in the hands of his political allies, Tweed and his cronies were able to defraud the city of some tens of millions of dollars over the next two years and eight months, most famously with the construction bill for a lavish courthouse. The efforts of reform-oriented Democratic politicians, especially Samuel J. Tilden, as well as aggressive newspaper editors aided by the biting cartoons of Thomas Nast, helped elect opposition candidates in 1871. Tweed was convicted of forgery and larceny in 1873. Tweed's fall put an end to the immunity of corrupt local political leaders and was a precursor to Progressive Era reforms in the city.

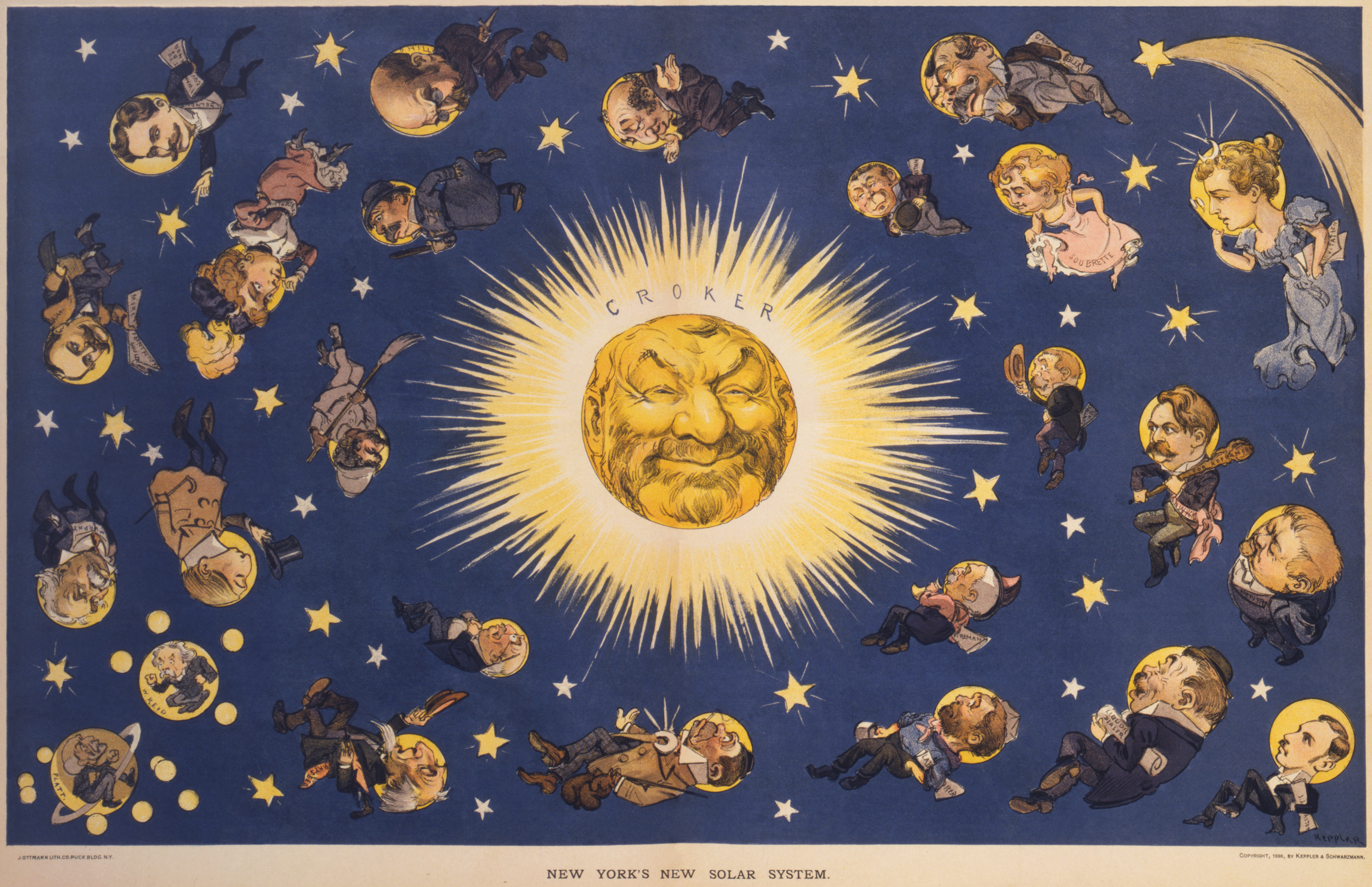
In this 1899 Udo Keppler cartoon from Puck, all of New York City politics revolves around boss Richard Croker.

Tammany did not take long to rebound from Tweed's fall. Reforms demanded a general housecleaning, and former county sheriff "Honest John" Kelly was selected as the new leader. Kelly was not implicated in the Tweed scandals and was a religious Catholic related by marriage to Archbishop John McCloskey. He cleared Tammany of Tweed's people and tightened the Grand Sachem's control over the hierarchy. His success at revitalizing the machine was such that in the election of 1874, the Tammany candidate, William H. Wickham, unseated the unpopular reformist incumbent, William F. Havemeyer, and Democrats generally won their races, delivering control of the city back to Tammany Hall.

Theodore Roosevelt, before he became president in 1901, was deeply involved in New York City politics. He explains how the machine worked:

The organization of a party in our city is really much like that of an army. There is one great central boss, assisted by some trusted and able lieutenants; these communicate with the different district bosses, whom they alternately bully and assist. The district boss in turn has a number of half-subordinates, half-allies, under him; these latter choose the captains of the election districts, etc., and come into contact with the common healers.

=== Reformers ===
Middle-class moral sensibilities were deeply opposed to prostitution and all forms of gambling. The reform movement was strongest in the 1890s. Reform was led by men such as the Reverend Charles H. Parkhurst, the leading Presbyterian pastor and president of the New York Society for the Prevention of Crime; reform mayor William L. Strong, and his police commissioner Theodore Roosevelt. Reformers passed laws in the state legislature against any emerging gambling venue. Such laws were enforced in most small towns and rural areas, but not in New York's larger cities, where political machines controlled the police and the courts.

== Economy ==
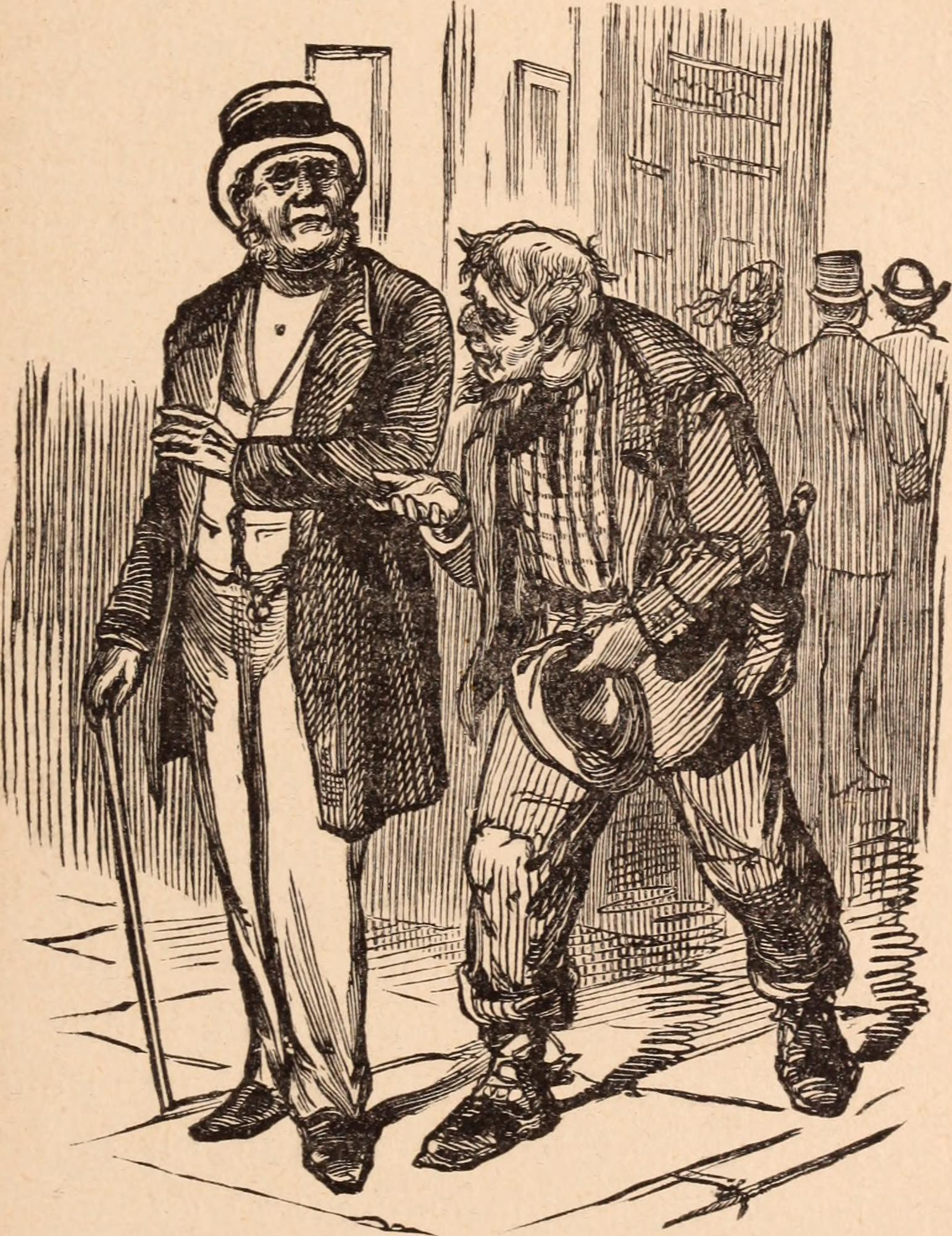
Street beggar, 1888

In 1874, nearly 61% of all U.S. exports passed through New York Harbor. In 1884, nearly 70% of U.S. imports came through New York. The eventual rise of ports on the Gulf of Mexico and on the Pacific coast reduced New York's share of imports and exports to about 47% in 1910. The city's banking resources grew 250% between 1888 and 1908, compared to the national increase of 26%. Between 1860 and 1907, the assessed value of the land and buildings on Manhattan rose from $1.7 billion to $6.7 billion.

The city and its suburbs, mainly Brooklyn and Long Island City, also became important in light industry. Its factories dominated the garment industry and some high technology industries of the Second Industrial Revolution such as sewing machines and pianos. It was an important center for other hi-tech items such as hard rubber products and electrical goods. Petroleum and chemical works sprang up along Newtown Creek, Bayonne, New Jersey, and other industrial suburbs.

=== Department stores ===
In modern major cities, the department store made a dramatic appearance in the middle of the 19th century and permanently reshaped shopping habits and the definition of service and luxury. Similar developments were underway in Paris and London. New York became a regional and national destination for upscale shoppers, thanks to its development of the modern department store. London and Paris were developing department stores around the same time, and the leaders quickly adopted innovations. In 1846, Alexander Turney Stewart established his "Marble Palace" on Broadway, between Chambers and Reade Streets. He offered upscale retail merchandise at fixed prices. Though it was clad in white marble to look like a Renaissance palazzo, the building's cast iron construction had large plate glass windows that permitted major seasonal displays, especially in the Christmas shopping season. Increasingly, the clientele were women from wealthy or upper-middle-class families.

In 1862, Stewart built a new store on a full city block with eight floors and nineteen departments of dress goods and furnishing materials, carpets, glass and china, toys and sports equipment, ranged around a central glass-covered court. His innovations included buying from manufacturers for cash and in large quantities, keeping his markup small and prices low, truthful presentation of merchandise, the one-price policy (so there was no haggling), simple merchandise returns and cash refund policy, selling for cash and not credit, buyers who searched worldwide for quality merchandise, departmentalization, vertical and horizontal integration, volume sales, and free services for customers such as waiting rooms and free delivery of purchases. His innovations were quickly copied by other department stores.

In 1858, Rowland Hussey Macy founded Macy's as a dry goods store. Benjamin Altman and Lord & Taylor soon competed with Stewart as New York's earliest department stores.

By the 1880s New York's retail center had moved uptown, forming a stretch of retail shopping from "Marble Palace" that was called the "Ladies' Mile". By 1894 the major stores competed in the Christmas season with elaborate Christmas window displays; in 1895 Macy's featured 13 tableaux, including scenes from Jack and the Beanstalk, Gulliver's Travels and other children's favorites.

The department store was especially important for women; in middle-class families women took control of the purchasing, and the department stores catered to their tastes. Furthermore, ambitious young women from the middle class who wanted a career were welcomed into the clerical ranks, where they developed social skills to work with their upscale customers.

== Skyscrapers and apartment buildings ==
New inventions facilitated the emergence of the skyscraper in the 1880s—it was a characteristic American style that was not widely copied around the world until the late 20th century. Construction required several major innovations, including the elevator and structural steel. The steel skeleton, developed in the 1880s, replaced the heavy brick walls that were limited to 15 or so stories in height. The skyscraper also required a complex internal structure to solve issues of ventilation, steam heat, gas lighting (and later electricity), and plumbing.

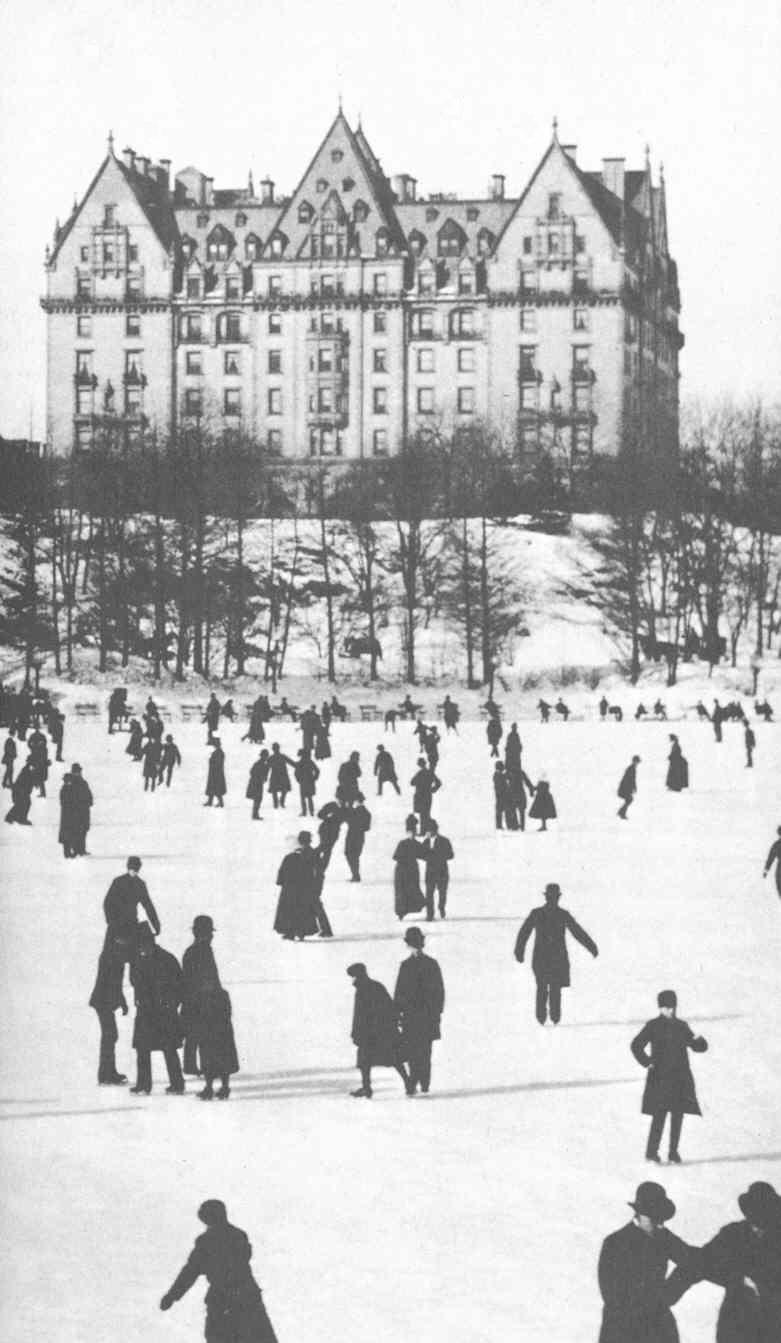
The Dakota luxury apartment building, view from Central Park, 1890

The city's housing involved a wide variety of styles, but most of the attention focused on the tenement house for the working class and the apartment building for the middle class. The apartment building came first, as middle-class professionals, businessmen, and white-collar workers realized they did not need and could scarcely afford single-family dwellings in the high-cost real estate districts of the city. Boarding houses were inappropriate for family; hotel suites were too expensive. In outlying neighborhoods there were many apartments over stores and shops, usually occupied by proprietors of small local businesses. Apartment dwellers paid rent and did not own their apartments until the emergence of cooperatives in the 20th century. Turnover was very high, and there was seldom a sense of neighborhood community.

Starting with the luxurious Stuyvesant Apartments that opened in 1869, and the even more lavish The Dakota in 1884, affluent tenants hired full-time staff to handle the upkeep and maintenance, as well as security.

The less-lavish middle-class apartment buildings provided gas lighting, elevators, good plumbing, central heating, and maintenance men on call. Apartment buildings were built along the paths of the street railways since the middle-class tenants rode the streetcar to work, while the working class saved a nickel each way and walked.

The working class crowded into tenement houses, with far fewer features and amenities. Novelist Stephen Crane in Maggie: A Girl of the Streets (1893) wrote of an Irish tenement neighborhood characterized by poverty and violence:

"Eventually they entered into a dark region where, from a careening building, a dozen gruesome doorways gave up loads of babies to the street and the gutter. A wind of early autumn raised yellow dust from cobble and swirled it against an hundred windows. Long streamers of garments fluttered from fire escapes. In all unhandy places there were buckets, brooms, rags, and bottles. In the street infants played or fought with other infants or sat stupidly in the way of vehicles. Formidable women, with uncombed hair and disordered dress, gossiped while leaning on railings, or screamed in frantic quarrels. Withered persons, in curious postures of submission to something, sat smoking pipes in obscure corners. A thousand odors of cooking food came forth to the street. The building quivered and creaked from the weight of humanity stamping about in its bowels."

Tenements were cheap and easy to build, and filled up almost the entire lot. There were typically five story walk-ups, with four separate apartments on each floor. There was minimal air circulation and sunlight. Until the Tenement House Act of 1879, newly built tenements lacked running water or indoor toilets. A law in 1901 required indoor plumbing be retrofitted to older tenements. Garbage pickup was erratic until late in the 19th century. Rent was cheap for those who could endure the dust, clutter, smells and noises; the only cheaper alternatives were squalid basement rooms in older buildings. Most of the tenements survived until the urban renewal movement of the 1950s.

== Neighborhoods ==
Pre-war steam ferries had already made Brooklyn Heights into a bedroom community for affluent professionals on Wall Street and other urban areas. Elevated railroads, operated by the Manhattan Railway Company, and other new public transport expanded the commuter area of New York, allowing development of suburbs for commuters of more modest means in Upper West Side and other distant areas. Plans were made for subways to still more remote exurbs such as Harlem and the West Bronx.

In the late 19th century, the island's schist bedrock encouraged the early skyscrapers whose successors characterize its skyline today. The Great Blizzard of 1888 exposed the vulnerability of the urban infrastructure connecting those buildings, encouraging the undergrounding of electric and telephone lines, and plans were made for a subway line.

== Consolidation ==
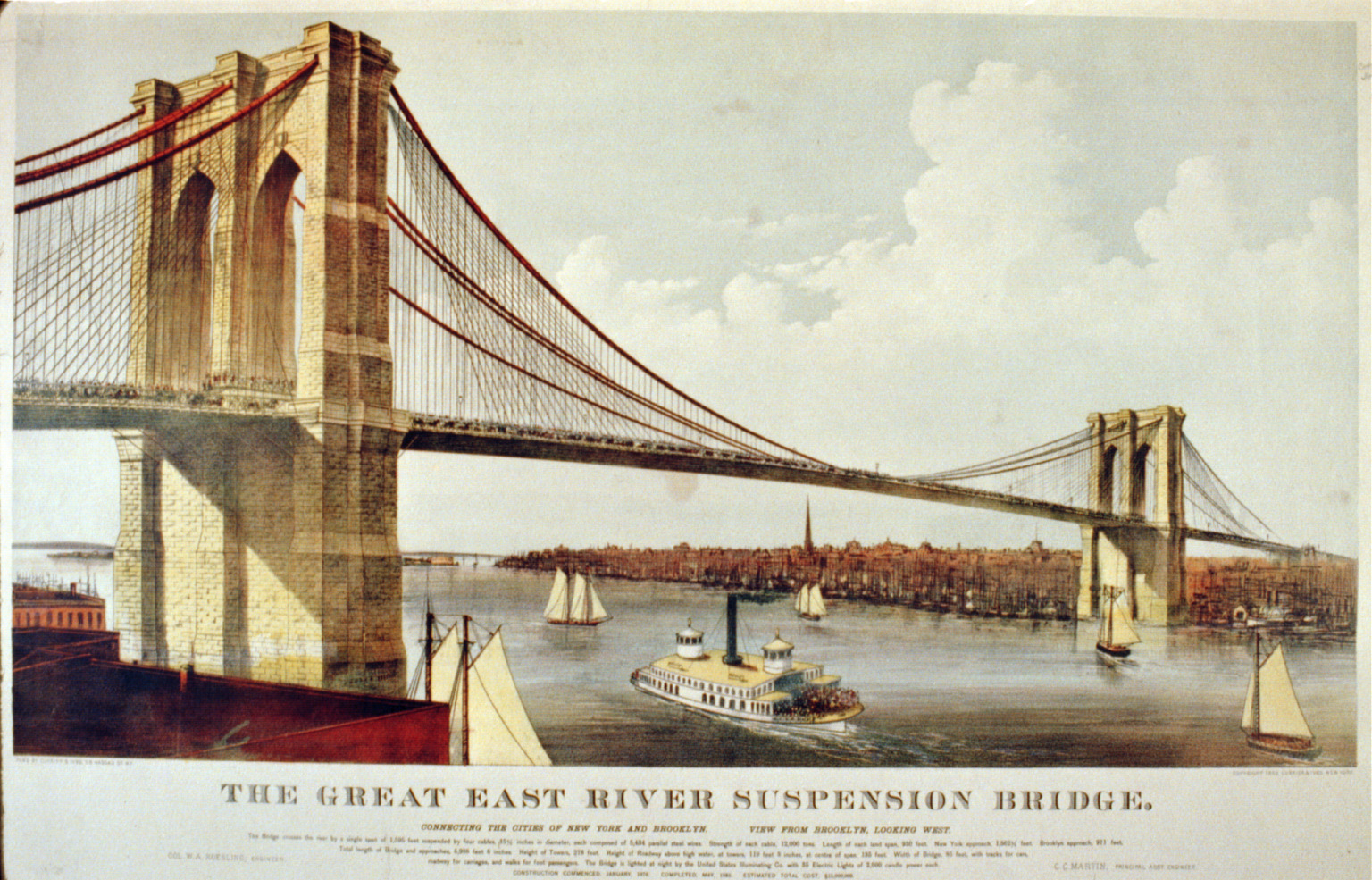
This 1877 Currier & Ives print of an unfinished Brooklyn Bridge showed a vision of greater urban integration.

In 1855, the City of Brooklyn annexed Williamsburg and Bushwick, forming the third most-populous city in America. In 1870, Long Island City was formed in Queens. In 1874, New York City annexed the West Bronx, west of the Bronx River. The Brooklyn Bridge, completed in 1883, epitomized the heroic confidence of a generation and drew the two cities of Brooklyn and New York inexorably together. As Brooklyn annexed the remainder of Kings County in the decade from 1886 to 1896, the issue of consolidation grew more pressing.

The modern city of Greater New York — the five boroughs — was created in 1898, with the consolidation of the cities of New York (then Manhattan and the Bronx) and Brooklyn with the largely rural areas of Queens and Staten Island.

== See also ==
- Timeline of New York City, 1850s-1890s
- New York City Police Riot of 1857
- 1886 New York City mayoral election
- History of New York City

| Preceded by History of New York City (1784–1854) | History of New York City (1855–1897) | Succeeded by History of New York City (1898–1945) |
