= Dead Rabbits =

Irish American criminal street gang in Lower Manhattan in the 1850s

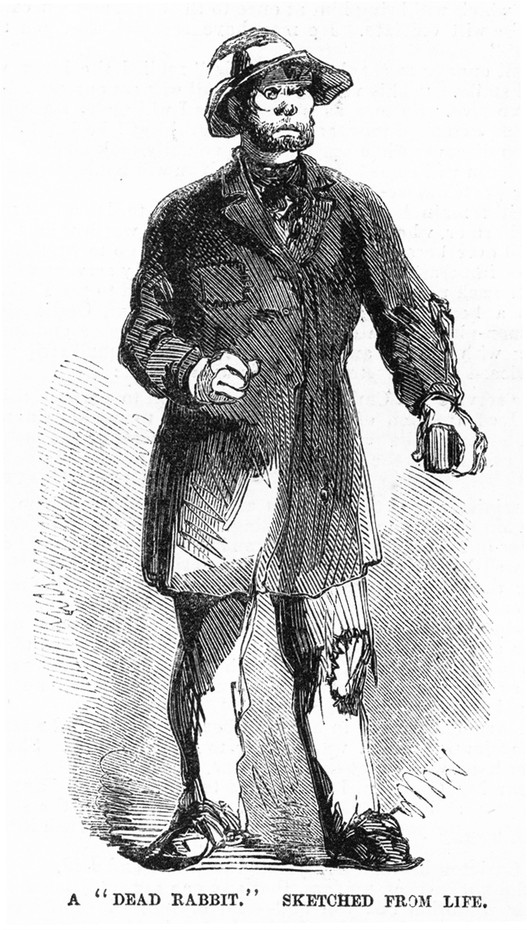
- Dead Rabbit holding a brickbat as a weapon in July 1857
- Founding location: Five Points, Manhattan, New York (present-day Worth Street, Baxter Street, and Columbus Park), Manhattan, New York City
- Years active: 1830s-1860s
- Territory: Five Points, Manhattan
- Ethnicity: Irish and Irish-American
- Criminal activities: Street fighting, knife fighting, assault, murder, robbery, arson, rioting
- Allies: Chichesters, Tammany Hall, Plug Uglies, Roach Guards, Mulberry Street Boys, Municipal Police, Forty Thieves, Shirt Tails, Kerryonians
- Rivals: Bowery Boys, Atlantic Guards, O'Connell Guards, American Guards, True Blue Americans, Empire Guards, New York City Police Department

The Dead Rabbits were an Irish American criminal street gang active in Lower Manhattan in the 1830s to 1850s. The Dead Rabbits were so named after a dead rabbit was thrown into the center of the room during a gang meeting, prompting some members to treat this as an omen, withdraw, and form an independent gang. Their battle symbol was a dead rabbit on a pike. They often clashed with nativist political groups who viewed Irish Catholics as a threatening and criminal subculture. The Dead Rabbits were given the nicknames of "Mulberry Boys" and the "Mulberry Street Boys" by the New York City Police Department because they were known to have operated along Mulberry Street in the Five Points.

Tyler Anbinder, an American historian, claims that the Dead Rabbits did not exist as a gang and were actually misidentified members of the Roach Guards.

== History ==
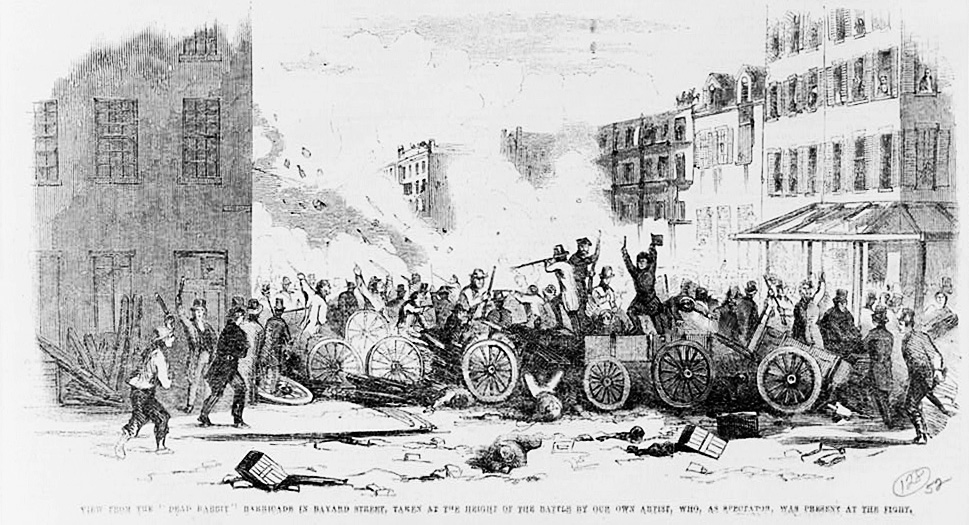
A view of the fight between the two gangs, the "Dead Rabbits" and the "Bowery Boys" in the Bowery during the Dead Rabbits Riot of 1857.

The original Dead Rabbits were founded by disgruntled gang members of the Roach Guards, who became the largest Irish crime organization in early 19th-century Manhattan, having well over 100 members when called up for action. Their chief rival gang was the Bowery Boys, native-born New Yorkers who supported the Know Nothing anti-immigrant political party, who also, through Michael Walsh, had links to the dominant Protestant minority in Ireland and immigrants of that background; Herbert Asbury's seemingly contradictory observation in his 1927 book Gangs of New York: An Informal History of the Underworld that the Bowery Boys were an Irish gang, despite being anti-Catholic is explained by the deep-seated divisions in religion, culture and economic circumstances between the two groups on the island of Ireland which were carried over to the new world.

These two rival gangs fought more than 200 gang battles in a span of 10 years, beginning in 1834, and they often outmanned the police force and even the state militias. Besides street-fighting, the Dead Rabbits supported politicians such as Fernando Wood and the Tammany Hall machine, whose platforms included the welfare and benefit of immigrant groups and minorities, and under the leadership of Isaiah Rynders the gang acted as enforcers to violently persuade voters during elections to vote for their candidates. According to legend, one of the most feared Dead Rabbits was "Hell-Cat Maggie", a woman who reportedly filed her teeth to points and wore brass fingernails into battle.

On July 4, 1857, a prolonged riot occurred between the Dead Rabbits and the Metropolitan Police, and the Bowery gangs against the Municipal Police, Mulberry Street Boys, Roach Guards, and Dead Rabbits in Bayard Street. Their members may also have participated in the 1863 New York Draft Riots in the American Civil War, and in the Orange Riots of 1870 and 1871, which all broke out around the time of (July) The Twelfth, the date of the main annual Irish Protestant commemoration which heightened tensions between the two Irish communities in the United States (and continues to do so in Northern Ireland today).

By 1866, mentions of the Dead Rabbits as an organization currently in existence disappeared from New York City newspapers, and they were sometimes referred to in the past tense. The term "Dead Rabbit" was used as the 1870s as a generic term for a riotous people or groups.

=== Historical accuracy of name ===
American historian Tyler Anbinder claims that there is no evidence of a Dead Rabbits gang existing, and that the alleged organization was a misnomer for the Roach Guards. In Anbinder's telling of events, in the aftermath of a gang war between the Bowery Boys and the Roach Guards, reporters relied heavily on the Bowery Boys for information. The Bowery Boys likely tarred the Roach Guards with the slang term "dead Rabbit party", referring to thieves, and the press continued using the term despite Five Points locals expressing incredulity at the unfamiliar name. Anbinder writes that "there seems to be no justification for referring to the Bowery Boys' adversaries by [the name Dead Rabbits]."

== Song ==
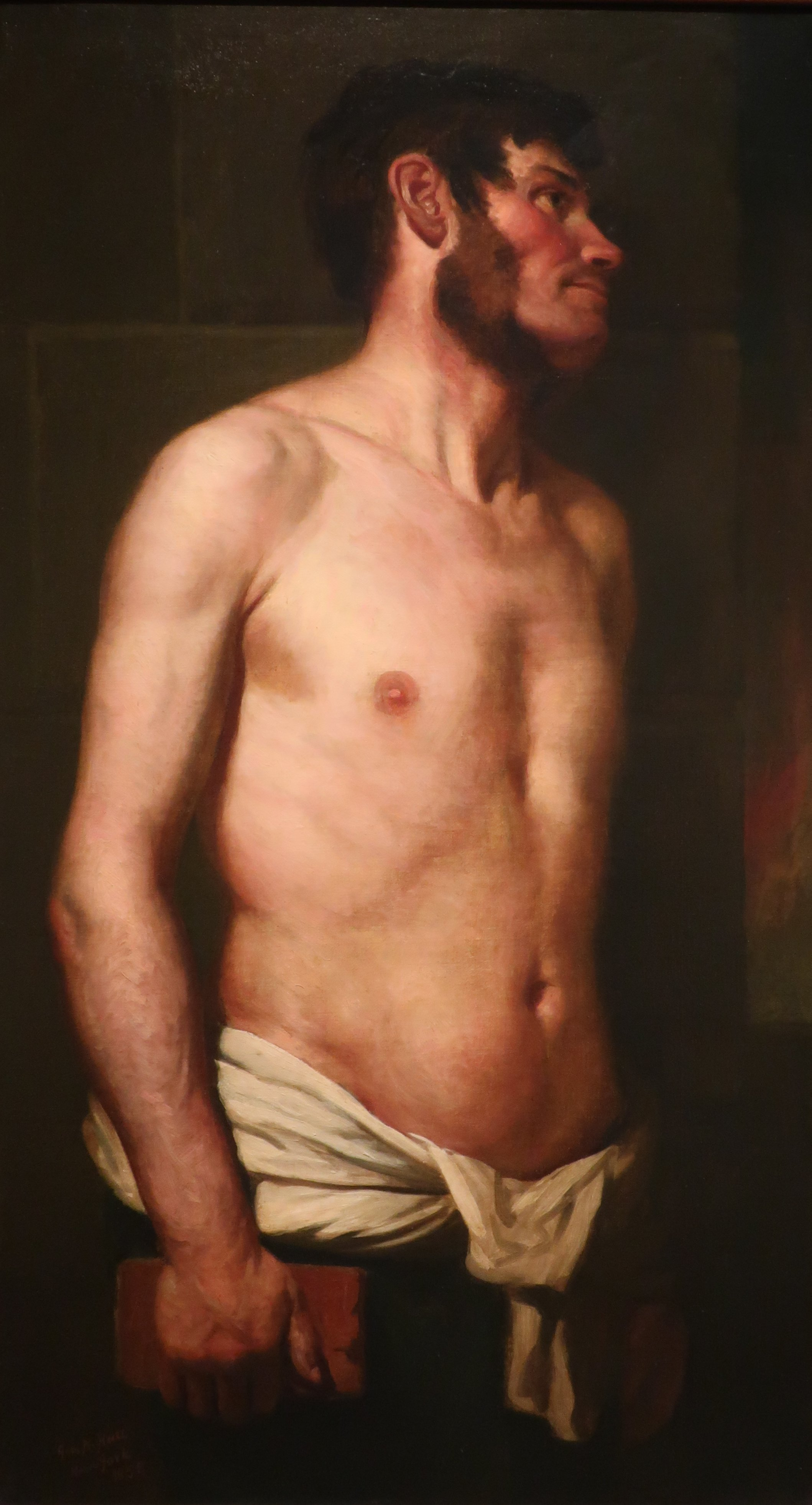
George Henry Hall, artist painting A Dead Rabbit, 1858; also called Study of the Nude or Study of an Irishman.

Lyrics detailing the Dead Rabbits' battle with the Bowery Boys on July 4, 1857, were written by Henry Sherman Backus and Daniel Decatur Emmett:

Chorus
Then pull off the coat and roll up the sleeve,
For Bayard is a hard street to travel;
So pull off the coat and roll up the sleeve,
The Bloody Sixth is a hard ward to travel I believe.

Like wild dogs they did fight, this Fourth of July night,
Of course they laid their plans accordin';
Some were wounded and some killed, and lots of blood spill'd,
In the fight on the other side of Jordan.

Chorus
The new Police did join the Bowery boys in line,
With orders strict and right accordin;
Bullets, clubs and bricks did fly, and many groan and die,
Hard road to travel over Jordan.

Chorus
When the new police did interfere, this made the Rabbits sneer,
And very much enraged them accordin';
With bricks they did go in, determined for to win,
And drive them on the other side of Jordan.

Chorus
Upon the following day they had another fray,
The Black Birds and Dead Rabbits accordin;
The soldiers were call'd out, to quell the mighty riot,
And drove them on the other side of Jordan.

== In popular culture ==
The story of the New York Dead Rabbits is told, in highly fictionalized form, in Martin Scorsese's 2002 film Gangs of New York, which was partially inspired by Herbert Asbury's book Gangs of New York. In the 2014 film, Winter's Tale, the Dead Rabbits and the Short Tails are featured prominently; a similar theme pervades Mark Helprin's 1983 novel of the same name.

A book of poetry by Richard Griffin, The Dead Rabbit Riot, A.D. 1857: And Other Poems, was published in 1915. Some of the exploits of the Dead Rabbits are dramatized in Chapter XVIII of MacKinlay Kantor's Pulitzer Prize-winning novel Andersonville (1955). Artist George Henry Hall's 1858 painting is titled A Dead Rabbit (also entitled Study of the Nude or Study of an Irishman), which depicts a dead Dead Rabbit gang member killed during the riot on July 4, 1857, on Manhattan's Lower East Side.. Dead Rabbits are briefly mentioned in Jorge Luis Borges' short story "El proveedor de iniquidades Monk Eastman" ("Monk Eastman, Purveyor of Iniquities"), included in the Borges collection Historia universal de la infamia ("An Universal History of Infamy").

The Dead Rabbit gang served as the inspiration for The Dead Rabbit cocktail bar, which opened in lower Manhattan in 2013. Designed to evoke the drinking habits of 19th-century New Yorkers, the bar has won awards for the best bar in North America and the world.

A Syndicate in the game by Project Moon, Limbus Company, shares the same name, which is very likely a reference.

== See also ==
- Dead Rabbits riot
- Gangs of New York
- Hell-Cat Maggie
- John Morrissey

== Sources ==
- Asbury, Herbert. The Gangs of New York. New York: Alfred A. Knopf, 1928; ISBN 1-56025-275-8
- Sifakis, Carl. The Encyclopedia of American Crime. New York: Facts on File Inc., 2001; ISBN 0-8160-4040-0
