= Shirt Tails =

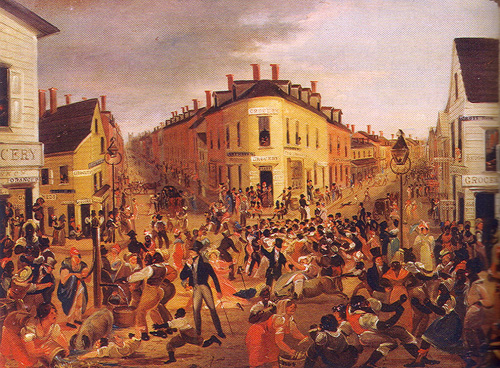
- George Catlin painting of the Five Points, Manhattan, New York City in 1827 the slum territory of the "Shirt Tails" and the other Irish criminal gangs
- Founding location: Five Points, Manhattan, New York City
- Years active: 1830s-1860s
- Territory: Lower East Side, Manhattan, New York City
- Ethnicity: Irish American
- Membership (est.): ?
- Criminal activities: street fighting, knife fighting, assault, murder, robbery
- Allies: Forty Thieves, Roach Guards, Tammany Hall Chichesters, Dead Rabbits,
- Rivals: Bowery Boys, Atlantic Guards

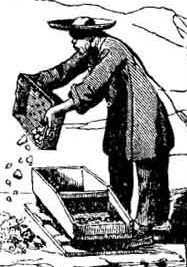
The Shirt Tails wore their shirts on the outside of their pants as 19th-century Chinese laborers would dress as a form of insignia and as a sign of gang group affiliation.

The Shirt Tails were a mid-19th-century street gang based in the Five Points slum in Manhattan, New York, United States, who wore their shirts on the outside of their pants as 19th-century Chinese laborers would dress as a form of insignia and as a sign of gang group affiliation. Members kept their weapons—as many as three or four at a time—concealed beneath their shirts; this discreet measure stands in contrast to competing gangs who flaunted their weapons in order to intimidate.

Never numbering more than a few hundred members, the Shirt Tails, like many other gangs, disappeared shortly before the American Civil War (although they did participate in a coalition of gangs under the Dead Rabbits and fought against the Bowery Boys during the New York Draft Riots), with its remaining members dissipating or joining other Irish gangs.
