= B'hoy and g'hal =

19th century Manhattan slang terms

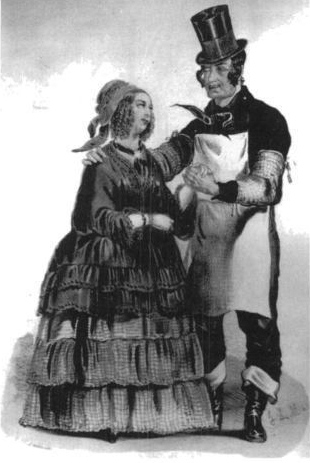
Mary Taylor and Frank Chanfrau as a Bowery g'hal and b'hoy in A Glance at New York.

B'hoy and g'hal (meant to evoke an Irish pronunciation of boy and gal, respectively) were the prevailing slang words used to describe the young men and women of the rough-and-tumble working class culture of Lower Manhattan in the late 1840s and into the period of the American Civil War. They spoke a slang, with phrases such as "hi-hi", "lam him", and "cheese it".

== Etymology ==
The word b'hoy was first used in 1846. In the United States it was a colloquialism for "spirited lad" and "young spark". The word originates from the Irish pronunciation of boy.

== Theatrical examples ==
The prototypical artistic representation of a b'hoy came in 1848, when Frank Chanfrau played the character Mose the Fireboy in Benjamin A. Baker's A Glance at New York. Mose is a pugilistic Irish volunteer fireman. T. Allston Brown gives this description:

He stood there in his red shirt, with his fire coat thrown over his arm, the stovepipe hat — better known as a "plug" — drawn down over one eye, his trousers tucked into his boots, a stump of a cigar pointing up from his lips to his eye, the soap locks plastered flat on his temples, and his jaw protruded into a half-beastly, half-human expression of contemptuous ferocity.

Details varied with each production; some b'hoys were named Sykesy or Syksey, others were butcher's apprentices. Haswell gives a slightly different description of the archetype:

a high beaver hat, with the nap divided and brushed in opposite directions, the hair on the back of his head clipped close, while in front the temple locks were curled and greased (hence, the well-known term of 'soap-locks' to the wearer of them), a smooth face, a gaudy silk neckcloth, black frockcoat, full pantaloons, turned up at the bottom over heavy boots designed for service in slaughter houses and at fires; and when thus equipped, with his girl hanging on his arm, it would have been very injudicious to offer him any obstruction or to utter an offensive remark.

His girlfriend Lize was the prototypical g'hal, dressed in cheap finery and singing songs from her favorite minstrel shows. Mose plays became an enormous hit in New York and other large cities, and theaters were filled with b'hoys and g'hals clamoring to see Chanfrau and other actors perform Bowery b'hoy characters. William Northall even complained that at the Olympic Theatre,

the boxes no longer shone with the elite of the city; the character of the audience was entirely changed, and Mose, instead of appearing on the stage, was in the pit, the boxes, and the gallery. It was all Mose, and the respectability of the house mosed too.

== See also ==
- Bowery Boys (gang)
- Bowery B'hoy
- Mose Humphrey
