= Chichesters =

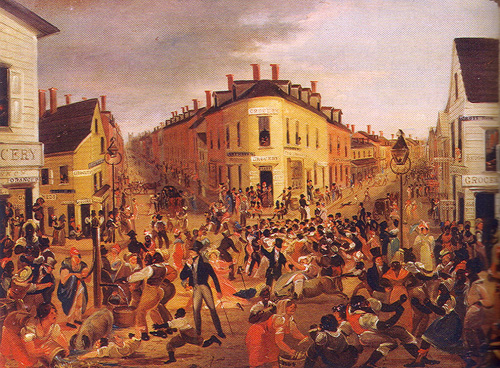
- George Catlin painting of the Five Points, Manhattan, New York City in 1827, the territory of the "Chichesters" and other Irish gangs.
- Founded by: John Chichester
- Founding location: Five Points, Manhattan, New York City
- Years active: 1820s-1860s
- Territory: Five Points, Manhattan, New York City
- Ethnicity: Irish-American
- Membership (est.): 7-?
- Criminal activities: Street fighting, gambling, arson, rioting
- Allies: Dead Rabbits, Tammany Hall
- Rivals: Bowery Boys

The Chichesters also known as the Chichester Gang, along with the Forty Thieves, Shirt Tails, and Kerryonians, were one of the oldest early 19th century Irish Five Points street gangs during the mid 19th century in New York City. The Chichester Gang was organized by its founder John Chichester. The gang got their start by stealing from stores and warehouses and selling the stolen goods to local fences in the 1820s and later became involved in illegal gambling and robbery. An ally of the Dead Rabbits against the Bowery Boys, the Chichesters maintained between 50-100 members lasting for more than 50 years before being absorbed by the Whyos, much like many of the early gangs, following the American Civil War in 1865.
