= Michael Walsh (New York politician) =

American politician and gang member (1810-1859)

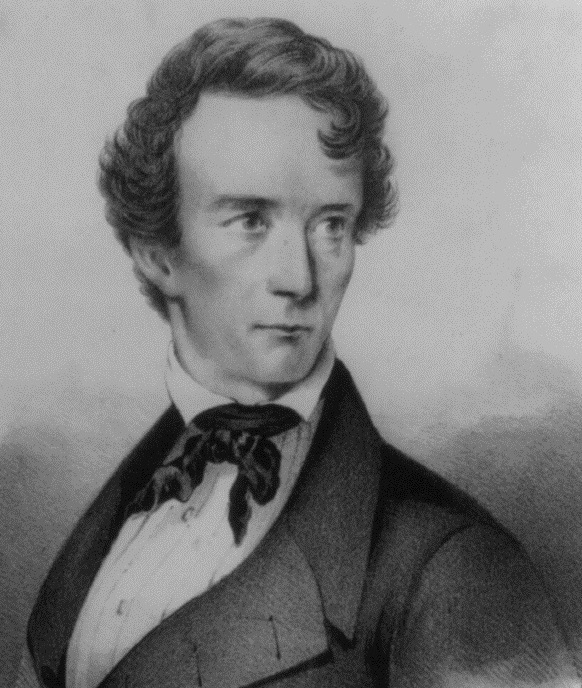
Michael Walsh

Michael Walsh (May 4, 1810 – March 17, 1859) was a United States representative from New York.

== Early life ==
Born in Youghal, County Cork, Ireland to Protestant parents, he completed preparatory studies, was graduated from Trinity College, Dublin and emigrated to the United States, settling in Baltimore, Maryland. He learned the lithographic printing trade, and moved to New York City. While in New York City, Walsh also founded the anti-Catholic Bowery Boys gang.

== Career ==
In 1843 he established the Subterranean, which he stopped after two years when convicted for the publication of libel. Twice sentenced to jail, his second sentence was prorogued when the Bowery Boys threatened violence in the streets. The Subterranean, a Bowery Boys newspaper, declared that "We consider the present infamous persecution of Mike Walsh a blow aimed at the honest laboring portion of this community". In 1843, he created the Spartan Association, a political clubhouse consisting of factory workers and unskilled laborers. Through his connections to Tammany Hall, Walsh was elected to the state legislature, where he earned the support of poet Walt Whitman, and, later, the United States House of Representatives. He was a member of the New York State Assembly (New York Co.) in 1847, 1848 and 1852. He was elected as a Democrat to the 33rd United States Congress, holding office from March 4, 1853, to March 3, 1855. He was an unsuccessful candidate for re-election in 1854, and after his term in Congress was employed as a newspaper reporter. He died in New York City in 1859; interment was in Green-Wood Cemetery, Brooklyn. His obituary, published in The Subterranean and thought to have been written by Whitman, read that the leader of the Bowery Boys was an "original talent, rough, full of passionate impulses...but he lacked balance, caution-the ship often seemed devoid of both ballast and rudder".

== Sources ==
- United States Congress. "Michael Walsh (id: W000102)". Biographical Directory of the United States Congress.
- Ernst, Robert. One and Only Mike Walsh. The New-York Historical Society Quarterly 36 (January 1952): 43–65.

U.S. House of Representatives
Preceded by John Henry Hobart Haws	Member of the U.S. House of Representatives from New York's 4th congressional district 1853–1855	Succeeded by John Kelly
