= Mose Humphrey =

19th century American New York City firefighter and folk hero

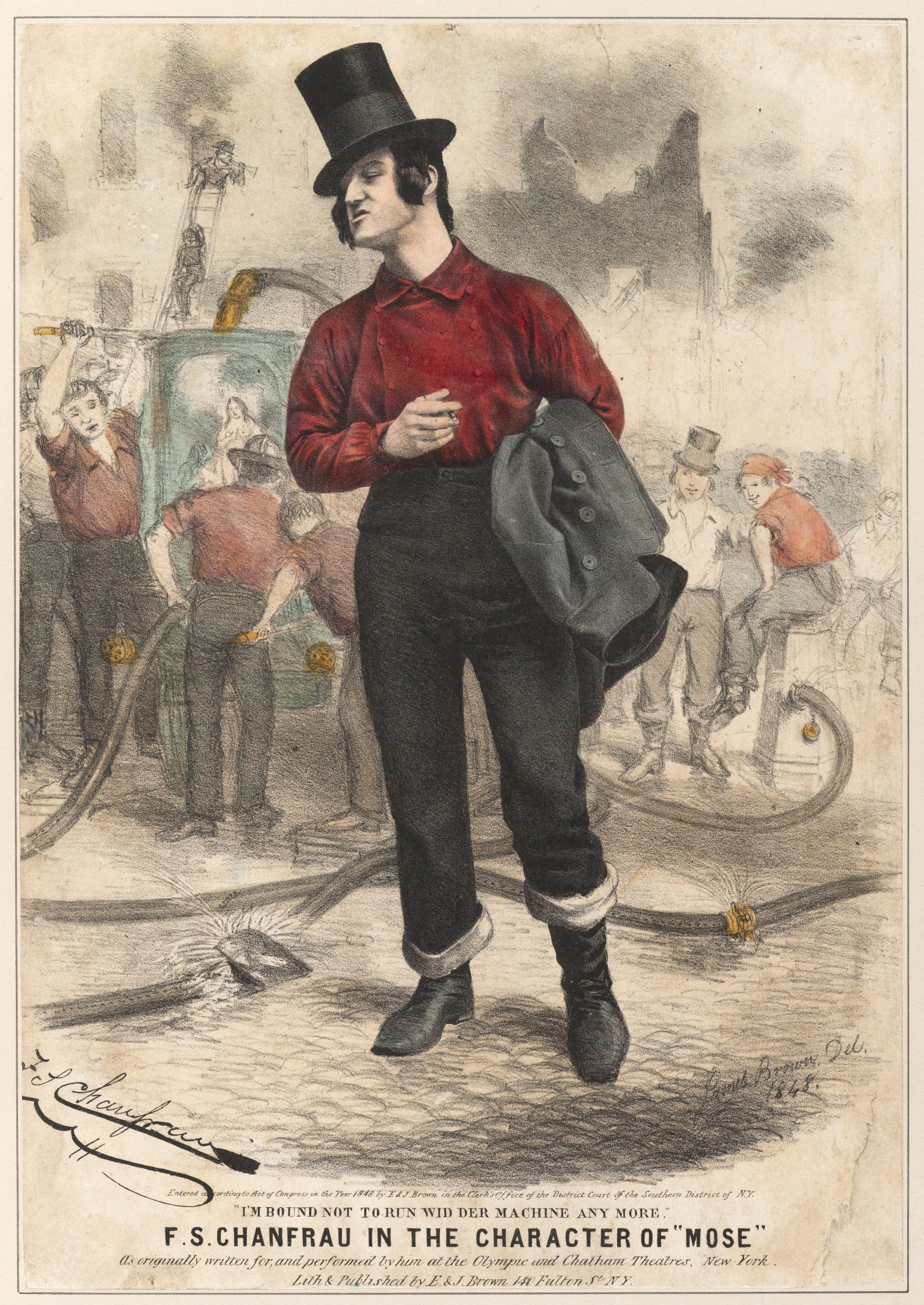
- Frank Chanfrau portraying Mose the Fireboy
- Occupation: Firefighter
- Employer: Fire Company 40, New York City Fire Department
- Known for: Inspiration for the character "Mose the Fireboy"

Mose Humphrey was a member of Fire Company 40 in New York City in the 19th century, and the inspiration for the folk hero character "Mose the Fireboy".

The character of Mose first appeared on Broadway in Benjamin A. Baker's A Glance at New York, in 1848. Mose was featured in several stage shows and penny novels in the mid-19th century. The character was most identified with actor Frank Chanfrau.

The Fireboy character was said to have a height of 8 ft (2.4 m) and hands as big as Virginia hams, able to lift trolley cars over his head and rescue babies inside a stovepipe hat, as his own beaver hat was two foot across the brim. Certain stories recall Mose performing extraordinary deeds, such as swimming the Hudson River with two strokes, or tearing up mulberry and cherry trees to use as a bludgeon against the Plug Uglies, a gang that were at odds with New York Firemen Co. 49.

The real Mose was a parishioner of St. Andrew's Church.
