= Bowery Boys (gang) =

19th century New York City street gang

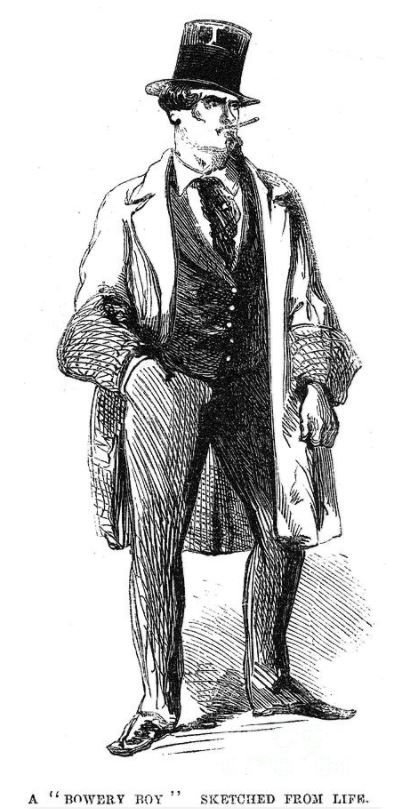
- Bowery Boy of New York City in 1857
- Founded by: Michael Walsh, William "Bill the Butcher" Poole
- Founding location: Bowery, Manhattan, New York City
- Years active: 1830s-1860s
- Territory: The Bowery, Manhattan, New York City
- Ethnicity: Non-Irish, European American
- Membership (est.): ?
- Criminal activities: Street fighting, knife fighting, assault, murder, robbery, arson, rioting
- Allies: American Guards, Atlantic Guards, Empire Guards, O'Connell Guards, True Blue Americans, American Republican Party (American Nativist Party, American Party), Order of the Star Spangled Banner
- Rivals: Dead Rabbits, Plug Uglies, Roach Guards, Shirt Tails, Chichesters, Tammany Hall

The Bowery Boys (vernacular Bowery B'hoys) were a nativist, anti-Catholic, and anti-Irish criminal gang based in the Bowery neighborhood of Manhattan in New York City, United States, in the early-mid-19th century. In contrast with the Irish immigrant tenement of the Five Points, the Bowery was a more prosperous working-class community. The gang was made up exclusively of volunteer firemen—though some also worked as tradesmen, mechanics, and butchers (the primary trade of prominent leader William "Bill the Butcher" Poole)—and would fight rival fire companies over who would extinguish a fire. The Bowery Boys often battled multiple outfits of the infamous Five Points, most notably the Dead Rabbits, with whom they feuded for decades. The uniform of a Bowery Boy generally consisted of a stovepipe hat in variable condition, a red shirt, and dark trousers tucked into boots—this style paying homage to their fireman roots.

== History ==
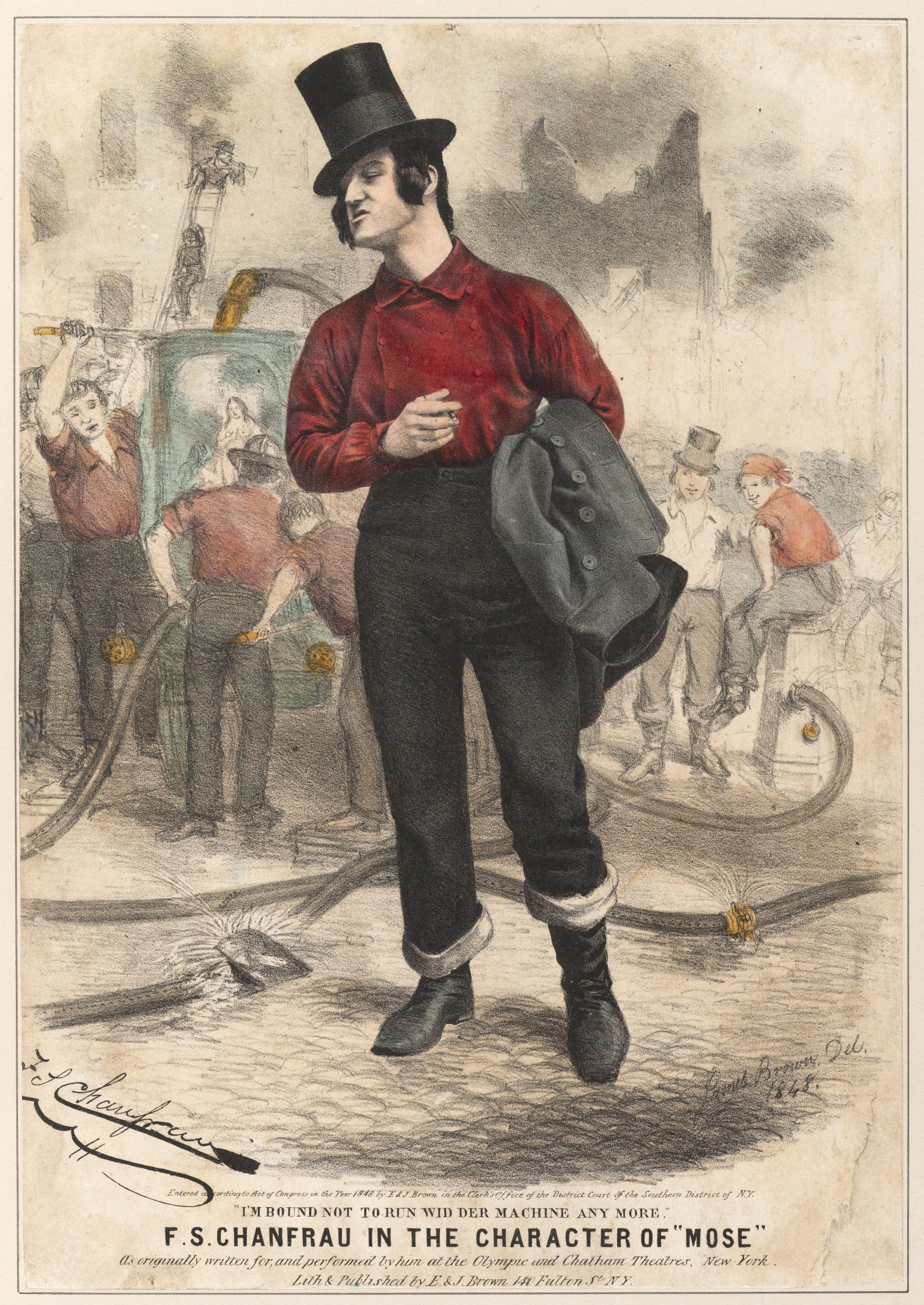
Moses Humphrey, a Bowery grocer, was the inspiration for Mose the Fireboy, the quintessential Bowery B'hoy folk hero

In the Antebellum Period, the population of single working men living in lower Manhattan increased significantly. These young men were drawn to the city by rising wages for laborers, brought about by growing technology and industrialization that followed the War of 1812. Typically firemen or mechanics, boys spent their free time in the theaters and bars that surrounded their living wards around the Bowery. The Bowery Boys were also known for their gang activity, engaging in fights and riots with members of opposing gangs such as the Dead Rabbits.

Writer James Dabney McCabe observed of the Bowery B'hoy in 1872:

“You might see him ‘strutting along like a king’ with his breeches stuck in his boots, his coat on his arm, his flaming red shirt tied at the collar with a cravat such as could be seen nowhere else...None so ready as he for a fight, none so quick to resent the intrusion of a respectable man into his haunts.”

The term B'hoy was also widely used to describe a young man of the working-class who enjoyed drinking, seeking out adventure, and finding fun. Bowery Boys had a distaste for aristocracy and a love of independence, bravery, and loyalty.

While various gangs were called the "Bowery Boys" throughout the antebellum years, Mike Walsh is often considered to have founded the gang's first incarnation. Walsh, an Irish-born Protestant, shaped the Bowery Boys into an anti-Catholic Irish gang. He acted as a political leader to the Bowery Boys and was elected to the United States House of Representatives. When he died in 1859, his obituary, published in The Subterranean and thought to have been written by Walt Whitman, read that the leader of the Bowery Boys was an "original talent, rough, full of passionate impulses...but he lacked balance, caution-the ship often seemed devoid of both ballast and rudder".

During the New York Draft Riots of 1863, the Bowery Boys reached the height of their power, taking part in the looting of much of New York City while fighting with rival gangs, the New York Police, and the Union Army. By the end of the decade, the gang had split into various factions and the Bowery Boys gradually disappeared.

== Appearance ==
Appearance was of great importance to Bowery Boys, who dressed for both flair and convenience. A typical Bowery Boy wore:

“[a] black silk hat, smoothly brushed, sitting precisely upon the top of his head, hair well oiled, and lying closely to the skin, long in front, short behind, cravat a-la sailor, with the shirt collar turned over it, vest of fancy silk, large flowers, black frock coat, no jewelry, except in a few instances, where the insignia of the engine company to which the wearer belongs, as a breastpin, black pants, one or two years behind the fashion, heavy boots, and a cigar about half smoked, in the left corner of his mouth, as nearly perpendicular as it is possible to be got. He has a peculiar swing, not exactly a swagger, to his walk, but a swing, which nobody but a Bowery boy can imitate.”

George Foster, a travel writer, wrote in 1850:

“Who are the b’hoys and g’hals of New York?...sometimes a stout clerk in a jobbing-house, oftener a junior partner at a wholesale grocery, and still more frequently a respectable young butcher with big arms and broad shoulders, in a blue coat with a silk hat and a crape wound about its base, and who is known familiarly as a ‘Bowery Boy!'”

== The Bowery Theatre ==
The Bowery Boys were known to frequent theaters in New York City. Richard Butsch in The Making Of American Audiences notes, "they brought the street into the theater, rather than shaping the theater into an arena of the public sphere". The Bowery Theatre, in particular, was a favorite among the Bowery Boys. The Bowery Theatre was built in 1826 and soon became a theater for the working man. Walt Whitman described the theater as "packed from ceiling to pit with its audience, mainly of alert, well-dressed, full-blooded young and middle aged men, the best average of American-born mechanics". Plays even began to appear in theaters frequented by the Bowery Boys with shows about Bowery Boys themselves, particularly, a character named Moses whom many Bowery Boys deemed "the real thing". It was not uncommon for men to drink, smoke, and meet with prostitutes in the theater. The Bowery Boys dominated the theater in the early 19th century and theater was considered to be a "male club".

Higher wages brought higher standards of living for working-class citizens, which provided them both social mobility and the ability to indulge in entertainment. As Bowery B'hoys and similar characters made up a significant portion of theater audiences, theaters such as the Bowery Theater and the Chatham Theatre created their playbills to suit the audience's interests. Plays were done alongside other acts, such as popular songs and dances, Minstrelsy, and other sketches or demonstrations. Even Shakespeare's works, which gained popularity at the time, were altered to include colloquial language and popular music.

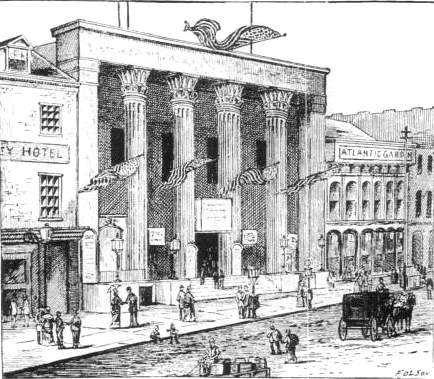
Bowery Theatre, the Bowery, Manhattan, New York City

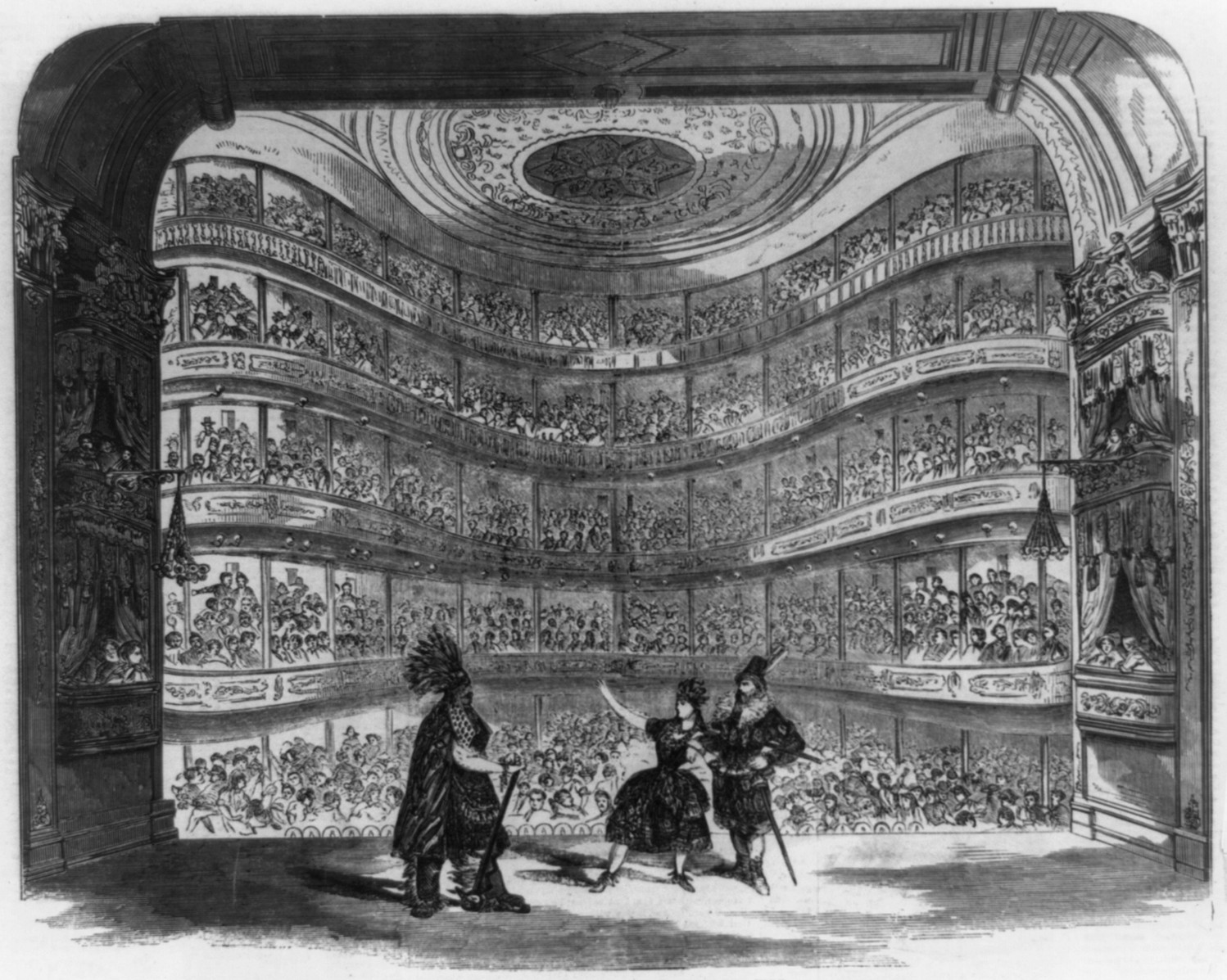
The interior of the Bowery Theatre

=== Rowdiness ===
Rowdy Bowery Boy audiences mostly sat in the theater's pit, and often requested that songs, dances, and scenes be repeated multiple times or added impromptu to the performance, even taking over the stage and participating in the drama at times. Bowery Boys and other audience members threw food and booed or hissed performers they didn't enjoy.

Frances Trollope described similar behavior in Cincinnati audiences at the time, narrating,

"the spitting was incessant; and the mixed smell of onions and whiskey was enough to make one feel even the Drakes acting dearly bought...the heels thrown higher than the head, the entire rear of the person presented to the audience...and when a patriotic fit seized them, and 'Yankee Doodle' was called for, every man seemed to think his reputation as a citizen depended on the noise he made."

Some found this behavior more tolerable:

“Walt Whitman warmly recalled the Bowery Theatre around the year 1840, where he could look up to the first tier of boxes and see ‘the faces of the leading authors, poets, editors, of those times,’ while he sat in the pit surrounded by the ‘slang, wit, occasional shirt sleeves, and a picturesque freedom of looks and manners, with a rude, good-nature and restless movement’ of cartmen, butchers, firemen, and mechanics.”

=== Rioting ===
The Bowery Boys, among other groups, participated in the Astor Place Riots of 1849, which were fueled by class tensions in New York City as well as a drawn-out feud between actors Edwin Forrest and William Macready.

== Theatrical representation ==
Benjamin Baker's play A Glance at New York, written in 1848, created popular depictions of a Bowery Boy and Gal. Their sayings and the names of the characters, Mose and Liza, were picked up and used popularly to refer to b'hoys and g'hals outside of the production. Even travel writers used these characterizations to describe Bowery Boys and Gals to tourists and readers abroad.

=== Mose ===
Based on grocer Moses Humphrey, this character was exemplary of a Bowery Boy of New York. He discusses theater with Lize, his gal, goes on a fire call, and shows his heart when he's left with an orphaned baby by saying, "The fire boys may be a little rough outside, but they're all right." Written phonetically in the boys' typical accent, Mose's dialogue includes sayings that were picked up by audience members and used in daily life. As described by the New York Herald, "the lithographers are multiplying his likeness throughout the city. The boys in the street have caught his sayings.." Throughout the play, Mose is ready to fight anyone who might oppose him or his companions. The play ends with an act of bravery on his part, as he leaves to help a fellow fireman, Sykesy, in a fight.

=== Lize ===
The Bowery Gal was depicted in this play as Eliza Stebbins, or "Lize". George G. Foster writes on the character of Lize: "The gal is as independent in her tastes and habits as Mose himself. Her very walk has a swing of mischief and defiance in it, and the tones of her voice are loud, hearty, and free." In a bonnet and mismatching styles, her outfit fits the gal sensibility to go against the current fashions of respectable society.

=== Reception ===
The characters of Mose and Lize were revisited by other playwrights and writers, including Ned Buntline in his story, The Mysteries and Miseries of New York.

Travel writer George G. Foster wrote of the play: "With the exception of the single drama which Mr. Chanfrau, slight as is its plot and meager and commonplace as are its incidents, has been able by the force of his genius to confer a new character upon the stage, nothing has been adequately done to begin imparting to our literature the original and rich wealth lying latent in the life and history of Mose and Lize."

== In popular culture ==
- The main character of Patricia Beatty's 1987 historical children's fiction novel Charley Skedaddle is a Bowery Boy before enlisting as a drummer in the Union army.
- The 2002 Martin Scorsese film Gangs of New York features a semi-fictionalized version of "Bill the Butcher" as a central character belonging to a gang of nativists. The Bowery Boys themselves are also briefly depicted including their feud with the Dead Rabbits and their firefighting tradition.
- The 2025 Netflix TV show House of Guinness features the Bowery Boys in Episode 4.

== Gallery ==
Bowery Boys with soap-locks hairstyle, smoking cigars and wearing working class fashionable clothing, circa 1840–1847.

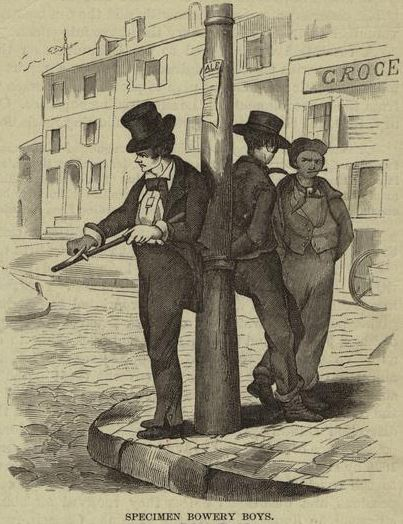
Bowery Boys on a street corner in the Bowery.

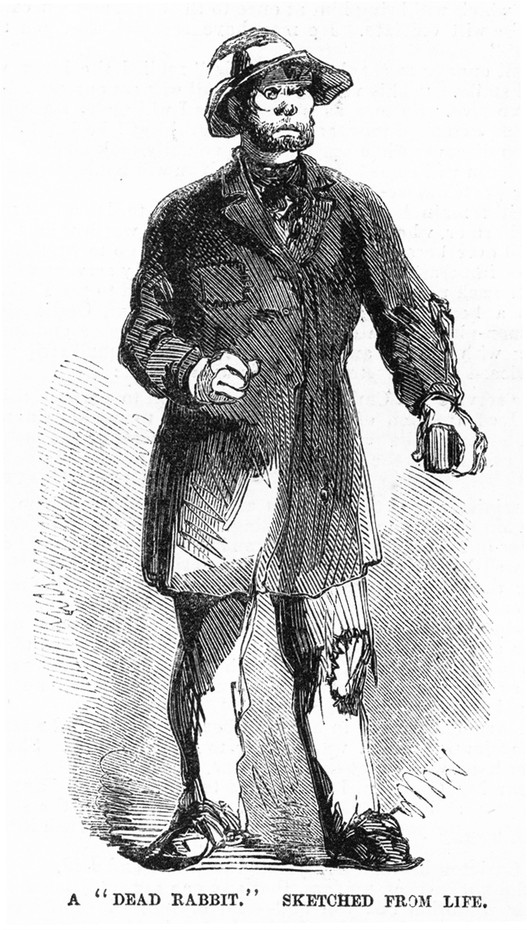
Member of Dead Rabbits street gang, the Bowery Boys' arch rivals.

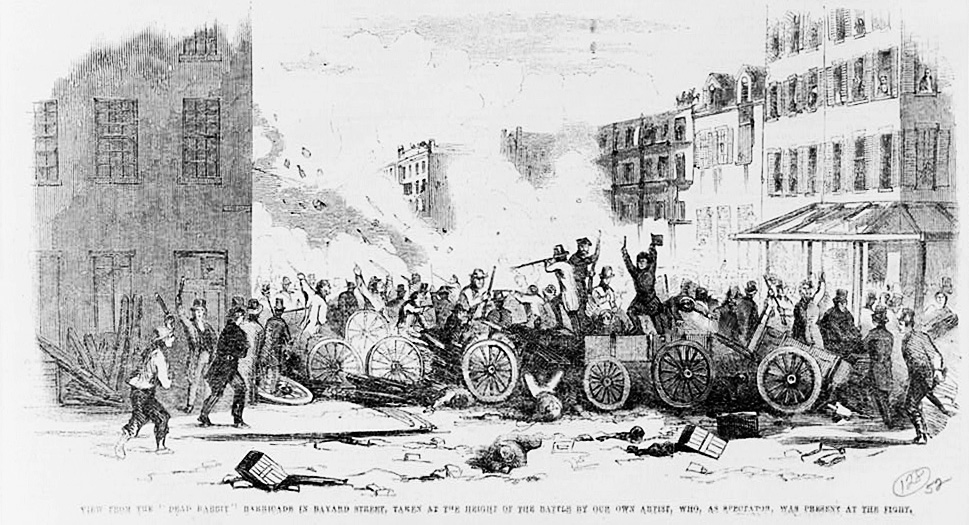
A fight between the Dead Rabbits and the Bowery Boys during the 1857 Dead Rabbits Riot.

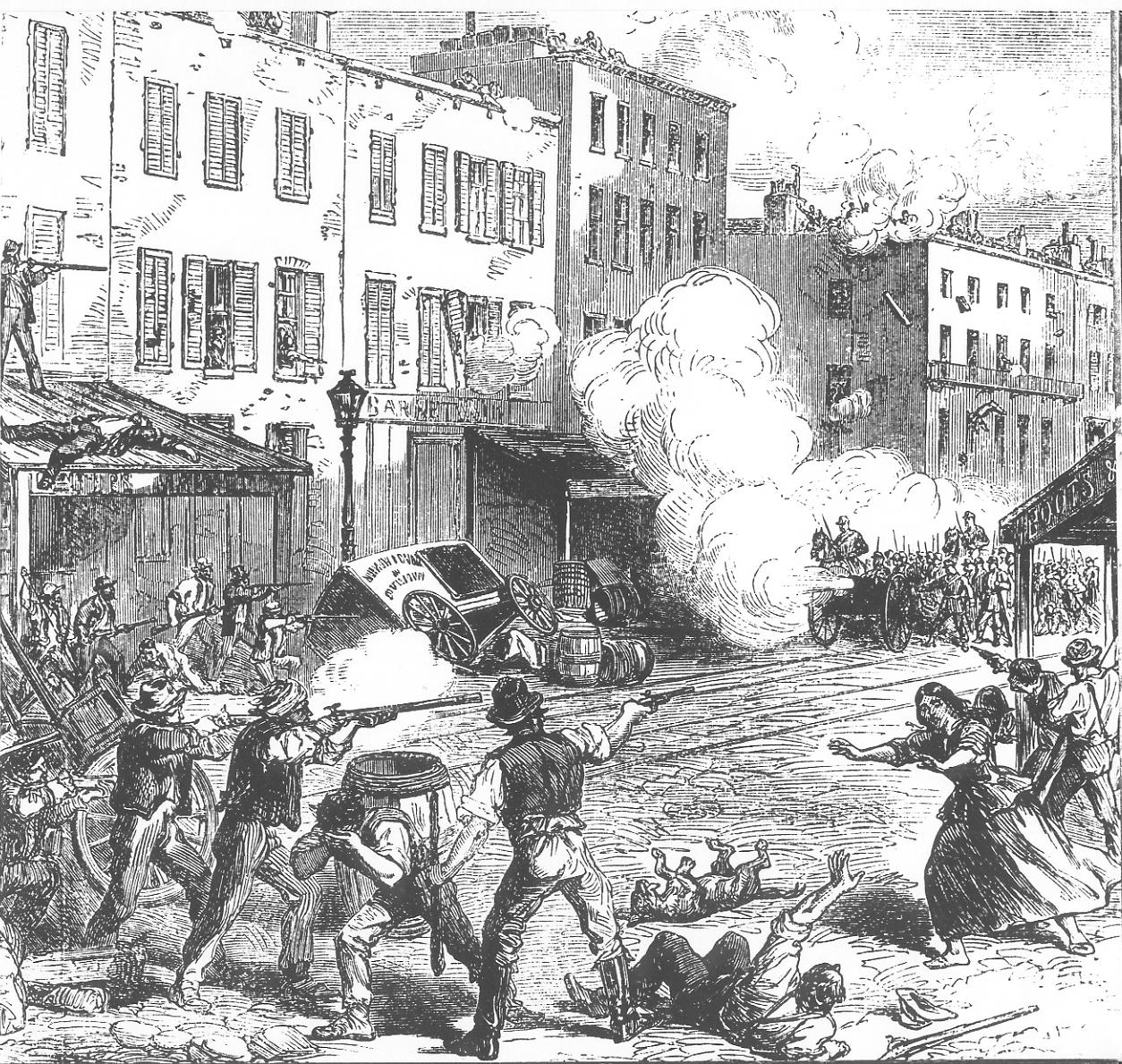
Bowery gangs clashing with police and Union Army troops in the 1863 New York City draft riots.

== Notable Bowery Boys ==
- Mike Walsh, gang leader
- William "Bill the Butcher" Poole, gang leader

== See also ==
- B'hoy and g'hal
- The Bowery Boys, fictional characters portrayed in a series of films
- The Bowery Boys: New York City History (audio podcast)
