= Atlantic Guards =

19th-century New York City street gang

- Founding location: Bowery, Manhattan, New York City
- Years active: 1840s–1860s
- Territory: Bowery, Manhattan, New York City
- Ethnicity: Non-Irish American
- Membership (est.): ?
- Criminal activities: Assault, street fighting, knife fighting
- Allies: Bowery Boys, American Guards, O'Connell Guards, True Blue Americans, American Republican Party (American Nativist Party, American Party), Order of the Star Spangled Banner (Anti-immigrant secret society)
- Rivals: Dead Rabbits

The Atlantic Guards were a 19th-century American street gang active in New York City from the 1840s to the 1860s. It was one of the original, and among the most important gangs of the early days of the Bowery, along with the Bowery Boys, American Guards, O'Connell Guards, and the True Blue Americans.

Although engaging in street fighting, these gangs were generally less criminal in nature than their Five Point rivals, stopping "just short of murder", instead formed as nativist vigilante groups focused on protecting Bowery neighborhoods. It was common for Bowery and Five Point gangs alike to imitate (and sometimes parody) actual military companies and wear signature "uniforms" (e.g. the stove pipe hats and long black frock coats of the True Blue Americans). The Atlantic Guards wore a red stripe on their trousers.

A longtime ally of the Bowery Boys, they were referred to by journalist Carleton Beals as "Bill "the Butcher" Poole's Christopher Street thugs" and often warred with the Irish American gangs of the Five Points, most especially, the Dead Rabbits. This feud would continue throughout the 1840s and 50s, at the height of the Know Nothing movement, culminating in the Dead Rabbits Riot in 1857. The riot originally began with a Five Points raid on No. 42 Bowery, the headquarters of the Bowery Boys and the Atlantic Guards, in "celebration" of the Fourth of July. The Five Pointers showered the saloon with sticks and paving stone before moving on to the nearby Branch Hotel. The guests managed to hold off the mob until they were driven off by an estimated 300 Atlantic Guards and Bowery Boys. Fighting continued, however, and soon escalated into a citywide gang war lasting two days before order was restored by the New York State Militia under Major-General Charles W. Sandford.

== In popular culture ==
- The Atlantic Guards are referenced in the historical novels Andersonville (1993) by MacKinlay Kantor and The Coming Storm (2011) by Dominic Lagan.
