= Tyler Anbinder =

American historian (born 1962)

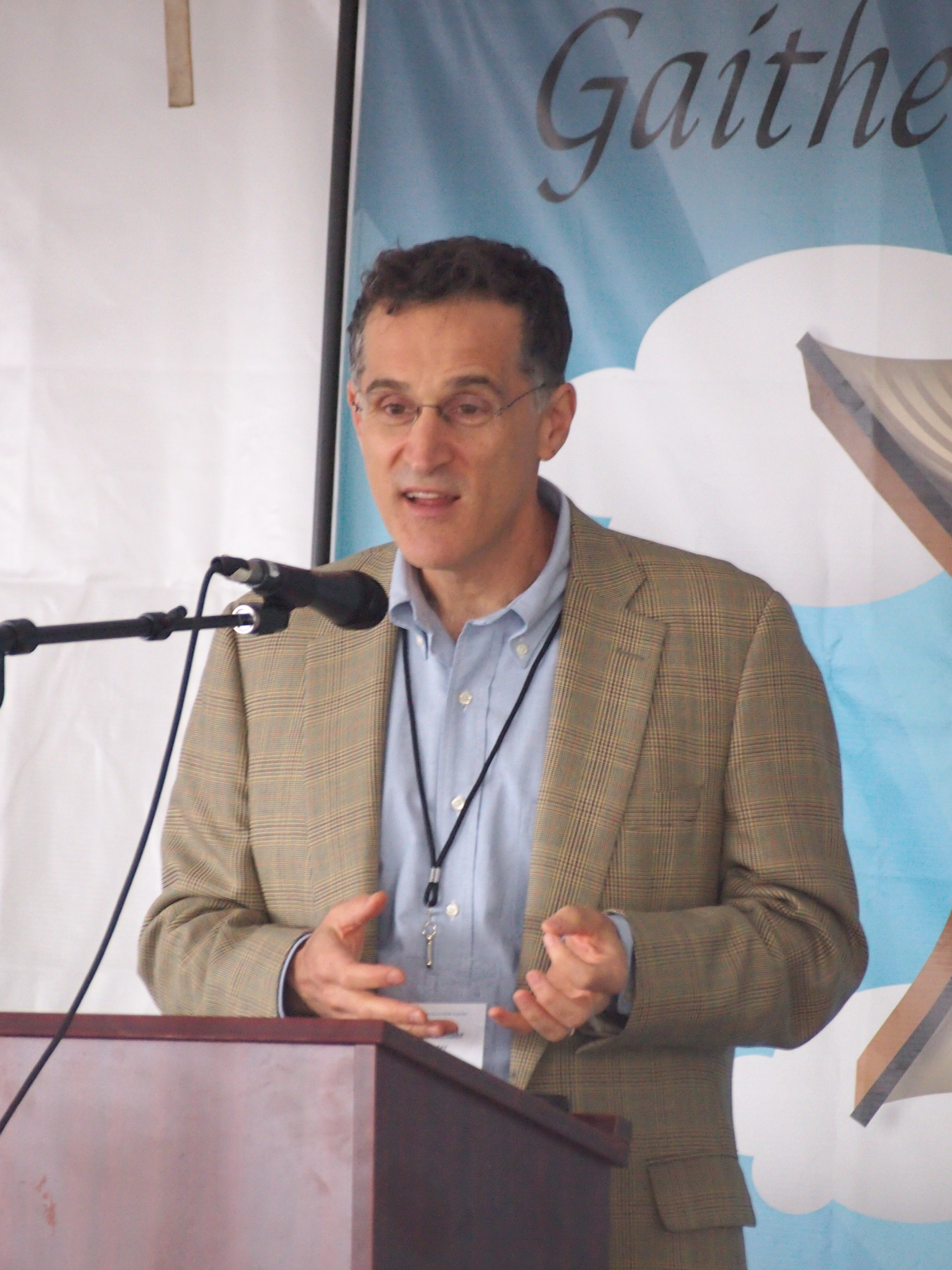
Tyler Anbinder in 2017

Tyler Anbinder (born September 26, 1962) is an American historian known for his influential work on the pre-civil war period in U.S. history.

== Books ==
- Nativism and Slavery: The Northern Know Nothings and the Politics of the 1850s. New York: Oxford University Press, 1992. Winner, 1993, Avery Craven Prize of the Organization of American Historians for the most original book on the coming of the Civil War, the Civil War years, or the Era of Reconstruction.
- Five Points: The Nineteenth-Century New York City Neighborhood that Invented Tap Dance, Stole Elections, and Became the World's Most Notorious Slum. New York: Free Press, 2001. Named a Notable Book by the New York Times (2001) and one of "Twenty-Five Books to Remember" by the New York Public Library (2001).
- City of Dreams: The 400-Year Epic History of Immigrant New York. Published October 18, 2016 by Houghton Mifflin Harcourt, ISBN 9780544104655 Winner of the Mark Lynton History Prize.
- Plentiful Country: The Great Potato Famine and the Making of Irish New York. Little, Brown and Company, 2024.
