= Roach Guards =

19th-century NYC street gang

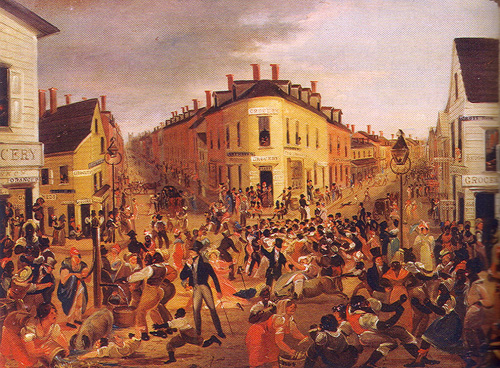
- George Catlin painting of the Five Points, Manhattan, New York City in 1827 the slum territory of the "Roach Guards" and the other Irish criminal gangs
- Founded by: Ted Roach
- Founding location: Five Points Manhattan, New York City
- Years active: 1820s-1860s
- Territory: Five Points, Manhattan, New York City
- Ethnicity: Irish and Irish American
- Membership (est.): ?
- Criminal activities: street fighting, knife fighting, assault, murder, robbery
- Allies: Tammany Hall
- Rivals: Bowery Boys, Atlantic Guards

The Roach Guards were an ethnically Irish criminal gang in the Five Points neighborhood of New York City in the early to mid-19th century. The gang was originally formed to protect New York liquor merchants in Five Points and soon began committing robbery and murder. The Roach Guards took their name from their founder and leader Ted Roach.

The Roach Guards began fighting with rivals the Bowery Boys. Some former Roach Guard members were called the Dead Rabbits by the media. The internal feud was especially violent as they fought over the Five Points area. Despite constant fighting, they managed to hold their own in the "slugger battles" against the more organized and disciplined "Bowery Boys". The Roach Guards, however, began to decline during the 1850s, disappearing entirely by the end of the American Civil War in 1865.
