= Tom show =

Plays loosely based on the novel 'Uncle Tom's Cabin'

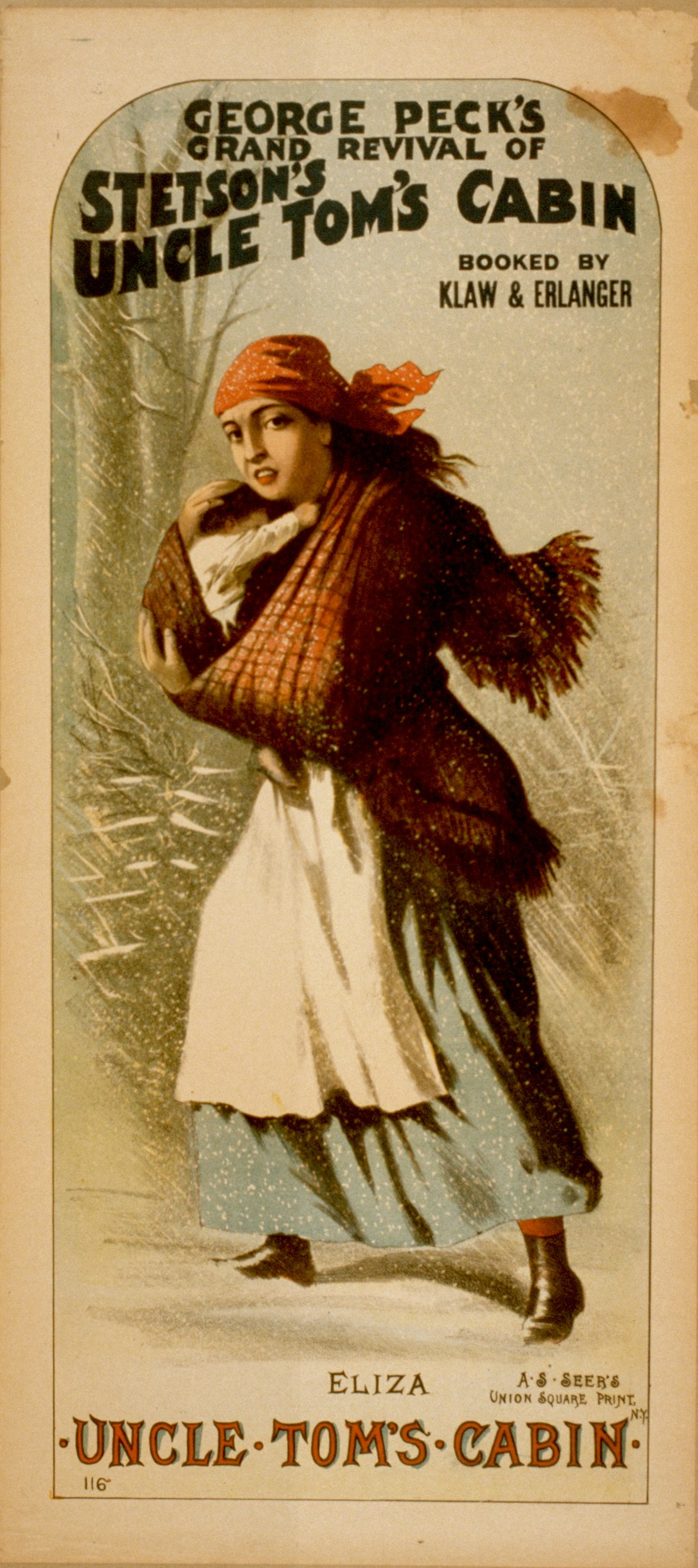
1886 poster for "Stetson's Uncle Tom's Cabin"

Tom show is a general term for any play or musical based (often only loosely) on the 1852 novel Uncle Tom's Cabin by Harriet Beecher Stowe. The novel attempts to depict the harsh reality of slavery. Due to the weak copyright laws at the time, a number of unauthorized plays based on the novel were staged for decades, many of them mocking the novel's social message, and leading to the pejorative term "Uncle Tom".

Even though Uncle Tom's Cabin was the best-selling novel of the 19th century, far more Americans of that time saw the story in a stage play or musical than read the book. In 1902, it was reported that a quarter million of these presentations had already been performed in the United States. Some of these shows were essentially minstrel shows that utilized caricatures and stereotypes of black people, and thus inverting the intent of the novel. "Tom shows" were popular in the United States from the 1850s through the early 1900s.

== The shows ==
Stage plays based on Uncle Tom's Cabin—"Tom shows"—began to appear while the story itself was still being serialized. These plays varied tremendously in their politics—some faithfully reflected Stowe's sentimentalized antislavery politics, while others were more moderate, or even pro-slavery. A number of the productions also featured songs by Stephen Foster, including "My Old Kentucky Home," "Old Folks at Home," and "Massa's in the Cold, Cold Ground."

Stowe herself never authorized dramatization of her work, because of her puritanical distrust of drama (although she did eventually go to see George Aiken's version, and, according to Francis Underwood, was "delighted" by Caroline Howard's portrayal of Topsy). Asa Hutchinson of the Hutchinson Family Singers, whose antislavery politics closely matched those of Stowe, tried and failed to get her permission to stage an official version; her refusal left the field clear for any number of adaptations, some launched for (various) political reasons and others as simply commercial theatrical ventures.

Eric Lott, in his book Love and Theft: Blackface Minstrelsy and the American Working Class, estimates that at least three million people saw these plays, as many as the novel's worldwide sales. Some of these shows were basically just blackface minstrel shows only loosely based on the novel, and their grossly exaggerated caricatures of black people further perpetuated, for purposes of mockery, some of the stereotypes that Stowe had used more innocently.

== Productions ==
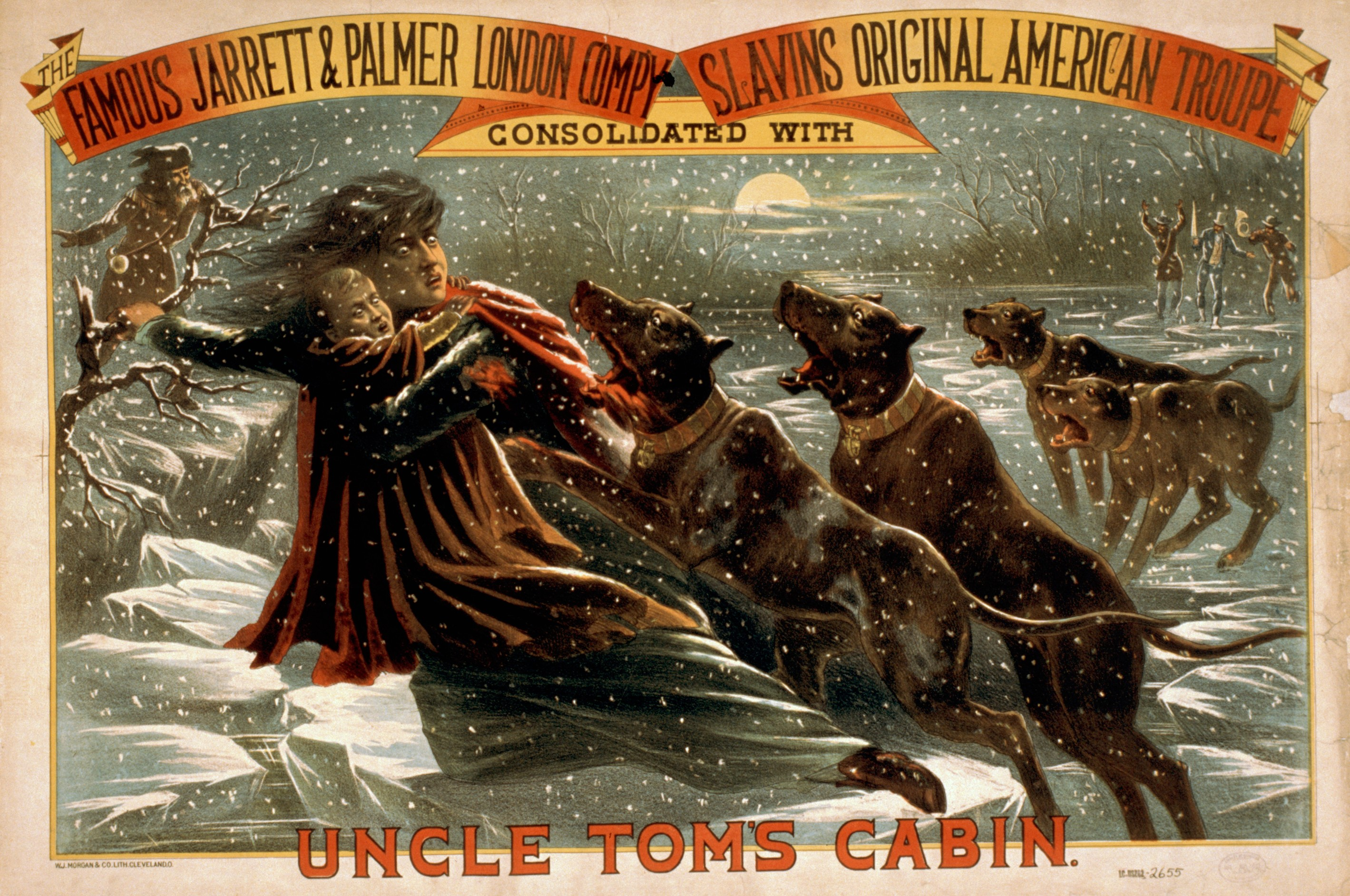
Eliza crossing the ice, in an 1881 theater poster for a production by the Jarrett & London Company and Slavin's Original American Troupe.

All "Tom shows" appear to have incorporated elements of melodrama and blackface minstrelsy.

The first serious attempt at anything like a faithful stage adaptation was a one-hour play by C. W. Taylor at Purdy's National Theater (New York City); it ran for about ten performances in August–September 1852 sharing a bill with a blackface burlesque featuring T. D. Rice. Rice, famous in the 1830s for his comic and clearly racist blackface character Jim Crow, later became the most celebrated actor to play the title role of Tom; when Rice opened in H.E. Stevens play of Uncle Tom's Cabin in January 1854 at New York's Bowery Theatre, the Spirit of the Times' reviewer described him as "decidedly the best personator of negro character who has appeared in any drama."

The best-known "Tom Shows" were those of George Aiken and H.J. Conway.

Aiken's original Uncle Tom's Cabin focused almost entirely on Little Eva (played by child star Cordelia Howard); a sequel, The Death of Uncle Tom, or the Religion of the Lonely told Tom's own story. The two were ultimately combined in an unprecedented evening-long six-act play. According to Lott, it is generally faithful to Stowe's novel, although it plays down the trickster characters of Sam and Andy and variously adds or expands the roles of some farcical white characters instead. It also focuses heavily on George Harris; The New York Times reported that his defiant speech received "great cheers" from an audience of Bowery b'hoys and g'hals. Even this most sympathetic of "Tom shows" clearly borrowed heavily from minstrelsy: not only were the slave roles all played by white actors in blackface, but Stephen Foster's "Old Folks at Home" was played in the scene where Tom is sold down the river. After a long and successful run beginning November 15, 1852 in Troy, New York, the play opened in New York City July 18, 1853, where its success was even greater.

The version by Aiken is perhaps the best known stage adaptation, released just a few months after the novel was published. This six-act behemoth also set an important precedent by being the first show on Broadway to stand on its own, without the performance of other entertainments or any afterpiece. Most of Aiken's dialogue was taken verbatim from Stowe's novel, and his adaptation included four full musical numbers written by the producer, George C. Howard. Another legacy of Aiken's version is its reliance upon very different locations all portrayed on the same stage. This reliance led to large sets and set a precedent for the future days of film. By focusing on the stark and desperate situations of his characters, Aiken appealed to the emotions of his audiences. By combining this melodramatic approach with the content of Stowe's novel, Aiken helped to create a powerful visual indictment against the institution of slavery.

Conway's production opened in Boston the same day Aiken's opened in Troy; P. T. Barnum brought it to his American Museum in New York November 7, 1853. Its politics were much more moderate. Sam and Andy become, in Lott's words, "buffoons". Criticism of slavery was placed largely in the mouth of a newly introduced Yankee character, a reporter named Penetrate Partyside. St. Clare's role was expanded, and turned into more of a pro-slavery advocate, articulating the politics of a John C. Calhoun. Legree rigs the auction that gets him ownership of Tom (as against Stowe's and Aiken's portrayal of oppression as the normal mode of slavery, not an abuse of the system by a cheater). Beyond this, Conway gave his play a happy ending, with Tom and various other slaves freed.

Showmen felt that Stowe's novel had a flaw in that there was no clearly defined comic character, so there was no role for a comedian, and consequently little relief from the tragedy. Eventually it was found that the minor character of Marks the Lawyer could be played as a broad caricature for laughs, dressing him in foppish clothes, often equipped with a dainty umbrella. Some productions even had him make an entrance mounted astride a pig.

== Diluting the message of Stowe's book ==
"Tom shows" were so popular that there were even pro-slavery versions. Among the most popular was Uncle Tom's Cabin as It Is: The Southern Uncle Tom, produced in 1852 at the Baltimore Museum. Lott mentions numerous "offshoots, parodies, thefts, and rebuttals" including a full-scale play by Christy's Minstrels and a parody by Conway himself called Uncle Pat's Cabin, and records that the story in its many variants "dominated northern popular culture… for several years".

According to Eric Lott, even those "Tom shows" which stayed relatively close to Stowe's novel played down the feminist aspects of the book and Stowe's criticisms of capitalism, and turned her anti-slavery politics into anti-Southern sectionalism. Francis Underwood, a contemporary, wrote that Aiken's play had also lost the "lightness and gayety" of Stowe's book. Nonetheless, Lott argues, the plays increased sympathy for the slaves among the Northern white working class (which had been somewhat alienated from the abolitionist movement by its perceived elitist backing).

== Influence ==
The influence of the "Tom shows" can be found in a number of plays from the 1850s: most obviously, C.W. Taylor's dramatization of Stowe's Dred, but also J. T. Trowbridge's abolitionist play Neighbor Jackwood, Dion Boucicault's The Octoroon, and a play called The Insurrection, based on John Brown's raid on Harpers Ferry.

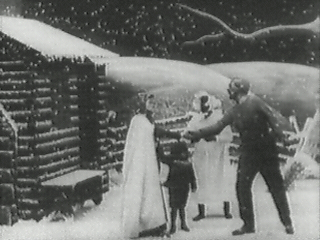
Still from Edwin S. Porter's 1903 version of Uncle Tom's Cabin, which was one of the first "full length" movies. The still shows Eliza telling Uncle Tom that she has been sold and that she is running away to save her child.

The influence of the "Tom shows" also carried over into the silent film era (with Uncle Tom's Cabin being the most-filmed story of that time period). This was due to the continuing popularity of both the book and "Tom shows," meaning audiences were already familiar with the characters and the plot, making it easier for the film to be understood without spoken words.

Several of the early film versions of Uncle Tom's Cabin were essentially filmed versions of "Tom shows." These included:

- A 1903 version of Uncle Tom's Cabin, which was one of the earliest "full-length" movies (although "full-length" at that time meant between 10 and 14 minutes). This film, directed by Edwin S. Porter, used white actors in blackface in the major roles and black performers only as extras. This version was similar to many of the "Tom Shows" of earlier decades and featured a large number of black stereotypes (such as having the slaves dance in almost any context, including at a slave auction).
- Another film version from 1903 was directed by Siegmund Lubin and starred Lubin as Simon Legree. While no copies of Lubin's film still exist, according to accounts the movie was similar to Porter's version and reused the sets and costumes from a "Tom Show."

As cinema replaced vaudeville and other types of live variety entertainment, "Tom shows" slowly disappeared. J. C. Furnas, in his book Goodbye to Uncle Tom, stated that he had seen a production in the 1920s in Ohio; the last touring group specializing in "Tomming" he could locate was apparently operating as late as the 1950s.
