= Joseph Foster =

Joseph Foster may refer to:

- Joseph Foster (politician) (born 1959), American politician in New Hampshire
- Joseph Foster (genealogist) (1844–1905), English genealogist
- Joey Foster (born 1982), British racing driver
- Joey Foster Ellis (born 1984), American functional artist and craftsman
- Slaughter Joe (born 1960), British musician, also known as Joe Foster
- Joe B. Foster (1934–2020), American businessman, oilman and philanthropist
- Joe Foster (trade unionist) (born 1938), South African trade union leader
- Joseph Foster Barham I (1729–1789), English plantation owner, to 1750 known as Joseph Foster
- Joseph Markell Foster (born 1984), record producer
- Joseph William Foster (born 1935), co-founder of Reebok
- Joseph C. Foster (1804–1877), Scottish-born American stage manager and playwright
- Joseph Andoh Foster (born 1961), Ghanaian politician
- Joseph Foster (silversmith), American silversmith
- Joe Foster (racing driver), American racing driver in 2010 Rolex Sports Car Series season
- Joseph Foster, a character in Alias Nick Beal
