= Chanfrau =

Chanfrau is a surname. Notable people with the surname include:

- Frank Chanfrau (1824–1884), American actor and theatre manager
- Henrietta Baker Chanfrau (1837–1909), American stage actress
