= Rosanna Peers =

American criminal fenc

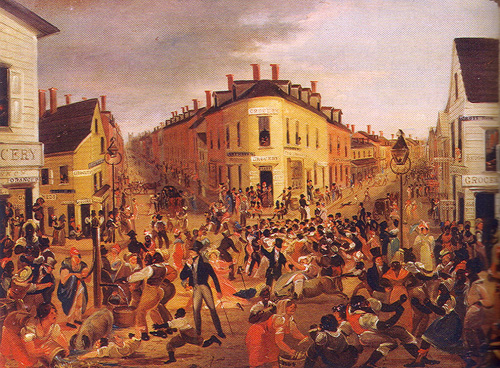
- George Catlin painting of the Five Points, Manhattan, New York City in 1827 in the slum territory of Rosanna Peers and her grocery store and the business establishment where the "Forty Thieves" the earliest known and first Irish criminal street gang in the city was formed in 1826
- Born: Unknown; Five Points, Manhattan, New York City, New York
- Died: 1840? Five Points, Manhattan, New York City, New York
- Occupations: grocer, saloon keeper, criminal fence

Rosanna Peers (?-1840) was an American criminal fence and underworld figure in New York City during the early-to mid 19th century. She is the earliest known business owner to begin actively dealing with the city's emerging underworld and whose Centre Street grocery store and dive bar, established in 1825 just south of Anthony Street (on the northern side of present-day Foley Square), was used as the longtime headquarters of the Forty Thieves upon their formation by Edward Coleman in 1826.

Her establishment was described as a sort of early underground speakeasy where "piles of decaying vegetables were displayed on racks outside the store" while Peers provided a back room "in which she sold the fiery liquor of the period at lower prices than it could be obtained in the recognized saloons". Her store would become a popular underworld hangout for criminals in the Five Points district and throughout the city during the next two decades. Peers' success encouraged others to open similar establishments along Anthony, Orange and Cross Streets catering to the New York underworld as the later-famous resorts, dance halls and saloons would originate from this area.
