= Albert Aiken =

Albert Aiken may refer to:

- Vic Aicken (Albert Victor Aicken, 1914–1972), Northern Irish footballer
- Albert W. Aiken (1846–1894), American actor and author
