= Hot Corn =

Hot Corn: Life Scenes in New York Illustrated
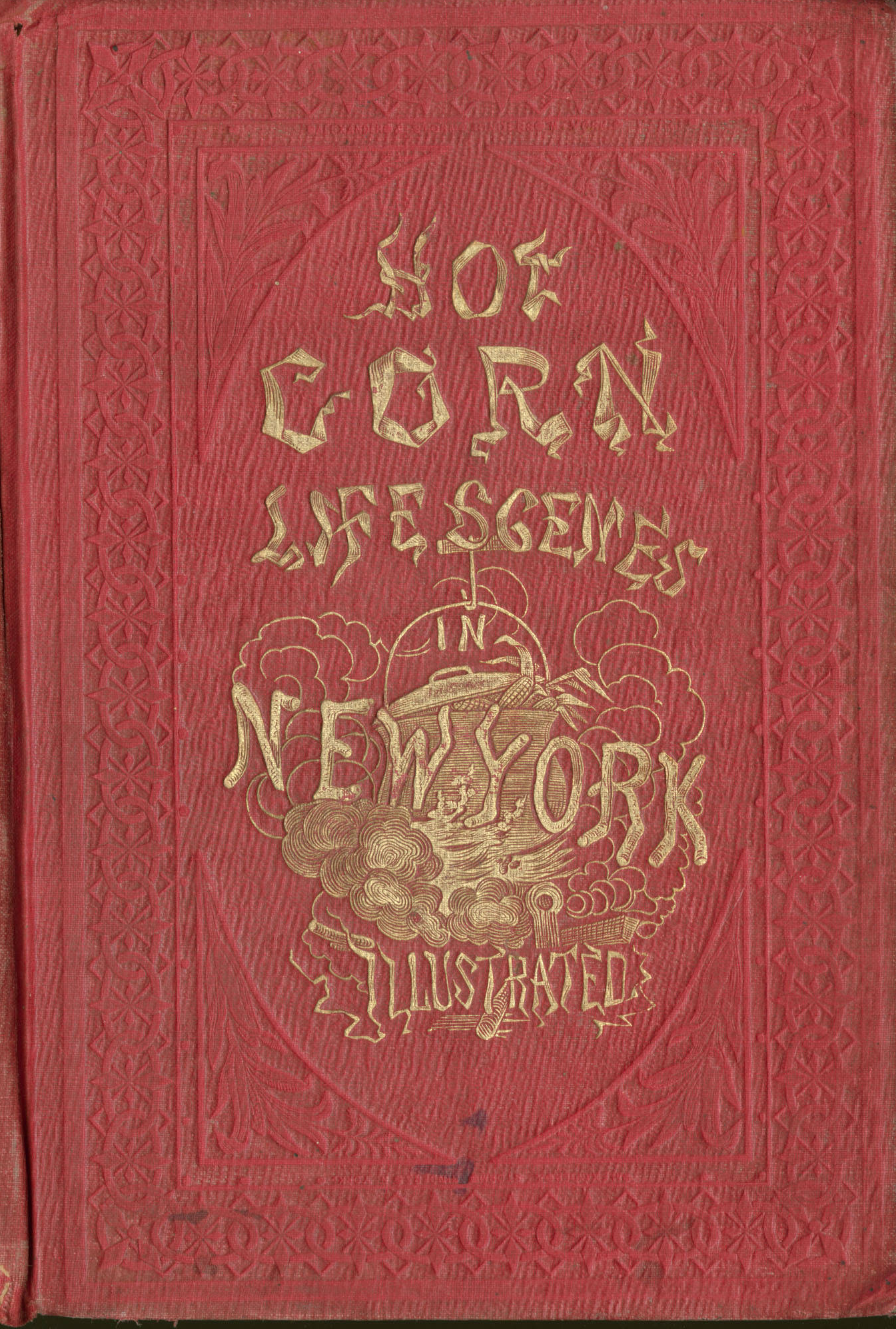
- Book cover of first edition
- Author: Solon Robinson
- Illustrator: John McLenan, (engraver Nathaniel Orr)
- Language: English
- Publisher: DeWitt and Davenport (New York)
- Publication date: 1854
- Pages: 408

Hot Corn: Life Scenes in New York Illustrated is a collection of short stories by Solon Robinson about the life of the poor in New York City, and was a "runaway bestseller" when first published in the United States in early 1854. Along with songs and plays based on the book's stories, which were first published in the New York Tribune, Hot Corn enjoyed a brief frenzy of popularity.

== Background ==
The book is a collection of stories set in New York City's impoverished Five Points neighborhood, and first appeared in the New York Tribune in 1853. One of stories was that of Little Katy, a "hot corn" (corn on the cob) seller on the street, who is beaten to death by her alcoholic mother who needs Katy's income to support her drinking, after Katy's corn supply is stolen.

== Reception ==
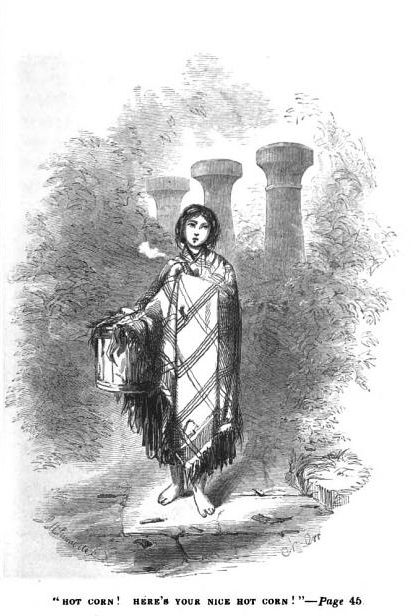
Illustration from the book of a "Hot Corn girl" by John McLenan, engraved by Nathaniel Orr

Though it garnered some positive press for promoting morality, especially in religious newspapers (for example, the Christian Secretary of Hartford, Connecticut said "The Hot Corn stories are eloquent appeals in favor of temperance and virtue"), the book (and stage adaptations) were also the subject of much scorn by critics. The New York Herald faulted the book for "giving minute descriptions of life in fashionable houses of ill-fame, and entering into the details of seduction, licentiousness and debauchery, with a gusto, ill concealed by the pretence of morality." The Southern Literary Messenger excoriated the book, proclaiming that "to say that the man who deliberately writes and prints such perilous and damnable stuff deserves a place in the penitentiary, is feebly to express our notion of the enormity of his offence."

Author Henry James wrote in his autobiography he was prevented from reading Hot Corn as a child; a copy was given to his father with the admonishment that it wasn't proper for children to read. James wrote that "so great became from that moment the mystery of the tabooed book, of whatever identity; the question, in my breast, of why, if it was to be so right for others, it was only to be wrong for me..... Neither then nor afterwards was the secret of "Hot Corn" revealed to me ..." Henry Wadsworth Longfellow took his sons to see one of the plays in April 1854 and called it "wretched stuff."

The Tribune trumpeted the popularity of the stories and plays, boasting in December 1853 that the stories had been reprinted "more than any other article that ever went the rounds of the press." Numerous songs based on the story of Little Katy, including ones performed at minstrel shows, also circulated.

The book was sold in a cloth edition for $1.25 and gilt edition for $2.00. A January 1854 advertisement in the Tribune claimed that forty thousand copies had already been ordered, putting the publisher 10,000 copies behind its production to date.

The feverish popularity of Hot Corn was not to last, and faded from popularity within eighteen months, though the plays saw occasional revivals.

Robinson later recounted that the book sold over 100,000 copies within a year of being released.

== Stage adaptations ==
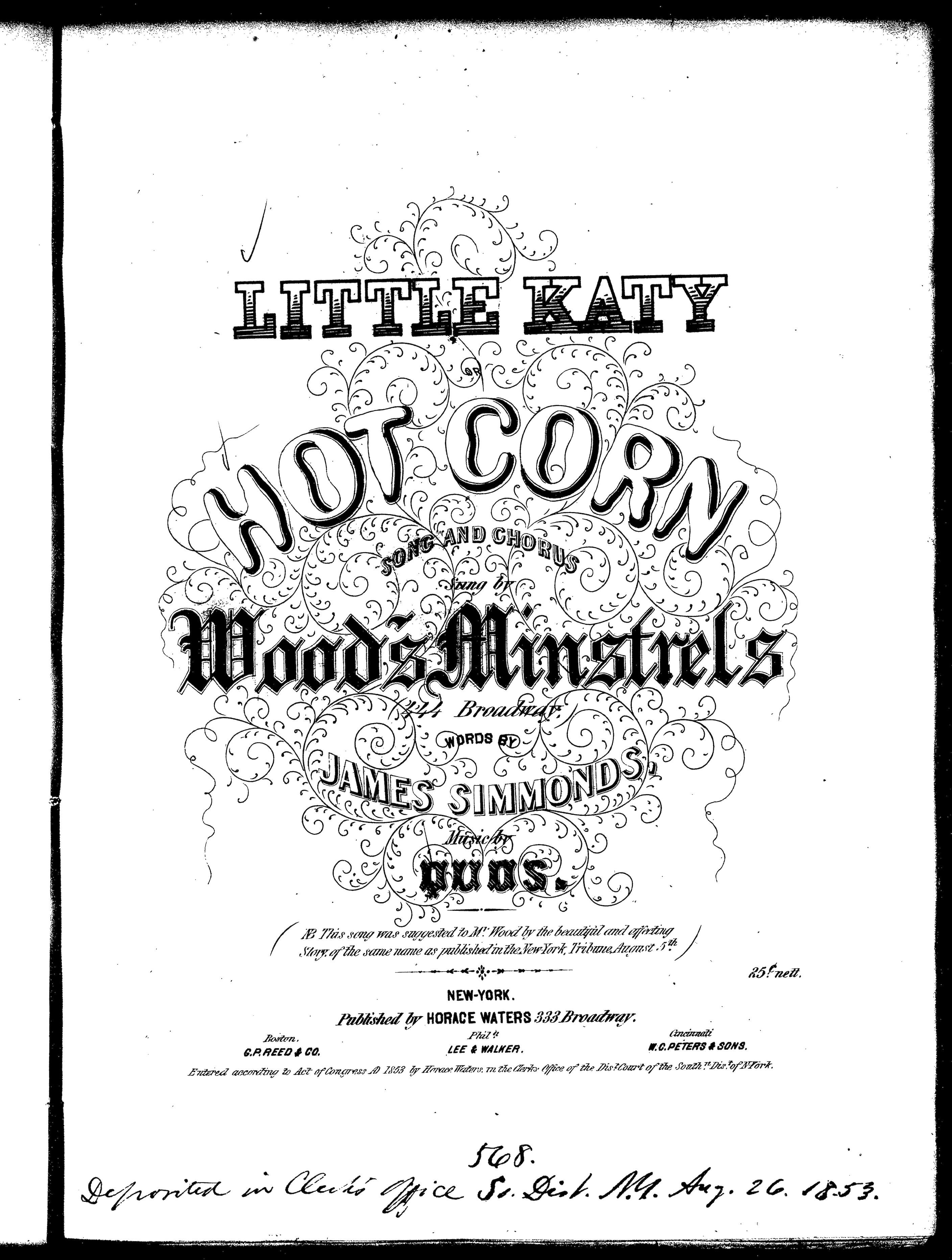
Sheet music cover for the Wood's Minstrels "Little Katy" or "Hot Corn", published within a month of the original publication of the Little Katy story in the Tribune

At least three temperance plays in 1853-54 were staged based (at least loosely, and in varying degrees) on the stories in the book, including Little Katy; or, The Hot Corn Girl, by C.W. Taylor, Hot Corn; or, Little Katy, which played at Barnum's American Museum, and The Hot Corn Girl at the Bowery Theatre. The plays (which varied in content) were said to be the second only to Uncle's Tom Cabin in popularity as a play in New York in the 1850s. The role of Little Katy was played by Cordelia Howard, daughter of George C. Howard, in one of the productions. Cordelia was also playing the role of Little Eva in Uncle Tom's Cabin at the same time.
