= New National Theatre =

New National Theatre may refer to:

- New National Theatre (Washington D.C.), a former name of the National Theatre in Washington D.C. used from 1885 to 1922
- New National Theatre Tokyo, a current theatre in Tokyo, Japan
- Purdy's New National Theatre, a New York City theatre active in the 1850s
