= Decherd =

Decherd can refer to:

- Robert Decherd (born 1951), American businessman involved with various news companies
- Decherd, Tennessee, a city in Franklin County, Tennessee, United States
- Decherd Turner, American academic
