= Harry Ransom Center =

Archive at the University of Texas at Austin

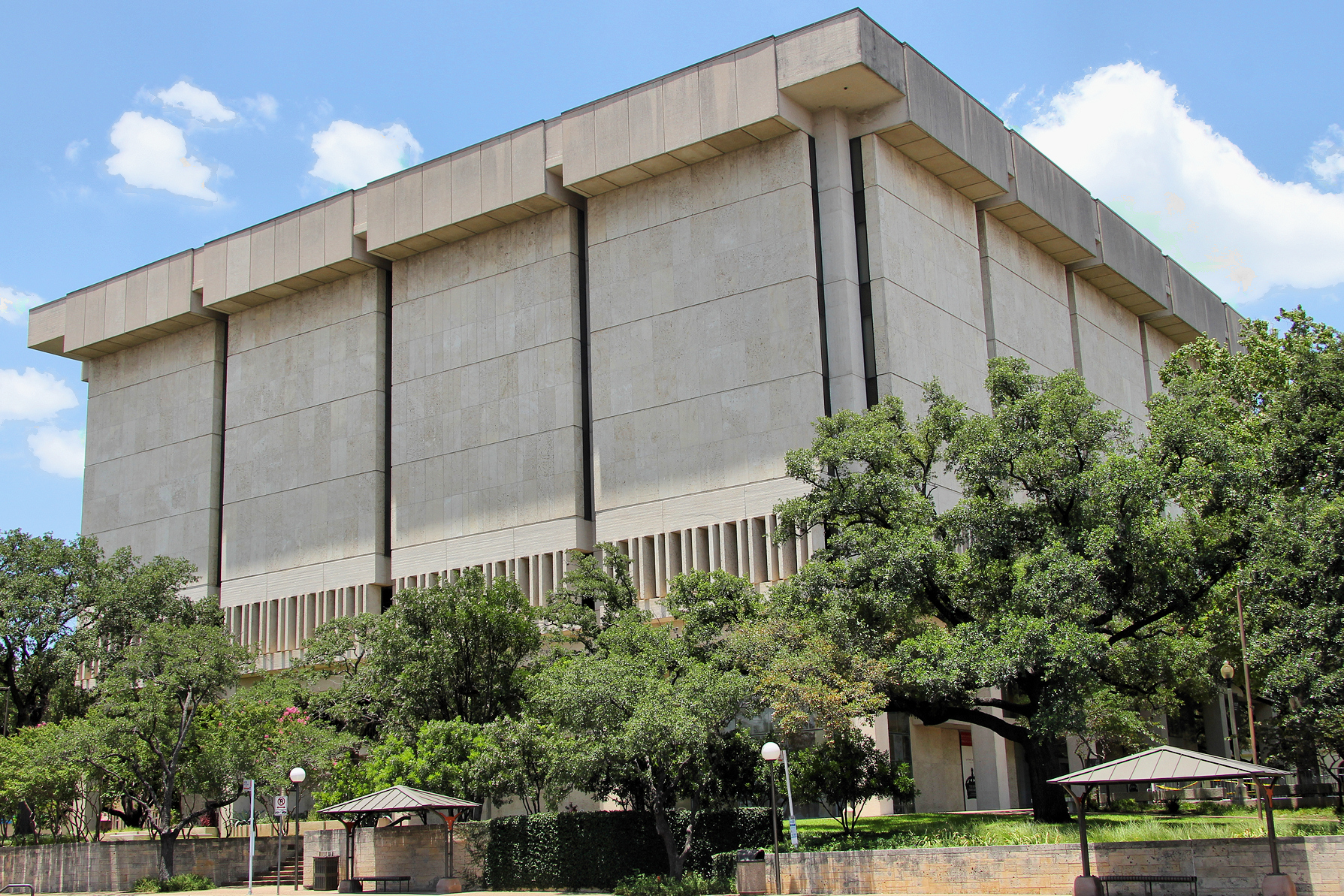
- The Harry Ransom Center in June 2012
- 30°17′04″N 97°44′28″W
- Location: Austin, Texas, US
- Type: Academic library
- Established: 1957

Other information
- Affiliation: University of Texas at Austin
- Website: www.hrc.utexas.edu

The Harry Ransom Center, known as the Humanities Research Center until 1983, is an archive, library, and museum at the University of Texas at Austin, specializing in the collection of literary and cultural artifacts from the Americas and Europe for the purpose of advancing the study of the arts and humanities. The Ransom Center houses 36 million literary manuscripts, one million rare books, five million photographs, and more than 100,000 works of art.

The center has a reading room for scholars and galleries which display rotating exhibitions of works and objects from the collections. In the 2015–16 academic year, the center hosted nearly 6,000 research visits, resulting in the publication of over 145 books.

== History ==
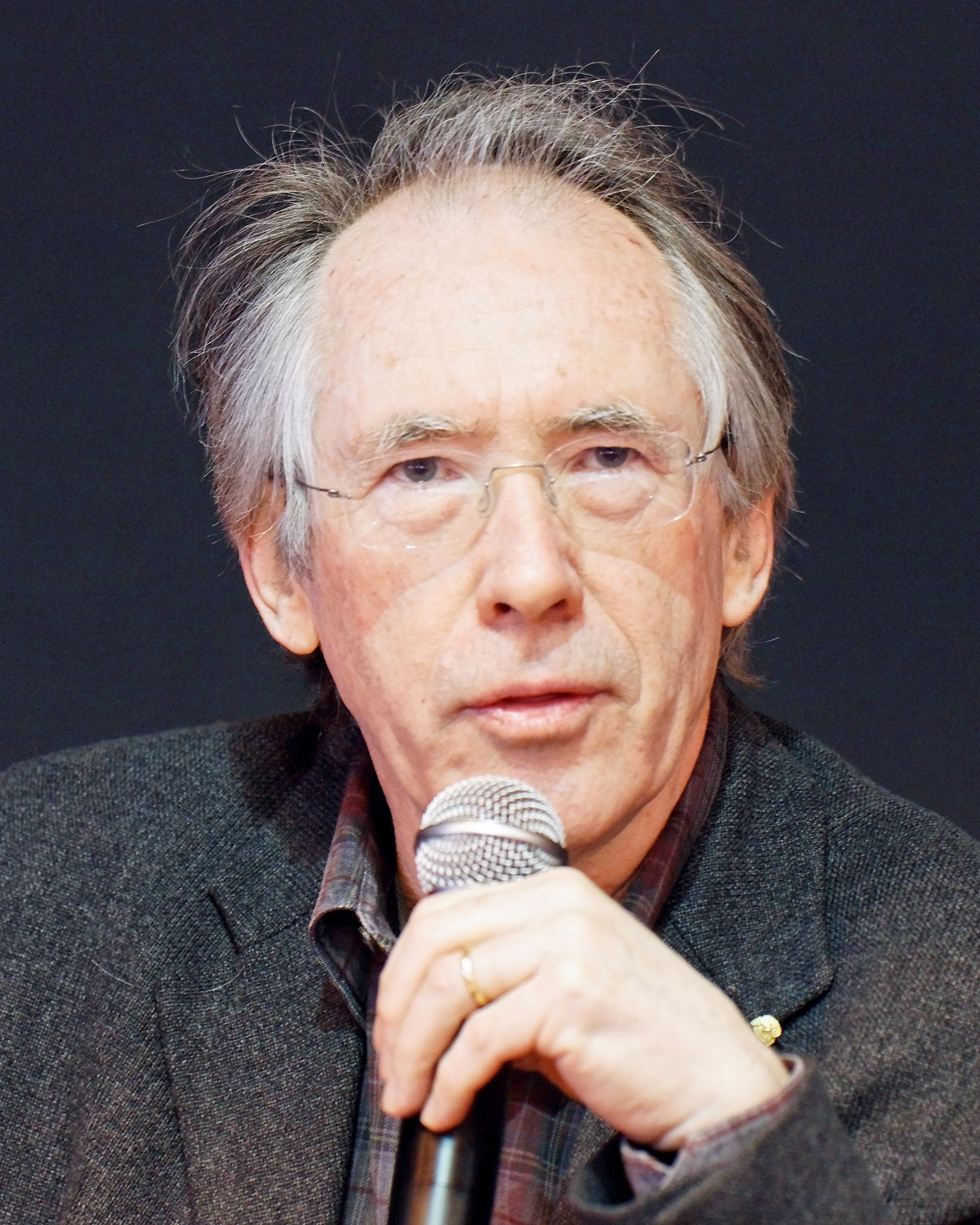
Ian McEwan, whose archives are housed at the Harry Ransom Center

Harry Ransom founded the Humanities Research Center in 1957 with the ambition of expanding the rare books and manuscript holdings of the University of Texas. He acquired the Edward Alexander Parsons Collection, the T. Edward Hanley Collection, and the Norman Bel Geddes Collection.

Ransom was the official director of the center for only three years, from 1958 to 1961, but he directed and presided over a period of great expansion in the collections until he resigned as chancellor of the University of Texas System in 1971. The center moved into its current building in 1972.

F. Warren Roberts was the official director from 1961 to 1976. He acquired the Helmut Gernsheim collection of photographs and the archives of authors D. H. Lawrence, John Steinbeck, and Evelyn Waugh, and in 1968 the Carlton Lake Collection.

After Roberts's tenure, John Payne and then Carlton Lake served as interim directors from 1976 to 1980. In 1978, the center acquired its complete copy of the Gutenberg Bible.

In 1980, the center hired Decherd Turner as director. Turner acquired the Giorgio Uzielli Collection of Aldine editions, the Anne Sexton archive, the Robert Lee Wolff Collection of 19th-century fiction, the Pforzheimer Collection, the David O. Selznick archive, the Gloria Swanson archive, and the Ernest Lehman Collection. Upon Decherd Turner's retirement in 1988, Thomas F. Staley became director of the center.

Staley acquired the Woodward and Bernstein Watergate Papers, a copy of the Plantin Polyglot Bible, and more than 100 literary archives.

In September 2013, Stephen Enniss, former head librarian of the Folger Shakespeare Library, was appointed director of the Ransom Center. Under Enniss, the Ransom Center continued to collect archives, including those of Kazuo Ishiguro, Arthur Miller, and Ian McEwan.

In 1983, the institution's name was changed from the Humanities Research Center to the Harry Ransom Center.

== Collections ==
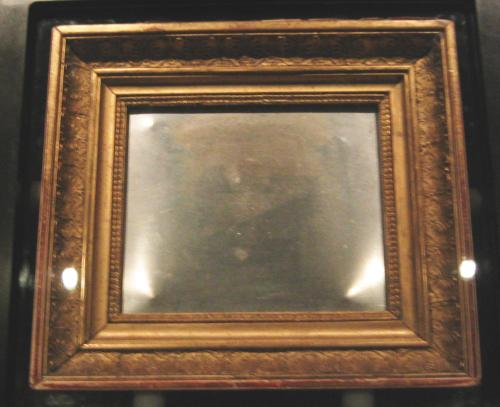
Nicéphore Niépce's View from the Window at Le Gras, 1827, on permanent display in Harry Ransom Center's main lobby

Two prominent items in the Ransom Center's collections are a Gutenberg Bible, one of 21 complete copies known to exist, and Nicéphore Niépce's 1827 View from the Window at Le Gras, the first successful permanent photograph from nature. Both of these objects are on permanent display in the main lobby.

The center also houses many culturally important documents and artifacts. Particular strengths include modern literature, performing arts, and photography. Besides the Gutenberg Bible and the photograph, notable holdings include:

=== Literature ===
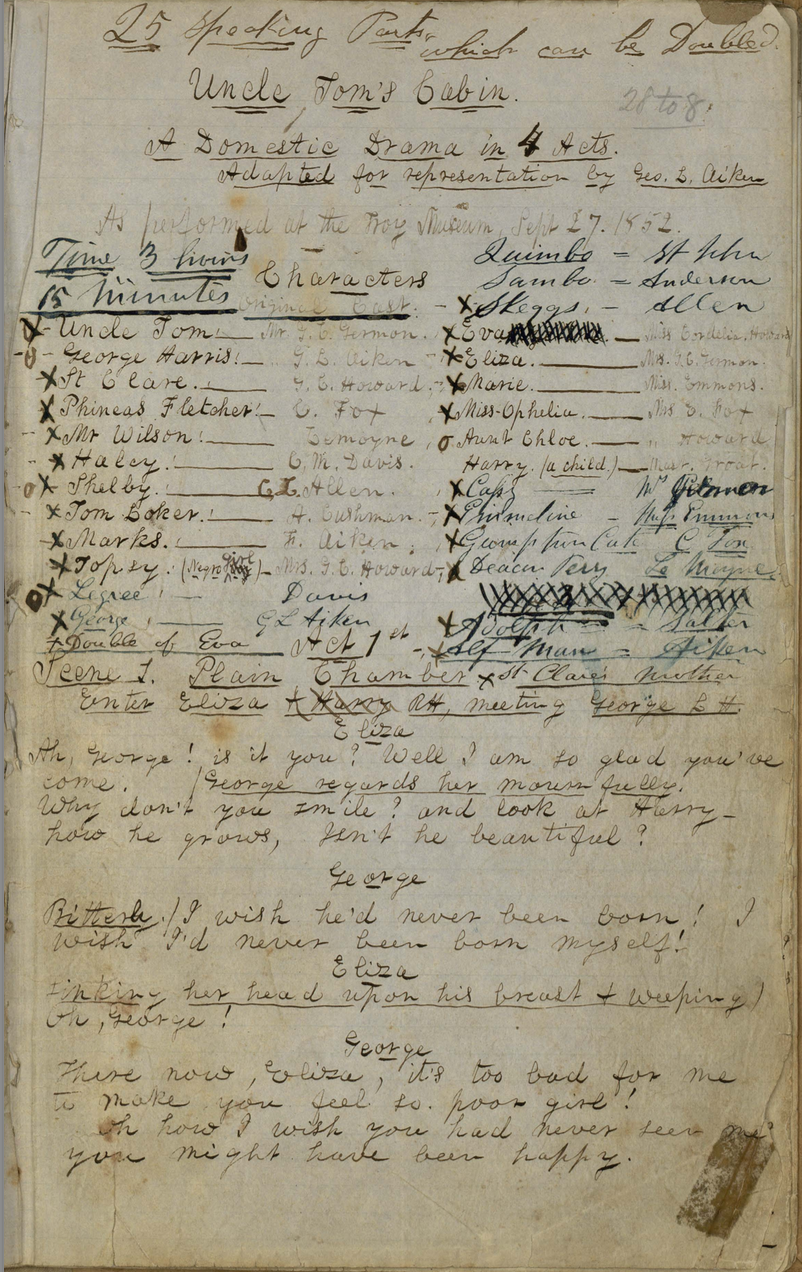
George L. Aiken's original manuscript for his stage adaptation of Uncle Tom's Cabin, published in 1852 from the George C. Howard and Family Collection at the Harry Ransom Center

- Three copies of the 1623 First Folio of William Shakespeare's plays
- A suppressed 1865 first edition of Alice's Adventures in Wonderland, one of only 23 copies known to exist
- The first edition of the 1572 Portuguese book Os Lusíadas, by Luis de Camões
- The personal libraries of writers such as Gabriel García Márquez, Alice Corbin Henderson, Ezra Pound, Evelyn Waugh, David Foster Wallace, and the Coleridge family
- Extensive manuscript collections of George Atherton Aitken, Julia Alvarez, Julian Barnes, Marthe Bibesco, Elizabeth Bowen, T. C. Boyle, Lewis Carroll, J. M. Coetzee, Billy Collins, Aleister Crowley, Don DeLillo, Gabriel García Márquez, Erle Stanley Gardner, Graham Greene, Kazuo Ishiguro, James Joyce, Pamela Hansford Johnson, D. H. Lawrence, T. E. Lawrence, Doris Lessing, Norman Mailer, Carson McCullers, Ian McEwan, McSweeney's, Brian Moore, Anne Sexton, David Foster Wallace, and T.H. White
- Edgar Allan Poe's writing desk
- A large collection of rare and valuable comic books
- A writing journal kept by Jack Kerouac in preparation for writing On the Road (1957)
- The Cardigan manuscript of Chaucer's Canterbury Tales
- A rare 1904 first edition of The Book of the Law (Liber AL) by Aleister Crowley (among other original Crowley first editions), also known as the Vellum books but more popularly known as the Holy Book of Thelema
- Tarot cards hand-colored by Aleister Crowley
- The Thomas James Wise collection of bibliographies and catalogs created by Wise and miscellaneous manuscripts and correspondence relating to Wise's forgeries and life.
- The records of the Alfred A. Knopf, a publishing company

=== Theatre and performing arts ===
- The papers of Stella Adler, Frith Banbury, Sebastian Barry, Samuel Beckett, Paul Bowles, Richard Buckle, Edward Gordon Craig, T. S. Eliot, Harry Frazee, Spalding Gray, David Hare, Lillian Hellman, Harry Houdini, Anne Jackson, Adrienne Kennedy, David Mamet, Terrence McNally, Arthur Miller, John Osborne, Peter O'Toole, J. B. Priestley, James Purdy, James Roose-Evans, George Bernard Shaw, Sam Shepard, Tom Stoppard, Jule Styne, Laurette Taylor, Eli Wallach, Jerome Weidman, Arnold Wesker, Tennessee Williams, Sandy Wilson, Audrey Wood, and many others.
- The organizational archives of B. J. Simmons & Company, Theatre Guild, and the College of Fellows of the American Theatre.
- An extensive library of early modern plays and theatrical books including three Shakespeare First Folios and one of only three known copies of the 1594 quarto of the True Tragedie of Richard the Third published by an anonymous writer.
- A historic collection of 19th- and 20th-century portrait photography of actors and dancers, and production photography holdings including Joseph Abeles and Leo Friedman, Fred Fehl, and Bob Golby.
- Design archives of Norman Bel Geddes, Gordon Conway, Eldon Elder, and Boris Aronson.
- David Garrick's diary from his 1751 trip to Paris, which formerly belonged to Harry Houdini.
- John Wilkes Booth's personal production promptbook for Richard III.
- Original costumes from the Ballets Russes including pieces from Narcisse and The Rite of Spring. Design holdings include two of Pablo Picasso's costume designs and a set design from The Three-Cornered Hat.
- The original manuscripts for George Aiken's 1852 stage adaptation of Uncle Tom's Cabin and the archive of its producing company, George C. Howard.
- A 1730 manuscript of George Frideric Handel's Coronation Anthems made by his principal copyist.

=== Film and television ===
- The papers of Jay Presson Allen, Lewis Allen, Robert De Niro, Edward Carrick, Nicholas Ray, Alfred Junge, Ernest Lehman, Lorne Michaels, Nicholas Ray, David O. Selznick, Gloria Swanson, and King Vidor
- Selected costumes, script drafts, storyboards, and audition media from Gone with the Wind. These are part of the David O. Selznick Collection
- Unused props designed by Salvador Dalí to have been used in the dream sequence in the 1945 film Spellbound
- The sunglasses worn by Gloria Swanson in the 1950 film Sunset Boulevard
- Scripts, drafts, notes, props, costumes, digital video and research material from the American television series Mad Men

=== Art ===
- Two paintings by Frida Kahlo: Self-Portrait with Thorn Necklace and Hummingbird (1940) and Still Life (with Parrot and Fruit)
- A complete set of Pablo Picasso's 1930–1937 Vollard Suite
- A she-wolf statue carved in stone and coated with gold leaf (now worn off) by Eric Gill, creator of Gill Sans typeface
- Busts of various writers (on display in the lobby and reading room)
- Large holdings in art by writers and portraits of literary figures
- Facsimile of the 1908 piano suite Gaspard de la nuit composed by Maurice Ravel

=== History ===
- A 16th-century globe designed by Gerardus Mercator
- Kraus Map Collection, a 16th- and 17th-century cartographic collection
- An official declaration by Napoleon Bonaparte
- The love letters of the Mexican Emperor Maximilian I and his wife Carlota
- Bob Woodward and Carl Bernstein's notes, interviews, manuscripts, and other documents relating to the Watergate scandal

== Sources ==
- Max, D. T. (June 11, 2007). "Letter from Austin: Final Destination". The New Yorker.
- Pearson, Rachel (March 7, 2006). "Center offers literary sort of Ransom". The Daily Texan.
- Pearson, Rachel (March 8, 2006). "Ransom Center criticized abroad". The Daily Texan.
- Page, Caroline (October 30, 2007). "HRC holds cultural gems". The Daily Texan.
- Page, Caroline (November 15, 2007). "Ransom Center leads in conservation". The Daily Texan.
- Page, Caroline (December 4, 2007). "Literary treasure hunt". The Daily Texan.
- "Harry Ransom Center Acquires Rare Plantin Polyglot Bible". April 29, 2008. Archived from the original on May 1, 2008.
