= Carlton Lake =

American literary critic, book collector, and library administrator

Carlton Lake

Carlton Munro Lake (September 7, 1915 – May 5, 2006) was an American literary critic, book collector, and library administrator. He is most notable for having accumulated the Carlton Lake Collection of research materials in French literature, which he donated to the Harry Ransom Center of the University of Texas at Austin. Lake was the director and executive curator of the Harry Ransom Center from 1978 to 2003. The Carlton Lake Collection is widely considered to be the best collection of research materials in French literature outside of France.

== Biography ==
Carlton Lake was born in Brockton, Massachusetts, on September 7, 1915, the son of Elmer and Florence Lake. He attended Boston University, where he majored in Romance languages and literatures, graduating summa cum laude in 1936. He then did a year at Columbia University, obtaining a Master of Arts degree in 1937. During World War II he served as a lieutenant in the U.S. Marine Corps, seeing action in the Pacific theater.

In the postwar period, he became the Paris art critic for the Christian Science Monitor. He also contributed short stories and essays to other periodicals including The New Yorker and The Atlantic Monthly. He also published interviews with artists such as Matisse, Picasso, Chagall, Henry Moore, and Giacometti.

Lake lived in Paris from 1950 to 1975, during which time he assiduously collected first editions and manuscripts of modern French writers (chiefly those of the late 19th and early 20th centuries). In 1968 he donated his collection to the Humanities Research Center at the University of Texas at Austin (now the Harry Ransom Center), and in 1969 became a consultant of the HRC. In 1976 he left Paris for Austin, to become the curator of the HRC's French collection, then rose to acting director of the HRC from 1978 to 1980, and executive curator from 1980 to 2003.

His collection, acquired between 1936 and 1986, assembled about 350,000 French literary materials, including manuscripts, photographs, works of art, broadsides, galleys, musical scores, and other items. Most of this represents French writers, musicians, and artists of the late 19th and early 20th century, though included are earlier materials, such as letters from the Napoleonic era.

In 1987 he was honored with the Sir Thomas More Medal for Book Collecting, "Private Collecting for the Public Good," by the University of San Francisco Gleeson Library and the Gleeson Library Associates.

After his first marriage to Elizabeth Robson, with whom he had two sons, Carlton Lake married Alfreda LeCover in 1951, with whom he had one son. The two remained married until Lake's death in 2006.

Lake died on May 5, 2006, after a lengthy battle with Parkinson's disease.

== Selected publications ==
- Carlton Lake and Robert Maillard (eds.), A Dictionary of Modern Painting. New York: Tudor Pub. Co., 1956. (online here)
- Françoise Gilot with Carlton Lake, Life with Picasso, New York: McGraw-Hill, 1964.
- Carlton Lake, In Quest of Dalí, Putnam, NY, 1969.
- Carlton Lake, Confessions of a Literary Archaeologist, New York: New Direction Books, 1990.
