= Edward Coleman (gangster) =

New York criminal gang founder (died 1839)

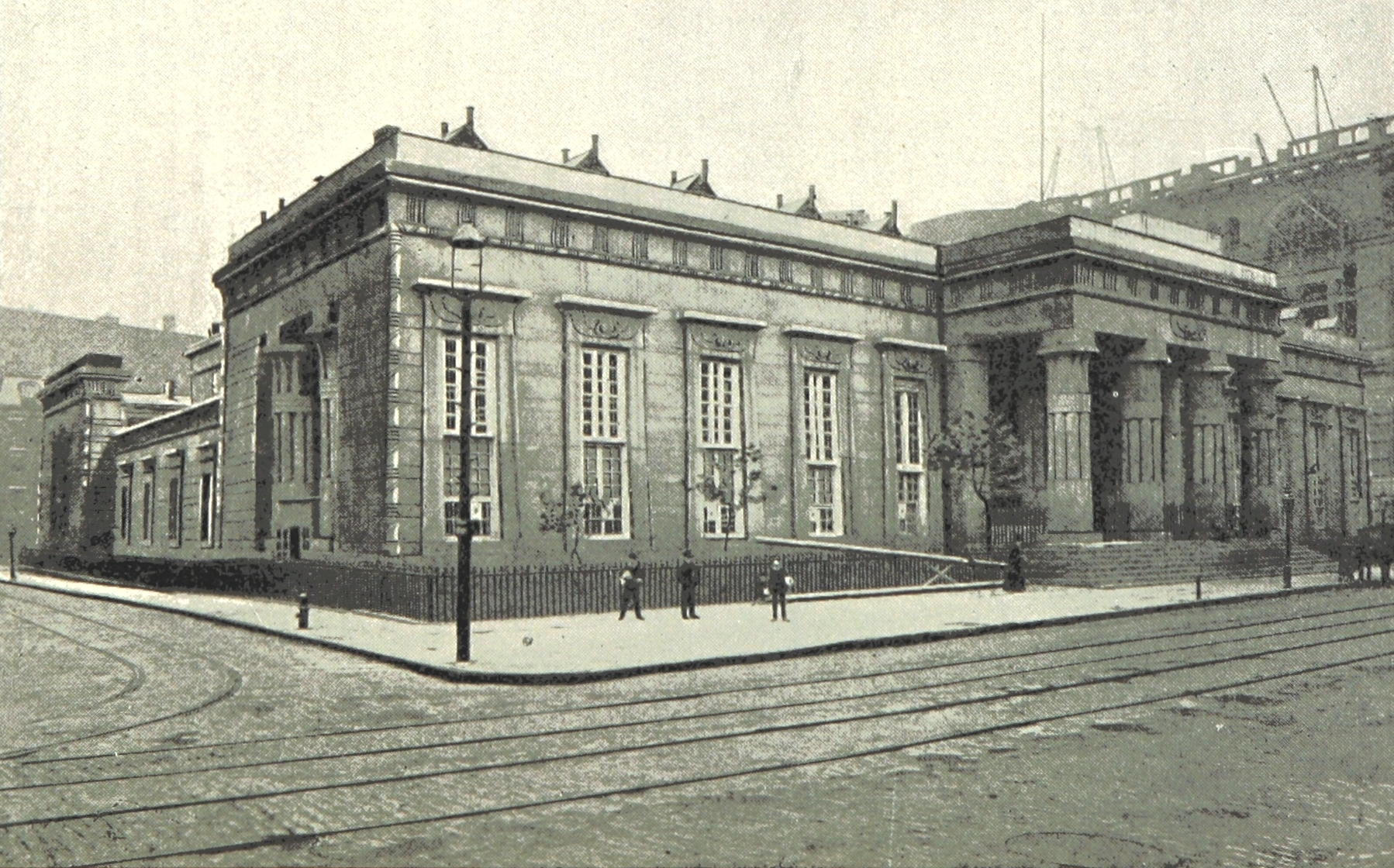
- Edward Coleman, the founding gang leader of the Forty Thieves, was the first criminal to be executed by hanging on January 12, 1839, at the newly constructed 1838 Tombs Prison in New York City
- Born: Unknown
- Died: January 12, 1839; New York City, New York
- Status: Deceased
- Conviction: Murder
- Penalty: Death by hanging

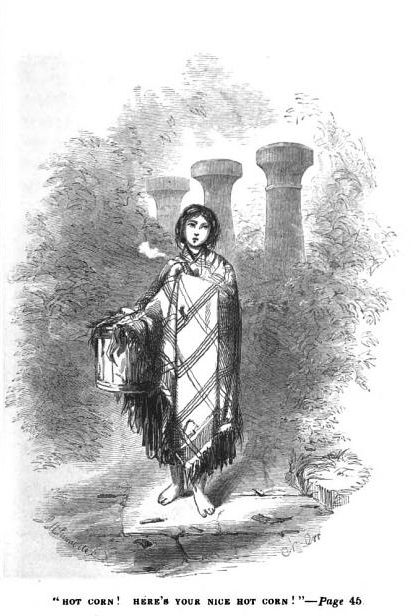
Ann the "Pretty Hot Corn Girl", the wife of New York City gangster Edward Coleman, was beaten to death by her husband who was later executed in the Tombs Prison and a book illustration of a typical 19th century "Hot Corn Girl" in the Five Points of Manhattan by John McLenan, engraved by Nathaniel Orr

Edward Coleman the New York City gangster and leader of the criminal gang the "Forty Thieves" murdered his wife who was known as "The Pretty Hot Corn Girl" in which a song was written about her after her death in 1854.

Edward Coleman (died January 12, 1839) was the founder of the Forty Thieves, alleged to be the oldest criminal gang in New York City and the first Irish gang with an established leader. He became one of New York City's most notorious villains for the murder of his wife Ann. She was a popular Five Points character and known as "The Pretty Hot Corn Girl".

An early New York gangster, Coleman was the original leader of the Forty Thieves, helping form the gang in 1826. Coleman continued to control the Five Points with the gang for over fifteen years before courting and eventually marrying a "Hot Corn Girl" named Ann in 1838. As her husband, Coleman was entitled to her earnings; however, when she did not earn as much as expected, Coleman beat her so severely she later died from her wounds. Coleman was quickly arrested and convicted of murder in early January 1839, and on January 12, 1839, Coleman became the first man to be hanged at the newly constructed Tombs Prison (built in 1838).

Although journalist and author Herbert Asbury, in his popular 1928 book The Gangs of New York, describes Edward Coleman as an early chieftain of the Forty Thieves Gang, which is implied to be a predominantly Irish gang, contemporary papers describe Coleman as a "black man." His wife, Ann, is herself described as either "colored" or "mulatto." Furthermore, the papers ascribe jealousy and infidelity as the motive for the murder, rather than anything financial, quoting Edward himself as saying he killed her "because she slept with another man." Finally, the contemporary accounts have Edward Coleman cutting his wife's throat with such ferocity that she was nearly decapitated, rather than beating her to death.

== See also ==
- Capital punishment in New York (state)
- Capital punishment in the United States
- List of people executed in New York
