= George L. Fox (clown) =

Pantomime artist

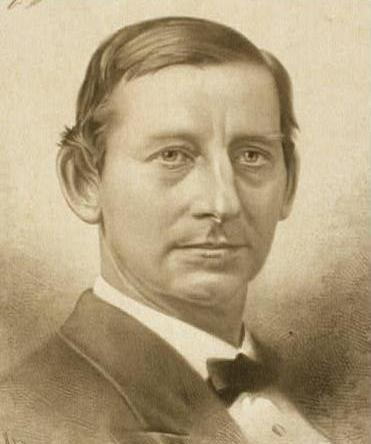
- Library of Congress
- Born: July 3, 1825; Cambridge, Massachusetts, US
- Died: October 24, 1877 (aged 52); Cambridge, Massachusetts, US
- Occupations: Comedian and Pantomime Artist
- Writing career
- Years active: 1830–1877

George Washington Lafayette Fox (July 3, 1825 – October 24, 1877) was an American actor and dancer who became known for his pantomime Clown roles, and who based the characterizations for these roles on his inspiration Joseph Grimaldi.

== Early years ==
Fox was born George Washington Lafayette Fox, the first child of George Howe and Emily (née Watt) Fox of Cambridge, Massachusetts. His parents were stock players at Boston's Tremont Street Theatre, where Laff (his childhood nickname) and his five siblings were often called upon to play juvenile roles. Fox made his debut at the Tremont Street Theatre at the age of five, though in later years his younger brothers, Charles and James, and his sister Caroline were considered the more talented. James and Caroline became popular in the Boston area as a child act and flourished for a number of years. Fox's parents decided his future would be better served if he learned a trade and they enrolled him in an apprenticeship with a local merchant.

Fox's brother James continued acting for several years, even while attending Harvard Law School and would later become a successful lawyer and four-term mayor of Cambridge. His sister Caroline married actor George C. Howard, a union that would leave an important mark on the history of American theater. In 1852 Howard commissioned his wife's cousin George L. Aiken to write a dramatization of Harriet Beecher Stowe's famous anti-slavery novel Uncle Tom's Cabin. The original production at Peal's Museum in Troy, New York spawned a sequel and then was merged into a six-act play that ran until the 1930s. The play had probably a greater impact than the novel by visually depicting the cruelties of slavery and was a boost to the abolitionist movement.

== Career ==
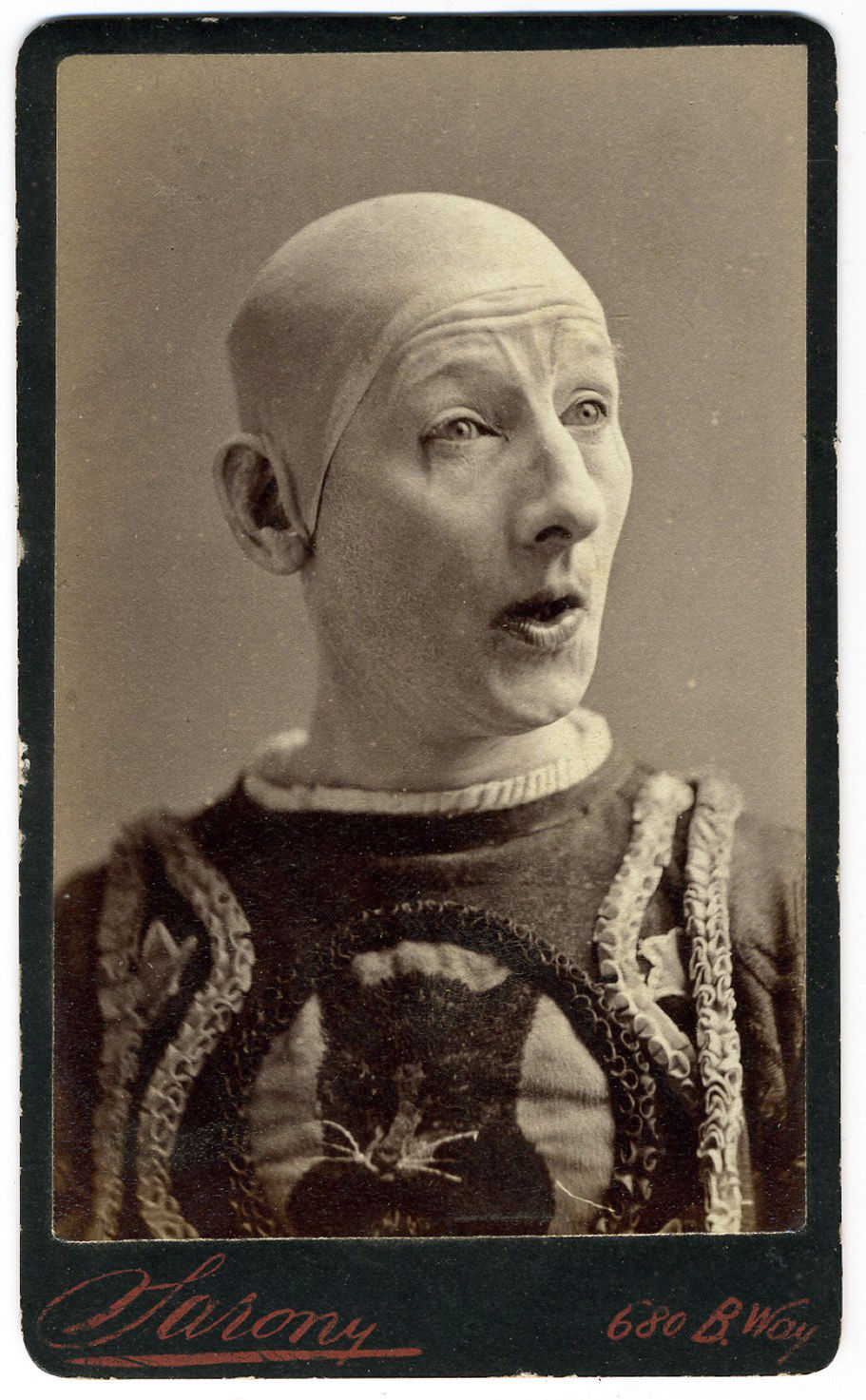
Fox as Humpty Dumpty

By the time Fox had reached the age of twenty his apprenticeship had failed, leaving him to return to the family business. He toured for a while with Howard and his sister as L. Fox, playing minor dramatic and comedic roles. He left their company in 1850 to try his hand as a low comedian at the Bowery's National Theatre on Chatham Street. There he finally found his niche, becoming a popular headliner over the following seven years. For the remainder of his career Fox would play at venues that catered primarily to working-class audiences.

In 1853, Fox directed and performed in his cousin's dramatization of Uncle Tom's Cabin at the National, starring Fox as Phineas Fletcher; his brother Charles as Gumption Cute; brother-in-law George C. Howard as Augustine St. Clair; sister Caroline as Eva St. Clair; William J. Le Moyne as Deacon Perry; and Greene C. Germon as Uncle Tom.

Inspired by the French Commedia dell'arte artists, the Ravel Brothers, to undertake the British musical genre of pantomime, he created a distinct place for that kind of entertainment in New York City, first at the National Theatre and later at the New Bowery Theatre, of which he was for a time both lessee and manager in partnership with James R. Lingard. Fox continued to surround himself with an increasingly competent group of comedians and acrobats that included his brother Charles, who had become popular as an actor and a pantomime Clown performer. Though often overlooked by the theater critics of the day, Fox's popularity in vaudeville houses at the time can be compared to that of Edwin Booth's playing Hamlet, a role that Fox played in a much lighter vein.

== Civil War ==
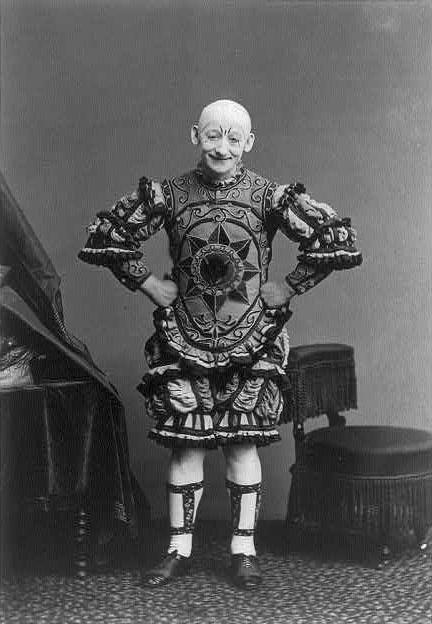
Fox on stage during the 1870s - photo by J Gurney & Son, NYC

When the American Civil War broke out, Fox enlisted as a lieutenant in the Eighth New York Infantry. He rose to the rank of major and saw action at the First Battle of Bull Run before mustering out in August 1861.

== Later years ==
When Fox returned from the war, he resumed playing pantomime roles to Lower East Side audiences. Fire forced him out of the New Bowery Theatre, one of many that would curse the building over the years. Poor business had caused a schism with Lingard that would later spill over into the court dockets. In 1866, Fox became stage manager at the Olympic Theatre on the East side of Broadway near Houston Street. There he played Bottom in A Midsummer Night's Dream and, starting in 1868, his signature role as Clown in a pantomime version that he co-wrote of Humpty Dumpty, the first American pantomime to be performed in two acts, which some feel has never been equaled since.

Over the last decade of his life, Fox would encounter artistic success coupled with financial setbacks. As a manager he often ignored the bottom line when planning a new show and as a result several of his productions that were popular with the public saw little return. This problem was compounded by competition from younger artists who were performing in ever more spectacular productions each year and by an unscrupulous partner who made promises he could not honor.

== Death ==
Fox's health began to fail in 1875 after an accident on stage that broke his nose and damaged an optic nerve. Erratic behavior over the next few months that caused some concern over his sanity was soon followed by a series of strokes that eventually led to his death, aged 52. At the time of his death he was under the care of his sister and brother-in-law at their residence in Cambridge. Fox's daughter, Louisa A. Fox, later married Daniel Sully, a stage actor who was a circus performer in youth.

== Tribute ==
Bill Irwin paid tribute to George L. Fox by creating the stage show Mr. Fox: A Rumination, which premiered in 2004 at the Signature Theatre.

== See also ==
- Dan Rice
