= Forty Thieves (New York gang) =

Irish gang formed in the early 19th century in New York City

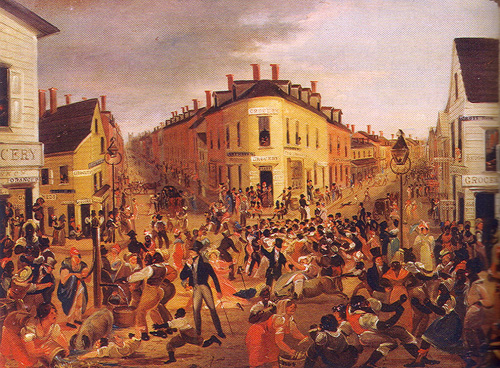
- George Catlin painting of the Five Points, Manhattan, New York City in 1827 the slum territory of the "Forty Thieves" and the other Irish criminal gangs
- Founded by: Edward Coleman
- Founding location: Centre Street, Manhattan, New York City
- Years active: 1825-1860s
- Territory: Lower East Side, Manhattan, New York City
- Ethnicity: Irish
- Membership (est.): ?
- Criminal activities: Street fighting, knife fighting, assault, murder, robbery
- Allies: Chichesters, Shirt Tails, Kerryonians, Dead Rabbits, Tammany Hall
- Rivals: Bowery Boys, Roach Guards

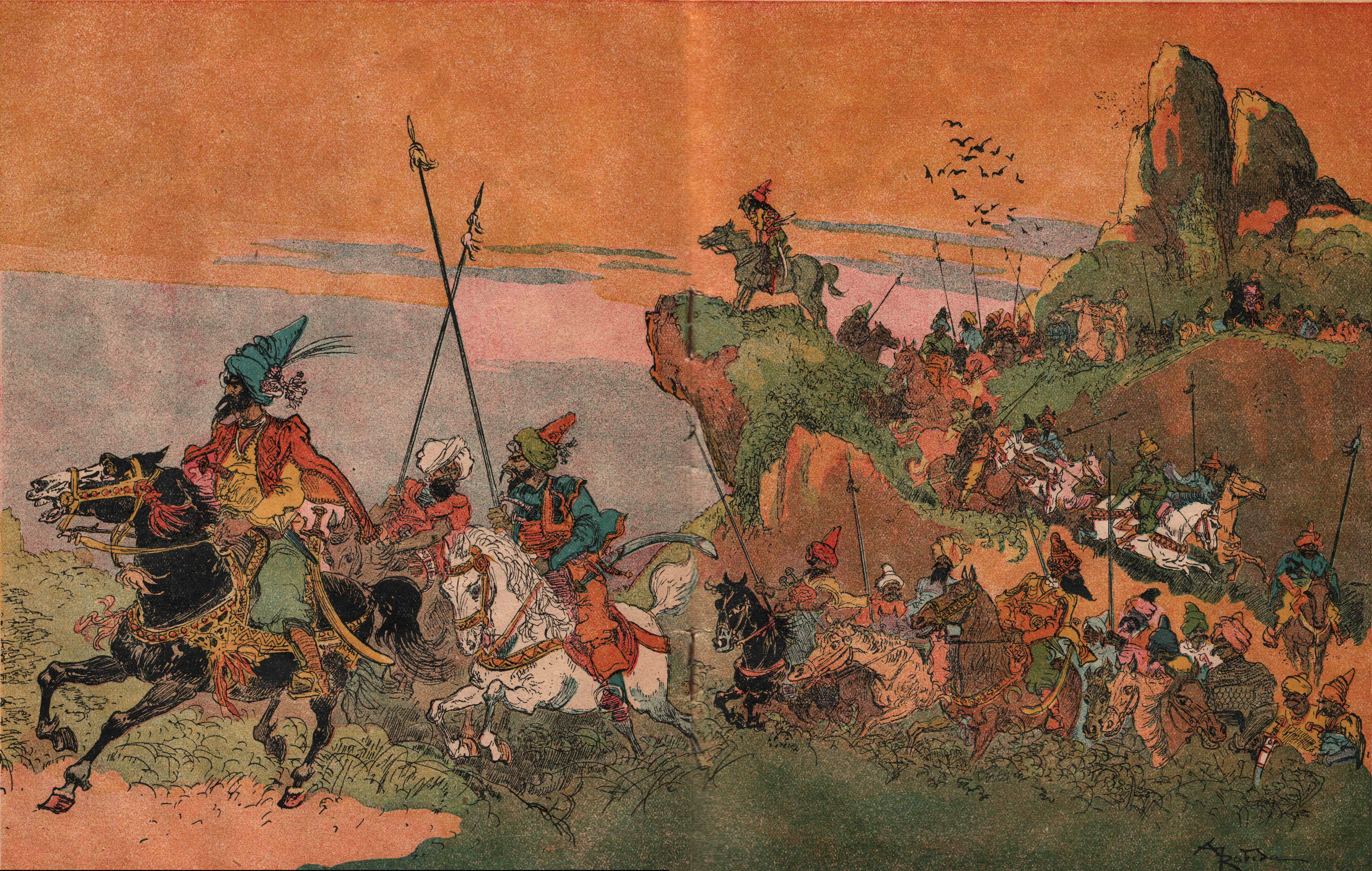
Ali Baba and the Forty Thieves were the namesakes of this notorious 19th century New York City criminal gang

The Forty Thieves — likely named after Ali Baba and the Forty Thieves — were formed in 1825 and alleged to be the first known and oldest New York City criminal street gang. The Thieves consisted primarily of Irish immigrants and Irish Americans who terrorized the Five Points neighborhood of 19th century Manhattan. Another criminal gang named the "Forty Thieves" which had no criminal ties to the New York gang was formed in London, England in 1828.

From 1873-1950s, an all-female London criminal gang known as the "Forty Elephants" was also known to use the name the Forty Thieves. Later, a criminal gang in Philadelphia called themselves the Forty Thieves. The Kerryonians, another early Irish gang formed in the same year as the Forty Thieves, have been alleged to be the second oldest organized criminal gang in New York City.

== Gang history ==
Originally based in New York's Lower East Side, the Forty Thieves were formed in 1825 by Edward Coleman. Initially it was formed to rebel against their low social status but the members soon turned to crime to relieve their frustration. This gang emerged due to prejudice and class distinction. Such social conditions were evident in the Five Points area of New York in the 1820s. Canal Street, the Bowery, Broadway, and Mulberry Street bordered this area, which was a slum infested with mosquitoes and disease.

The Forty Thieves met at a Centre Street grocery store owned by Rosanna Peers, a notorious fence of stolen goods who also sold illegal alcohol in an underground speakeasy. At Peers' grocery gang members would be given assignments and issued strict quotas on the gang's share of illegal activities. The quota system proved a great motivator among veterans competing against younger members seeking to take older members' positions. However, in the long term the gang was unable to maintain internal discipline in early New York, and by 1850 the gang had dissolved with its members joining larger gangs or leaving on their own.

From the violence to the high crime rates, Five Points desperately lacked the aid of government support. The Forty Thieves saw this as an economic opportunity, as they established relations with Tammany Hall. This corrupt bureaucracy provided community services in exchange for money and support from its residents to fund their corrupt agendas. The juvenile Little Forty Thieves, an apprentice street gang of the original Forty Thieves, would outlast their mentors, continuing to commit illegal activities throughout the 1850s before eventually joining the later street gangs following the American Civil War in 1865.

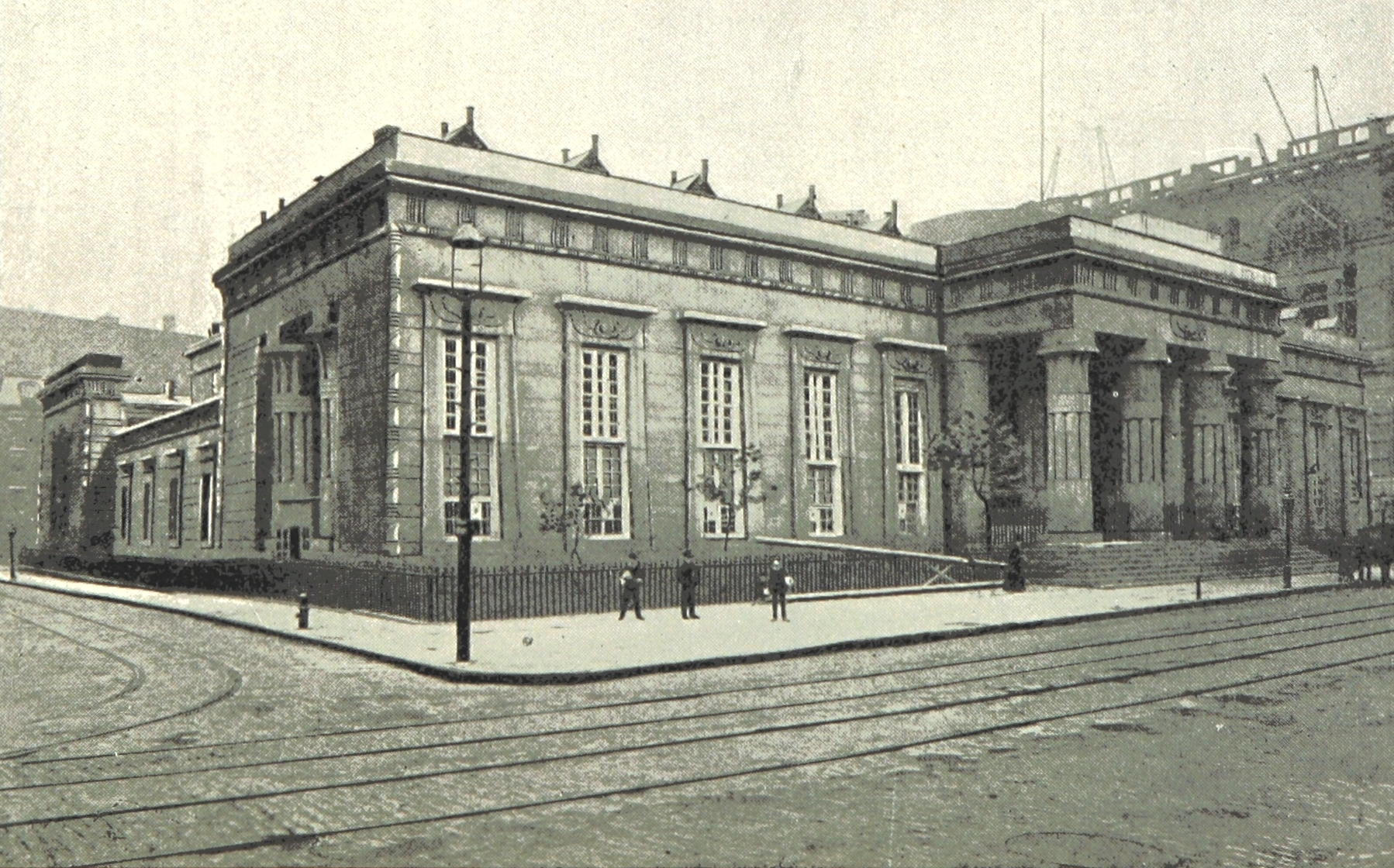
Edward Coleman the founding gang leader of the Forty Thieves was the first criminal to be executed at the newly constructed 1838 Tombs Prison in New York City

== In popular culture ==
- Gangs of New York (2002 film)
- St. Jimmy (2004 Song by Greenday)
