= Kit, the Arkansas Traveler =

1868 stage play by Francis S. Chanfrau

Kit, the Arkansas Traveler or Kit, the Arkansas Traveller (or, in its initial version, Down the Mississippi) is a stage play written in 1868 (and later reworked) for the American actor Francis S. Chanfrau. It is one of the landmarks of that century's American genre of border drama.

== Creation ==
Chanfrau conceived a drama to star himself, and in 1868, he paid $300 to Edward Spencer, generally understood to have been for fulfilling (under the title Down the Mississippi) Chanfrau's commissioning of such a work. Thomas B. DeWalden did further work on the play, and it opened in Buffalo, N.Y. in the first third of 1869. (By that time it had the title that names the lead character, offering the publicity benefit of evoking the decades-old fiddle tune "The Arkansas Traveler" and a dialogue of the same sort that had generally been associated with the tune; both of those are indeed features of the version that would be taken to New York City.) It was poorly received, however, and Chanfrau prevailed on his friend, theatrical entrepreneur Clifton W. Trayleure, to make further revisions.

The New York opening in May 1871, giving author credit to Spencer and DeWalden, was successful, and he logged some 300 performances across the country, generally crediting either Spencer alone, or Spencer and Trayleure jointly.

== Plot ==
In the drama, Chanfrau played the hero Kit Redding. His wife and daughter are kidnapped by the villain, a frontier outlaw, in a prologue, or First Act. Between acts, years pass (depending on the performance, 12 years, 20, or perhaps other intervals), including the Civil War, and Kit mourns but grows rich.

In the four remaining acts, he

- encounters the renamed villain in a hotel, but fails to recognize him;
- foils the villain's attempt to cheat him at poker aboard a river steamer;
- is recognized by the daughter (who makes him aware of the wife's death and the villain's former identity) and fights the villain on the steamer's deck; and
- pursues the villain ashore, kills him, and is reunited with the daughter.
