= Solon Robinson =

American agriculturalist

- Born: October 21, 1803; Tolland, Connecticut
- Died: November 3, 1880 (aged 77); Jacksonville, Florida
- Occupations: writer, journalist, agriculturist, and pioneer
- Known for: settling in Crown Point, Indiana on October 31, 1834

Solon Robinson (October 21, 1803 – November 3, 1880) was a writer, journalist, agriculturist, and pioneer. He wrote for the New York Tribune and American Agriculturist and published several books including Hot Corn, a bestseller.

Robinson was from Connecticut and settled in Crown Point, Indiana with his family. He formed a squatters union.

He was an agriculturist.

Robinson was one of the prominent reporters at Horace Greeley's New York Tribune. He joined the paper in 1852. Robinson wrote about Florida during the Reconstruction Era convention writing the 1868 Florida Constitution. In 1868, due to poor health, he semi-retired to Jacksonville, Florida. Robinson helped the paper gain popularity in the West and South.

== Bibliography ==
- Hot Corn: Life Scenes in New York Illustrated Dewitt & Davenport 1854, a collection of his articles on personal experiences in the underbelly of New York City
- Mewonitoc; A Story of Western Life, Indian and Domestic, a novel serialized in the Weekly Tribune, 1867
- A Northern Farmer on Southern Agriculture, a serial in the Weekly Tribune
