= Daniel Sully =

American dramatist (1855–1910)

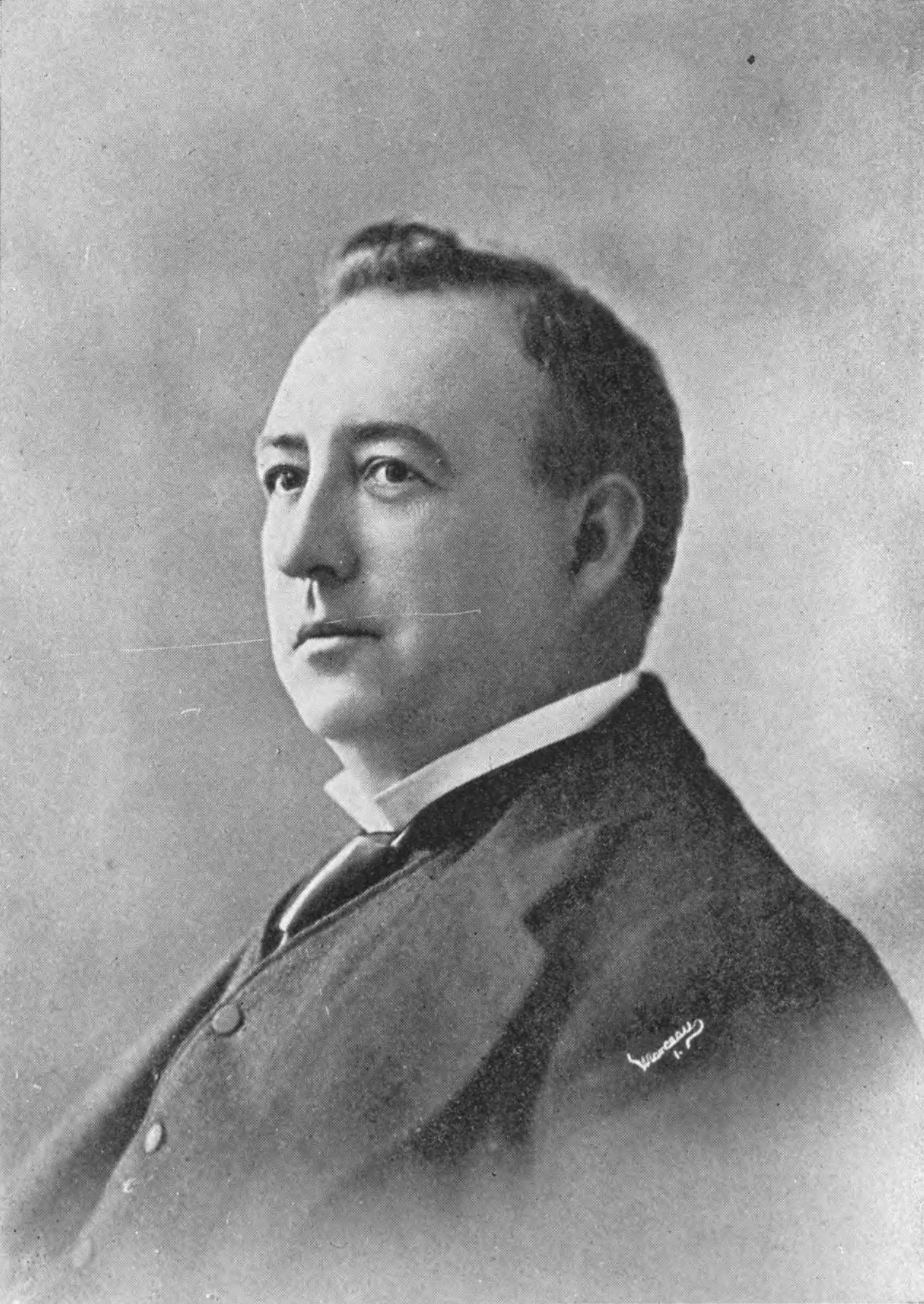
- Born: September 6, 1855; Providence, Rhode Island, U.S.
- Died: June 25, 1910 (aged 54); Woodstock, New York, U.S.
- Occupations: Circus Performer, Actor and Playwright
- Writing career
- Years active: 1890–1908

Daniel Sully (née Daniel Sullivan; September 6, 1855 – June 25, 1910) was an American circus performer, stage actor and playwright, who gained popularity during the latter years of the nineteenth century.

== Life and career ==
Daniel Sully was born on September 6, 1855, in Providence, Rhode Island. He began as a circus performer before moving on to the theater where he would find success as both an actor and writer. Sully was most remembered for his 1884 play, The Corner Grocery, that had its genesis in Edwin Waugh's The Chimney Corner. In 1900 Sully found success with Daniel J. Hart’s play The Parish Priest, a dramatic comedy in which he played the central character, Father John Whalen. By 1902, he was associated with (John) Fitzgerald Murphy (a noted actor, playwright, and political activist of the time). During 1904, Sully was the principal actor for several of Fitzgerald Murphy's plays, namely, The Irish Statesman, a role originally played by Carroll Johnson as early as 1892 and The Old Mill Stream at the California Theatre in San Francisco on respectively 6–7 March and the 13 March of that year. He also starred in Fitzgerald's play "The Chief Justice" in Salt Lake City, Utah. Sully remained active on the legitimate stage and vaudeville until shortly before his death. Sully was a member of the Elks Lodge in Baltimore, Maryland.

Daniel Sully died on June 25, 1910, at his farm near Woodstock, New York. He was survived by his wife, Louisa A. Fox, the daughter of George Fox, a famous pantomime artist remembered for the show Humpty Dumpty.
