= Albert W. Aiken =

American actor and playwright

Albert W. Aiken (c. 1846– August 19, 1894) was an American actor and writer of plays and dime novels. He sometimes published under the pseudonym Agile Penn. He was a prolific writer of pulp fiction for Beadle and Adams.

== Life and career ==
Albert W. Aiken was born in Boston, Massachusetts in c. 1846. He was the younger brother of playwright George Aiken who was best known for his popular stage adaptation of Uncle Tom's Cabin. He was also a cousin of the famous clown George Fox. By his early 20s Albert was active as both a stage actor and playwright. His first play, The Witches of New York, was originally produced in 1869 and later revived in 1872 with Aiken starring in the second production. Other stage works penned by Aiken included The Ace of Spades (1869), The Red Mazeppa; or, The Madman of the Plains (1870), and The Heart of Gold (1870). Aiken starred in an 1871 production of the latter play mounted in Brooklyn.

Aiken reused the plot of The Witches of New York for his story "Orphan Nell, the Orange Girl" which was published in the Saturday Journal in 1870 using the pen name Agile Penne. An enlarged version of this story was published in the Saturday Journal in 1872 under the title "Royal Keene, the California Detective; or, The Witches of New York". For the publication Fireside Companion he authored the story "The Molly Maguires" (1876) which told the tale of a secret society within a Pennsylvania coal mining community. He also adapted this work for stage. From 1881-1884 he devoted himself to writing dime novels; writing several detective stories.

Albert W. Aiken died on August 19, 1894 in Keyport, New Jersey.
