= Joseph C. Foster =

Scottish-born American stage manager and playwright

Joseph C. Foster (January 31, 1804 – April 9, 1877) was a Scottish-born American stage manager and playwright.

Foster was born in Edinburgh, Scotland, and came to America in the 1830s, a clown with Cooke's Circus, appearing in productions such as Mazeppa. He also appeared with circuses in other American cities.

In 1840, William Evans Burton leased the new National Theatre in Philadelphia, and Foster assisted in the stage production of a drama called The Naiad Queen (with Charlotte Cushman playing the queen) arranging the scenes and special effects. The National Theatre also produced a number of Foster's own creations, including two where he played the role of Napoleon. In 1841, he moved to the Walnut Street Theatre. He later managed other Philadelphia theatres, as well as New York theatres including the Chatham Theatre.

Foster's Seven Dwarfs played the Bowery Theatre in New York to success in 1869. In 1870, his Twelve Temptations, which was created in the vein of The Black Crook with a story from the Walpurgis Night legend, ran for over 150 performances at the Grand Opera House.

Foster died in New York in April 1877.
