= Joseph Andoh Foster =

Ghanaian politician

Foster Joseph Andoh (born 18 August 1961) is the member of parliament of Hemang Lower Denkyira in the Central region of Ghana.

== Personal life ==
Foster is married with three children. He is a Christian (Assemblies of God Church).

== Early life and education ==
Foster was born on 18 August 1961 in Twifo-Hemang in Central region. He had his BA in management in UCC in 2009. He had Diploma from Ghana Institute of Journalism in 1988–1990, He had his Post-Sec Cert 'A' in 1976–1981.

== Politics ==
Foster is member of National Democratic Congress.

== Employment ==
He was an International Diplomat. He was the District Chief Executive from 2009 to 2012. He was the Sales Manager of Pasica Ghana Limited from 1991 to 2008. He is a Marketer/Manager.
