= Henrietta Baker Chanfrau =

American actress

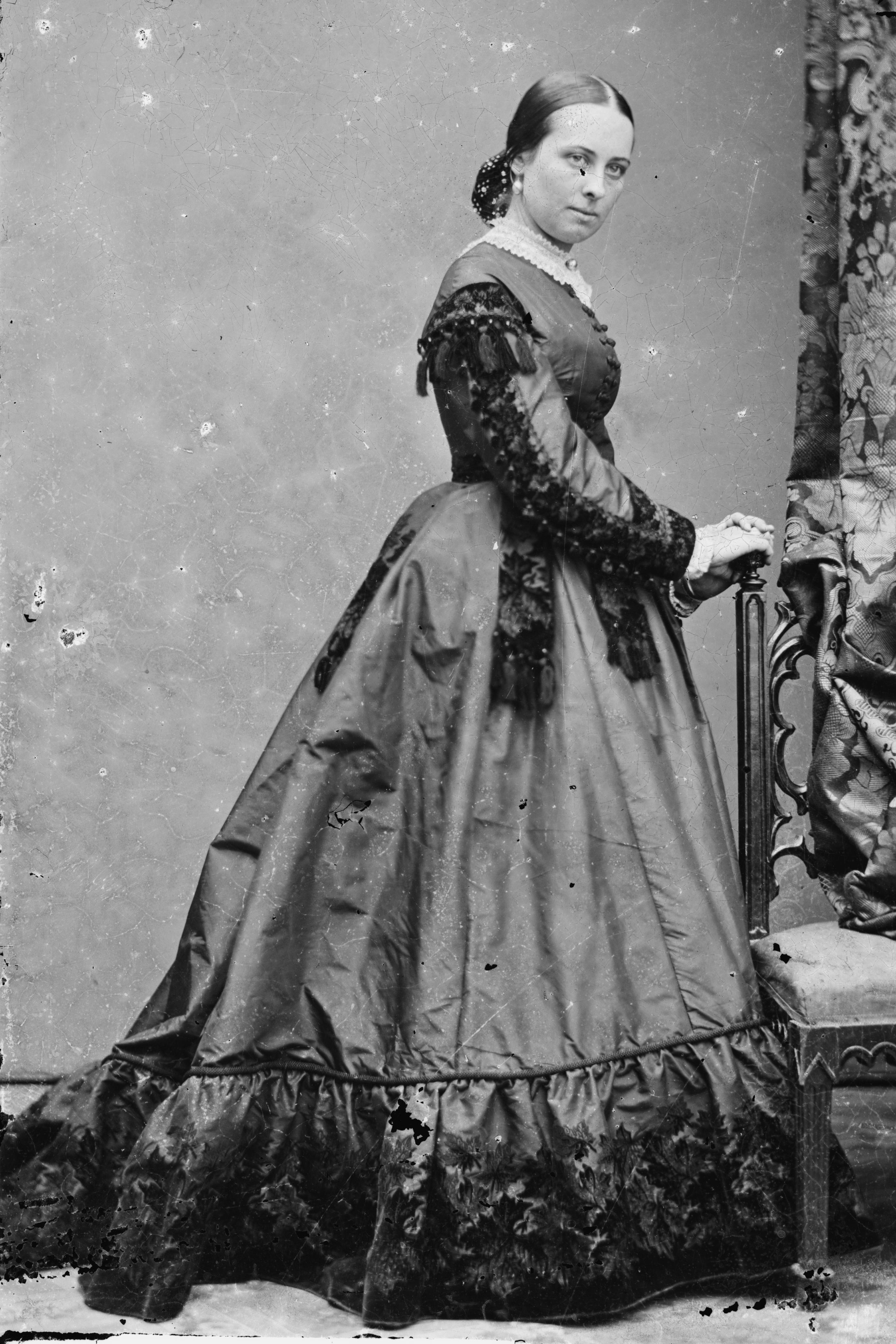
- Chanfrau, between 1855 and 1865.
- Born: Henrietta Baker; 1837; Philadelphia, Pennsylvania, United States
- Died: 1909 (aged 71–72); New Jersey, United States
- Other names: Jeannette Davis; Henrietta Baker; Mrs. F. S. Chanfrau
- Occupation: Actress
- Spouse: Frank Chanfrau (1858–1884; his death)

Henrietta Baker Chanfrau, also known as Mrs. F. S. Chanfrau, (born Jeannette Davis, 1837–1909) was an American stage actress and vocalist active from 1854 into the 1880s. A critically lauded dramatic actress, she was married to the popular comedian Frank Chanfrau. While the couple rarely performed together, they were successful in promoting each other's careers through appearances together at public benefits. Henrietta leveraged her critical acumen to lend legitimacy to the low brow entertainments of her husband, and Frank used his fame and popularity to promote his wife's performances.

== Life and career ==
Jeannette Davis was born in Philadelphia, Pennsylvania, United States in 1837. At sixteen years old she adopted the stage name Henrietta Baker at the time of her debut as a singer in the summer of 1854 at the Assembly Buildings in Philadelphia under the management of Professor Mueller. Her stage debut as an actress was as Miss Apsley in The Willow Copse on September 9, 1854. This performance was given at City Museum; a then new institution which had opened at 415-417 Callowhill Street in Philadelphia earlier that year. The bottom floor was a natural history museum, and the second floor a theater.

A short time afterward she became a member of the Arch Street Theatre. After two seasons, she left to become a leading actress at the Walnut Street Theatre. She stayed there until the 1857–58 season when she became a founding member of the company in residence at the newly built National Theatre in Cincinnati, Ohio. It was opened by Lewis Baker. While working with this theatre company she also performed with actor Frank Chanfrau in his theatre troupe. She married Chanfrau on June 23, 1858. The following August she made her New York City debut with Chanfrau's company at Wallack's Theatre.

Despite their marriage, Henrietta and Frank rarely performed together on the stage and mainly worked separately; often appearing in completely different locations at the same time. Henrietta had a long and successful run on Broadway as Ophelia in Hamlet in a production co-starring Edwin Booth, and later played Portia in a critically lauded Broadway production of Julius Caesar starring all three Booth brothers in 1864. She also had roles in several significant plays in their first staging in the United States, and for a time was one of the most successful actresses working on the American stage.

Scholarly opinion is divided over which actor in the Chanfrau marriage had the more significant career. Kevin Lane Dearinger asserts that Henrietta was "overshadowed" by her husband, whereas Nan Mullenneaux states that Henrietta was critically more successful than her husband. According to Mullenneaux, Henrietta was perceived as the more gifted actor in the marriage, and was afforded more opportunities in higher class theaters and worked with more significant stage actors than her husband. She further asserts, that Chanfrau's career was dismissed as low-brow comedy by the critics although he enjoyed greater popularity and fame with the general public for originating beloved comedic characters which became staples in low brow comedies.

Henrietta and Frank appear with each other in many "benefits" (public events to raise funds for various causes) in aid of each other's career. Henrietta's status as a lauded serious actress added legitimacy to her comedian husband. In turn, Frank's greater popularity with the general public aided in promoting his wife's career and helped introduce her to friendly public audiences at these events which were often given to promote future performances.

In 1884 Henrietta briefly retired from the stage when her husband died. In late 1886 she appeared at the reopening of the Fourteenth Street Theatre as Linda Colmore in The Scapegoat.

She died in Burlington, New Jersey, September 21, 1909.
