= Frank Chanfrau =

American actor and theatre manager

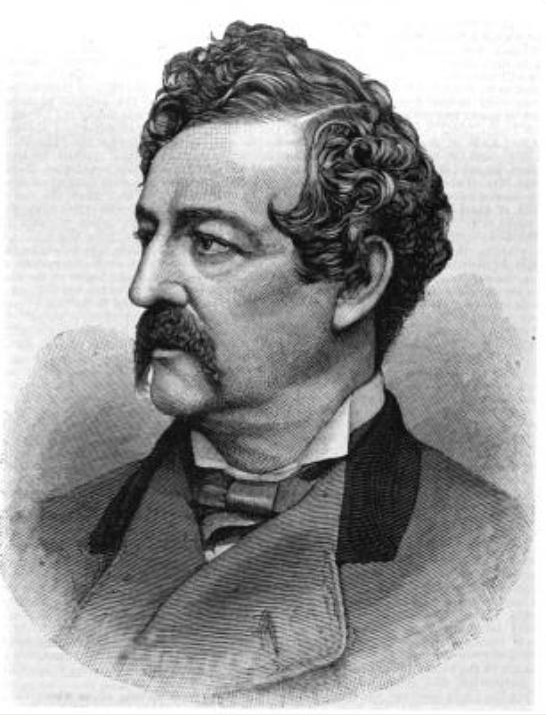
- Born: February 11, 1824; New York City, US
- Died: October 2, 1884 (aged 60); Jersey City, New Jersey, US
- Occupations: Actor; Theatre manager
- Spouse: Henrietta Baker (1858-1884; his death)

Francis S. Chanfrau (1824 – October 2, 1884) was an American actor and theatre manager in the 19th century. He began his career playing bit parts and doing impressions of star actors such as Edwin Forrest and of ethnic groups.

In 1848, he appeared as a Bowery b'hoy named Mose in A Glance at New York. The play became a record-breaking hit, due largely to the Mose character, and Chanfrau spent most of the rest of his career playing that role. In later life, Chanfrau appeared regularly in Kit, the Arkansas Traveller and Sam. His wife, Henrietta, was a well-known actress who usually performed under the name Mrs. F.S. Chanfrau.

== Early life and career ==
Chanfrau was born to French parents in New York City; he grew up near Essex Market. As a boy, Chanfrau saw a performance by Edwin Forrest and decided to become an actor himself.

Various legends arose during his career to explain his later choice of roles. One, related by T. Allston Brown, claims that in his youth Chanfrau frequented a small restaurant called the Broadway House on the corner of Grand Street, where he would order a daily plate of corned beef for six pence. One day, a printer at the New York Sun named Mose Humphrey sat down by him and yelled out his order: "Look a heah! gim me a sixpenny plate ev pork and beans, and don't stop to count dem beans, d'yr heah!" Chanfrau would later adopt this persona of the Irish Bowery b'hoy and popularize it on stage.

Another version, related by A.E. Costello, says that Chanfrau witnessed Mose Humphreys in a street brawl:

At the crisis of their little difficulty, when victory appeared somewhat uncertain on whose gladiatorial arm to perch, a handsome bright-eyed lad of twelve ran quickly out of Alvord's hat store, in which he had acted as clerk, and nimbly mounting an awning-post, shouted down to one of the combatants, who had just then pressed his antagonist backward over the tongue of 40's engine, and was pounding him very industriously, "Give it to him, Hen; Julia is looking at you from the window! Don't choke him; give him a chance to holler enough!" This nimble and encouraging youngster was Frank Chanfrau; and Mose Humphreys, who presently chorussed Frank's advice with a hearty acknowledgment of defeat, was to suggest to the then comedian in embryo a type of character which won him a double fortune and an enduring fame.

Whatever the ultimate source of his fireboy impression, Chanfrau was a gifted impersonator from a young age. He took the stage as a young man doing an impersonation of Forrest and a string of minor roles while touring from theatre to theatre with various companies. Brown says that he "played every dialect known to the stage, except the Welsh." Chanfrau became a member of the house company at Mitchell's Olympic Theatre in 1848. There, a friend and playwright, Benjamin A. Baker, wrote A Glance at New York. The play is a collection of jokes, short skits, songs, and other scenes centered on a country bumpkin from Connecticut who is guided through New York by Chanfrau's fireboy character. The two proposed it to Mitchell, the theatre manager, but he rejected it.

== Chanfrau as Mose ==
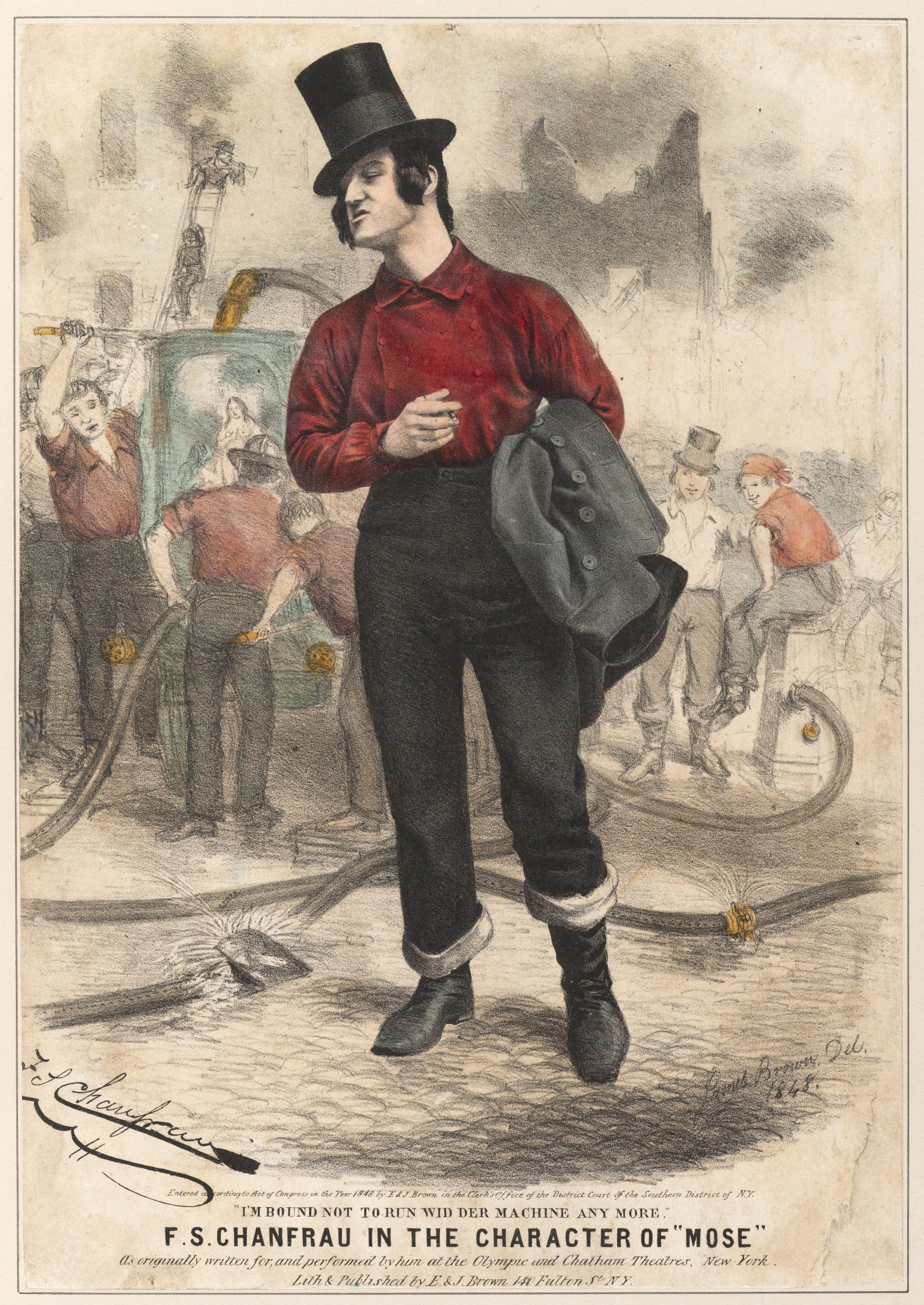
Chanfrau as Mose, 1848

In 1848, Baker had a benefit at Mitchell's Olympic and asked Chanfrau to do his part from A Glance at New York in the afterpiece. Brown relates that "Mitchell used to tell how he went on the stage that night just before the curtain was rung up, and seeing Chanfrau at the back, dressed for his part, was on the point of ordering him off, supposing he was one of the 'Centre Market loafers.'" When Chanfrau took the stage, the audience greeted him with silence.

He stood there in his red shirt, with his fire coat thrown over his arm, the stovepipe hat — better known as a "plug" — drawn down over one eye, his trousers tucked into his boots, a stump of a cigar pointing up from his lips to his eye, the soap locks plastered flat on his temples, and his jaw protruded into a half-beastly, half-human expression of contemptuous ferocity. For a moment the audience eyed him in silence; not a hand or foot gave him welcome. Taking the cigar stump from his mouth and turning half-way round to spit, he said:

"I ain't a goin' to run wid dat mercheen no more!"

Instantly there arose such a yell or recognition as had never been heard in the little house before. Pit and galleries joined in the outcry. It was renewed several times, and Mose was compelled to stand, shifting his coat from one arm to the other, and bowing and waiting. Every man, woman, and child recognized in the character all the distinctive external characteristics of the class.

The play was an immense hit, and Baker, Chanfrau, and Mitchell changed the name to New York as It Is and rewrote it to focus on Mose. It played to a full house for the next two weeks. Chanfrau's huge popularity as Mose prompted William Northall to lament that at the Olympic

the boxes no longer shone with the elite of the city; the character of the audience was entirely changed, and Mose, instead of appearing on the stage, was in the pit, the boxes, and the gallery. It was all Mose, and the respectability of the house mosed too.

W. Olgivie Ewen leased the larger Chatham Theatre for Chanfrau to manage beginning 28 February 1848. Chanfrau changed the name to Chanfrau's National Theatre and allowed working-class patrons to sit in all sections of the playhouse, not just the pit as was customary. Chanfrau acted in a number of melodramas and burlesques with a concentration on Mose plays. Meanwhile, New York as It Is broke all records for New York theatre, playing for 47 nights straight and becoming the most popular play in the United States to that point. The New York Herald reported that a performance on 26 April 1848 was so packed that the crowd rushed the stage, howling and laughing. The police and theatre staff had to remove the excess theatregoers, some of whom had to literally walk over members of the pit to get back to their seats. Chanfrau retained Chatham's lease until 8 July 1850.

For one week during 1849, Chanfrau performed A Glance at New York in two New York theatres and one in Newark every day. He performed the early evening performance at the Chatham then went to the Olympic Theatre, New York for another performance and then head nine miles to Newark in a horse and buggy for a third performance. Chanfrau began touring widely, starred as Mose at a number of working-class theatres. The Mose series expanded to include Mose in China, Mose in California, The Mystery and Miseries of New York, and many others. David Renear estimates that Chanfrau appeared as Mose at least 385 times in seven plays between 15 April 1848 and 6 July 1860. Meanwhile, other actors tried to cash in on the Mose fad, and Bowery b'hoy dramas appeared on stages across the United States.

In 1850 the illustrator, Thomas Butler Gunn, drew and designed a graphic novel call Mose Among the Britishers or The B'hoy in London featuring the popular character. Gunn dedicated the work to Chanfrau.

== Later career ==
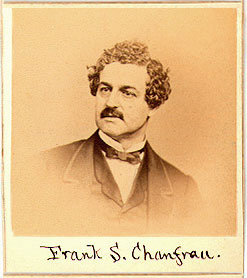
Frank Chanfrau

In the spring of 1857, Chanfrau became the manager of the Bowery Theatre (at that time known as Brougham's Bowery Theatre). By this time, the popularity of the Mose character was waning, so Chanfrau turned to other parts. He did satires of Edwin Forrest, Shakespeare, and a version of Dan Rice's circus. In late June, he moved to the theatre at 585 Broadway (previously home to Buckley's Serenaders) and renamed it the New Olympic Theatre. He played there until August, mostly concentrating on nostalgic pieces from the 1840s and early 1850s.

Chanfrau eventually had a minor hit as the title character of Kit, the Arkansas Traveller, which he played 360 times. Later he appeared in the play Sam (written by Thomas de Walden) 783 times. For the remainder of his career, he played these parts, Mose, and other roles from his early life as an actor.

Brown left this description:

Off the stage he was bluff, hearty, and earnest in manner. His method of life was simple. Careful of money, yet generous, exacting yet just, hating all sham, yet sympathizing with misfortune, and imbued with great pride in his profession, he was the best friend of the rank and file on the stage.

== Death ==
Frank Chanfrau died at Taylor's Hotel in Jersey City, New Jersey, on October 2, 1884.
