= Charles W. Taylor =

American actor and dramatist

Charles Western Taylor (c. 1800 – April 11, 1874), often billed as C. W. Taylor, was an American actor and dramatist in the mid-19th century. He is best known today for writing one of the first stage adaptations of Uncle Tom's Cabin.

== Early life ==
Taylor was born in Walsall, England, about 1800.

== Career ==
He first appeared onstage in Norfolk, Virginia, in 1819. He soon after debuted in New York in the Forest Rose. He long acted in parts at the National Theatre on Chatham Street in New York. He also acted for many years in Albany, New York, and also served as musical director of the Bowery Theatre in New York City under the direction of Thomas Hamblin.

Taylor wrote the first produced non-comedic stage adaptation of Harriet Beecher Stowe's Uncle Tom's Cabin in the United States. It debuted on 23 August 1852, with Taylor playing Uncle Tom, but only ran for 11 nights after little success. Taylor's abbreviated play omitted key characters and had a happy ending where Tom gained his freedom.

His other stage adaptations included a version of the 1854 bestseller Hot Corn.

Taylor retired from the stage in 1860. He died in West Farms, Bronx, New York City, New York, on April 11, 1874.

== Plays (partial list) ==
- The Water-Witch; or the Skimmer of the Seas (1831); adaptation of James Fenimore Cooper book; played for 18 successive performances at the Bowery Theatre in New York, a long run for its time
- The Goblet of Death; or, the Road to Ruin (c. 1847); called "a thrilling temperance drama, with a moral the author would have done better had he heeded it" in an 1880 history of theatre in Albany, New York
- Uncle Tom's Cabin (1852); adaptation
- Little Katy or, The Hot Corn Girl (1853); adaptation of Hot Corn stories
- Dred; or the Dismal Swamp (1856); adaptation of Stowe's Dred: A Tale of the Great Dismal Swamp, and a different version than the one by John Brougham
- The Drunkard's Warning (1856)
- The Lord if the Isles, or the Battle of Bannockburn (1856); adaptation of Sir Walter Scott poem The Lord of the Isles
- The Signet Ring of King Solomon
