= Decherd Turner =

American librarian

Dechard H. Turner
- Born: September 1, 1922; Pike County, Missouri
- Died: July 7, 2002 (aged 79); Austin, Texas
- Occupations: librarian and educator

Decherd H. Turner (1 September 1922, Pike County, Missouri – 7 July 2002, Austin, Texas) was an American bibliophile, ordained Presbyterian minister, director of S.M.U.'s Bridwell Library, and director of U.T.'s Harry Ransom Humanities Research Center, known for acquiring rare books, manuscripts, and other archival materials.

== Career ==
Turner grew up on a Missouri farm and earned a bachelor's degree from the University of Missouri in 1943. He studied theology at the Vanderbilt University School of Religion, earning another bachelor's degree, and then became an ordained Presbyterian minister. Turner was director of the Bridwell Library in Dallas, Texas from 1950 to 1980. As director of the Bridwell Library, he made many acquisitions and assembled what is now, thanks to his successor Valerie Hotchkiss, the American Southwest's largest collection of 15th-century books. Turner also acquired vellum copies of such rare books as the Kelmscott Chaucer, the Doves Press Bible, and the Ashendene Dante. In 1963, while continuing to serve as the Bridwell director, he became editor-in-chief of the Southwest Review. In 1980 the Harry Ransom Center hired Turner to direct the Center and its acquisitions program. Before retiring in 1988, he acquired the Uzielli Collection, the Wolff Collection of 19th-century fiction, the Pforzheimer Collection, the David O. Selznick archive, and a number of other notable collections.
