= Joseph Foster (silversmith) =

American silversmith

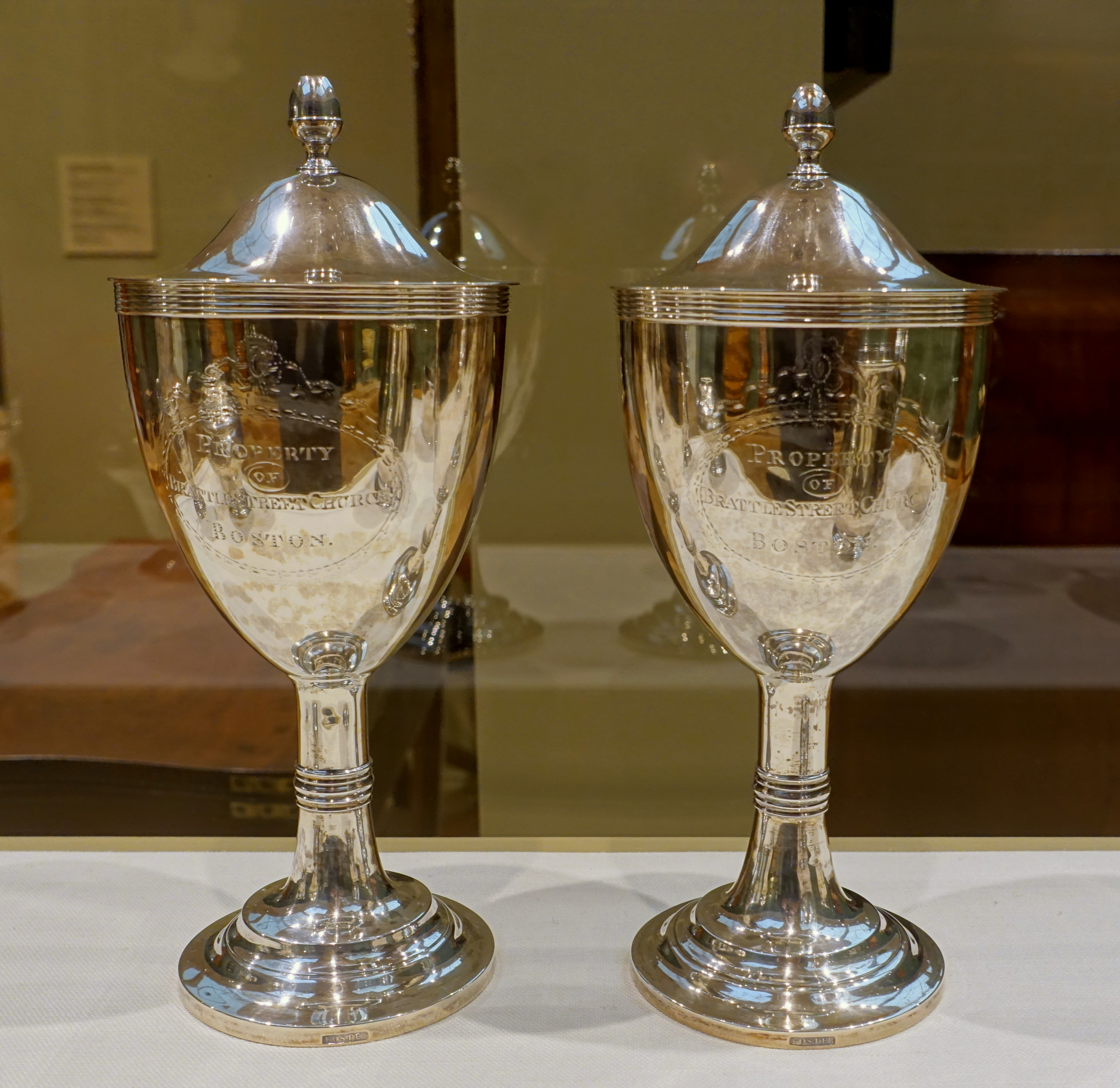
Pair of covered standing cups, Joseph Foster, Boston, c. 1790

Joseph Foster (September 10, 1759 - December 27, 1839) was an American silversmith, active in Boston.

Foster was born in either Boston or Ware, Massachusetts. From 1774 to 1781 he was apprenticed to Benjamin Burt in Boston. They remained close throughout Burt's life; Foster was sole executor of Burt's estate in 1805, and Burt's will left ". . . to my trusty friend Joseph Foster of Boston, Goldsmith one hundred dollars." He worked circa 1781-1830 as a silversmith in Boston, with a shop on Ann Street and later on Fish Street near Burt. Foster was recalled by Colonel Henry Lee in 1881 as follows: "An anxious visit of inquiry to 'honest Foster', the silversmith, who, in his long coat, knee-breeches and silver buckles, dwelt with his spinster sister in an impracticably low-jettied house, one step below the narrow sidewalk, and, as old-fashioned housekeepers believed, beat his silver to a superior whiteness".

Foster's mark appears on a considerable quantity of Boston-area church plate. His work is collected in the Metropolitan Museum of Art, Museum of Fine Arts, Boston, and Yale University Art Gallery.
