= George C. Howard =

American actor

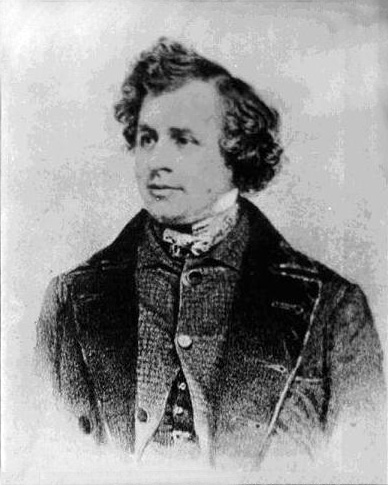
- Library of Congress
- Born: September 6, 1818; Halifax, Nova Scotia
- Died: January 18, 1887 (aged 68); Cambridge, Massachusetts, U.S.A.
- Resting place: Mount Auburn Cemetery; Cambridge, Massachusetts
- Occupations: Actor and Theater Manager
- Writing career
- Years active: 1838 - 1886

George C. Howard (1818–1887) was a Nova Scotian-born American actor and showman who is credited with staging the first theatrical production of Harriet Beecher Stowe's Uncle Tom's Cabin.

== Early life ==
George Howard Cunnabell was born on January 6, 1818, at Halifax, Nova Scotia, the son of John Henry and Mary Ann (née Nevon) Cunnabell. Howard’s father was originally a carpenter who later operated a successful tallow and ship chandler business until it was consumed in a devastating fire and his contracts with the British Navy were lost to competitors.

== Career ==
Howard’s first performances were as a choirboy at Catholic services in Halifax and later in amateur theater. He tried his hand at several trades, the last being tailoring, before leaving for Boston in 1836 to pursue an acting career. He made his professional debut in 1838 as George Cunnabell Howard at the Chestnut Street Theatre in Philadelphia, Pennsylvania, and within a few years was playing major roles at the Boston Museum (theatre). He was the first there to play Claude Melnotte in Edward Bulwer-Lytton’s The Lady of Lyons; Sir Thomas Clifford in Victor Hugo’s The Hunchback of Notre-Dame; and Romeo and Orlando in William Shakespeare’s Romeo and Juliet and As You Like It.

In the mid-1840s he formed the company, Howard and Foxes, with the Fox troupe, a family of actors from Cambridge, Massachusetts, and toured throughout the Northeast. Caroline "Caddie" Emily Fox, the talented fifteen-year-old daughter of George and Emily Fox, married Howard on October 31, 1844. At various times over the following years, her brothers George L. Fox (1), James Augustus Fox and Charles K. Fox performed with Howard.

== Uncle Tom's Cabin ==
In 1852 Howard hired Caroline's cousin George L. Aiken to adapt for the stage Harriet Beecher Stowe's anti-slavery novel Uncle Tom's Cabin. The play debuted on September 27, 1852, at Peale’s Museum in Troy, New York, with a cast largely made up of family and friends of Howard's that included his four-year-old daughter, Cordelia. The play was a great success and ran for over three months, an achievement for a small town theater.

George Howard	Augustine St. Clare
Caroline Howard.	Topsy
Cordelia Howard	Eva
George Aiken	George Harris.
Charles K. Fox	Phineas Fletcher, Gumption Cute
William J. Le Moyne	Deacon Perry
Greene C. Germon	Uncle Tom

Aiken’s original script, which ran over three hours, ended with little Eva's death, Later that year he wrote a sequel that brought the story to a proper end which he soon merged with the original script to create the six-act play known today. The following year the play opened at Alexander H. Purdy’s National Theatre in the Bowery neighborhood of lower Manhattan and was well received. The play was directed by George L. Fox, who had become a local favorite there, and retained many of the original players from the first production. Uncle Tom’s Cabin would remain in continuous production somewhere in the United States well into the 1930s, an incredible accomplishment for any time.

== Later years ==
In 1857 George C. Howard became the manager of the Troy Adelphi Theatre, but returned to the road after box office receipts did not meet expectations. In 1861 Howard filled in as manager of Fox's New Bowery Theatre, while his brother-in-law George L. Fox served in the Civil War. After the war Howard would return to the stage only on occasion.

== Death ==
George Cunnabell Howard died at his residence in Cambridge, Massachusetts, on January 18, 1887. He was survived by his wife Caroline. The Howards had eight children, of which only three survived their parents. Adelia Ann Howard was born on May 10, 1846, and died five months later on October 24. George Cunnabell Howard Jr. was born on November 9, 1849, and died February 1, 1850. John Green Howard was born on March 18, 1851, and died at age 12 on December 5, 1863. James Fox Howard was born on November 10, 1853, and died on April 7, 1855. Charles Lafayette Howard was born on May 10, 1856, and died at sea on June 12, 1884, while on a cruise to Europe.

Caroline Emily Fox Howard was born on May 10, 1829, at Boston, Massachusetts. She continued to play Topsy in various productions of Uncle Tom’s Cabin until her husband’s death in 1887. Caroline died in Cambridge on October 8, 1908.

Cordelia Howard was born on February 1, 1848, at Providence, Rhode Island and after a successful career as a child actor left the stage and married on June 23, 1871, Edmund J. MacDonald, a native of Scotland who worked for MacDonald and Sons as a bookbinder. She died on August 8, 1941, in Bourne, Massachusetts.

Arthur Lincoln Howard was born on October 20, 1865, at New York City and later became a prominent Boston lawyer after graduating from Harvard. He married Emily Stewart in 1895 and became the father of a daughter and two sons. Arthur died in 1929 on January 19 at Cambridge.

Walter Scott Howard was born on June 26, 1868, at New York City and later became an actor with Joseph Jefferson’s company before going on to play in a number of Shakespearean productions. He was a member of several New York stock companies and at one time he served as actress Ada Rehan’s manager. In 1897 Walter married actress Minnie Parker and soon became the father of a son, George P. Howard. In later life Walter passed up an opportunity to direct in Hollywood and returned to Massachusetts where wrote about current events and published children’s books and works of poetry. In the mid-1920s Walter became involved in local government and served for a number of years as chairman of selectman for the town of Bourne, Massachusetts. Walter Scott Howard died there on November 12, 1954, at the age of 86.

George P. Howard sold the family's papers to the Harry Ransom Center at the University of Texas at Austin in 1963. Among the papers are the original manuscripts for stage production of Uncle Tom's Cabin by George Aiken, playbills, scrapbooks, photographs, memoirs, and some of the Howard family script library.
