= Cordelia Howard =

American child actor (1848–1941)

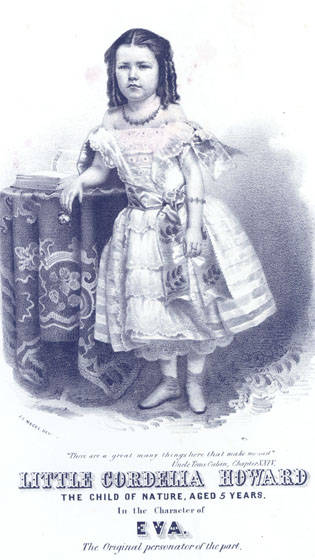
- Born: February 1, 1848; Providence
- Died: August 8, 1941; Bourne
- Occupation: Actor
- Parents: George C. Howard (father); Caroline Howard (mother)

Cordelia Howard (February 1, 1848 – August 8, 1941) was a child actress on the American stage. Her most famous role was as Little Eva in the stage adaptation of Uncle Tom's Cabin. One commentator wrote "The name of Little Cordelia has become synonymous with that of Little Eva."

Cordelia Howard was born on February 1, 1848, in Providence, Rhode Island, the daughter of actor and theatrical producer George C. Howard and actress Caroline Emily Fox Howard. Her first stage role was in 1850, as a fairy sprite in the opera The Mountain Sylph. She originated the role of Little Eva in George L. Aiken's 1852 stage adaptation of Uncle Tom's Cabin, with her mother as Topsy and her father as Augustine St. Clare. The play was immensely popular, and Howard starred in Little Eva for hundreds of performances, continuing in the role until she was a teenager. She also starred as Little Dick and Pearl in stage adaptations of Oliver Twist and The Scarlet Letter, as well as the title character in the temperance play Little Katy; or, The Hot Corn Girl.

Following her retirement from the stage around 1861 at age 13, Howard attended a boarding school in Cambridge, Massachusetts. After marrying bookbinder Edmund Jesse Macdonald in 1871, she remained a long-time resident of Cambridge, living in various homes throughout the city, including a long-term residence at 16 Kirkland Place. In 1929, she moved to 23 Oak Avenue in Belmont, Massachusetts, where she resided for the final twelve years of her life.<ref>{{cite news |title=Miss Cordelia Howard, Original 'Little Eva', Dies at 93 |newspaper=The New York Times |location=New York, NY |date=August 11, 1941}}</ref>

During her time in Belmont, Howard was regularly visited by national journalists on her February 1st birthday, during which she proudly displayed her surviving 1852 childhood theatrical memorabilia, including original stage prompt books, playbills, and commemorative textile prints.<ref>{{cite news |title=Original 'Little Eva' Celebrates 91st Birthday |newspaper=The Boston Globe |location=Boston, MA |agency=United Press |date=February 2, 1939}}</ref> While she died at her brother's home in Bourne, Massachusetts, in 1941, her primary permanent residence throughout her later decades was her home in Belmont, MA.
