= George Aiken (playwright) =

American dramatist (1830–1976)

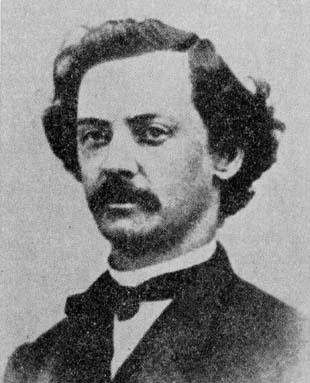
- Born: December 19, 1830; Boston, Massachusetts, US
- Died: April 27, 1876 (aged 45); Jersey City, New Jersey, US
- Resting place: Mount Auburn Cemetery; Cambridge, Massachusetts
- Occupation: Stage actor

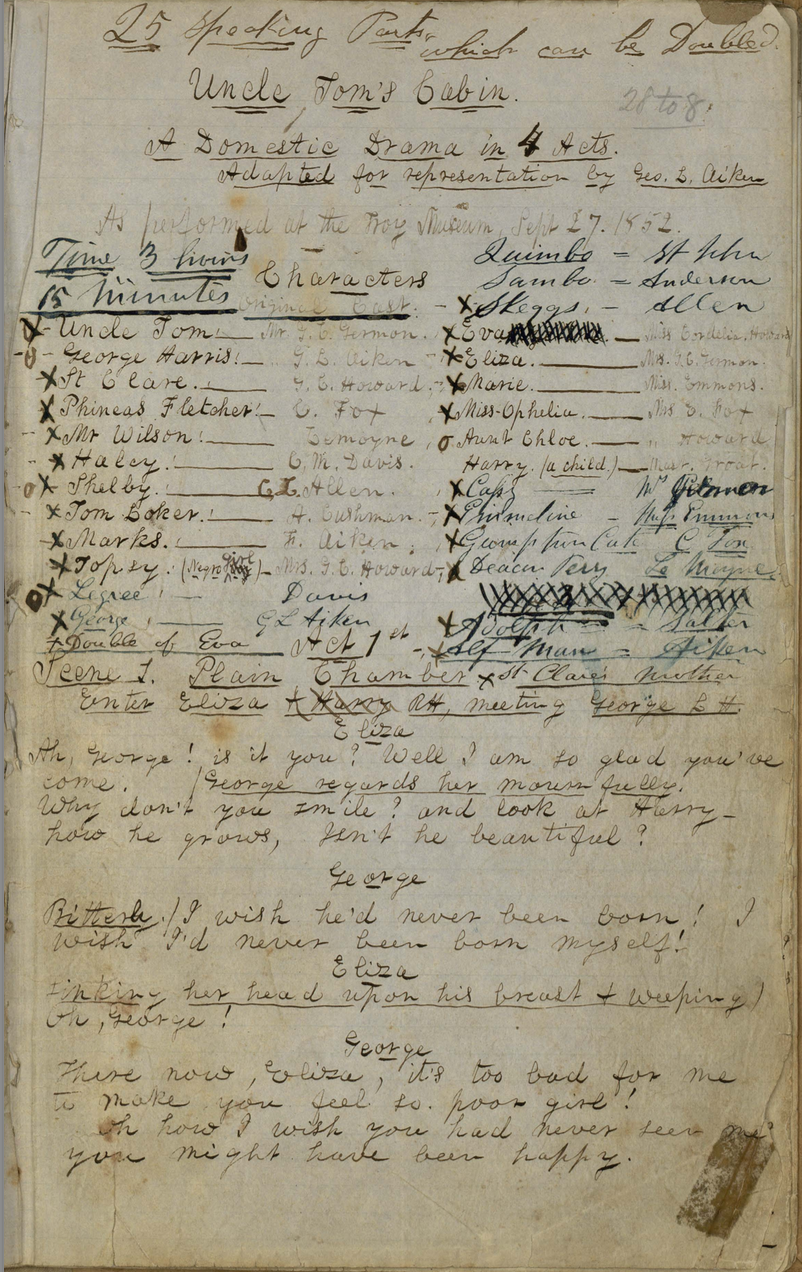
George Aiken's original manuscript for his stage adaptation of Uncle Tom's Cabin, 1852

George L. Aiken (December 19, 1830 – April 27, 1876) was an American playwright and actor best known for writing the most popular of the numerous stage adaptations of Harriet Beecher Stowe's Uncle Tom's Cabin.

== Life and career ==
George Aiken was born in Boston, Massachusetts, on December 19, 1830. He was the brother of actor and playwright Albert W. Aiken. Both he and his brother wrote dime novels for Beadle and Adams with the plots of George's work centering on the American frontier or the American stage. After the publication of several of his stories he began a career in theater; making his stage debut at the age of 18. He worked professionally as an actor in theaters in Rhode Island, New York, and Massachusetts.

In 1852 Aiken was commissioned by his cousin, the actor George C. Howard, to adapt Harriet Beecher Stowe's novel Uncle Tom's Cabin for the stage. Stowe's novel had been published earlier that same year. It was performed by Howard's company, with Aiken playing the hero George Harris. The play became a spectacular success, touring for 50 years and inspiring more than 100 knock-off adaptations by other creatives.

Aiken continued to write but never again matched the success of Uncle Tom's Cabin. His other plays include a dramatization of Ann S. Stephens's novel The Old Homestead (1856), a dramatization of Stowe's A Key to Uncle Tom's Cabin, and Josie, or Was He a Woman? (1870). He also wrote later dime novels like The Household Skeleton (1865), Chevalier, the French Jack Sheppard (1868) and A New York Boy Among the Indians (1872). He retired from acting in 1862 and then settled in Brooklyn.

Aiken's original manuscripts for Uncle Tom's Cabin were passed through the family along with other memorabilia from Howard's company. The family placed the collection at the Harry Ransom Center in 1963.
