= 1870 New York City mayoral election =

- November 8, 1870
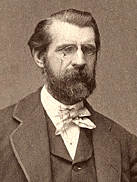

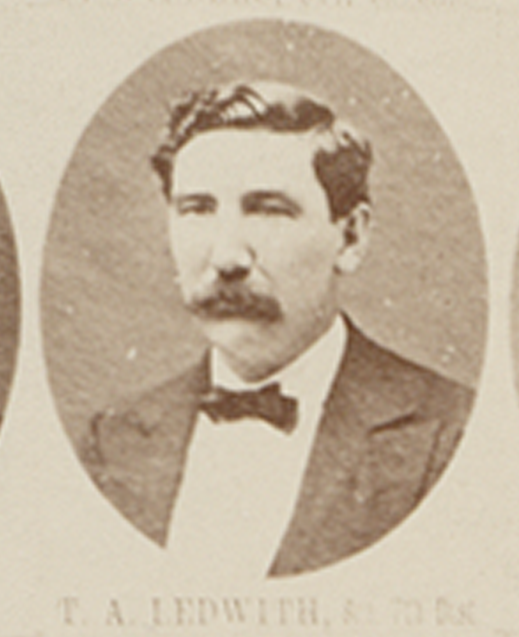
Nominee	A. Oakey Hall	Thomas A. Ledwith
Party	Democratic	Young Democracy
Alliance	Tammany Hall	Anti-Tammany; Republican
Popular vote	71,037	46,392
Percentage	60.49%	39.51%
Mayor before election
A. Oakey Hall
Democratic
Elected mayor
A. Oakey Hall
Democratic

The 1870 New York City mayoral election took place on November 8, 1870, to elect the Mayor of New York City.

A. Oakey Hall, the incumbent mayor backed by Tammany Hall, defeated anti-Tammany candidate Thomas A. Ledwith at the general election.

== Background ==
During the campaign of 1869, a legal question arose as to whether Mayor Hall had been elected for two years or merely for the unexpired year of Hoffman's term. Hall claimed a two-years' term, and the best lawyers supported the claim. But to make sure of the matter, Tammany Hall, in the late days of the campaign, instructed its members and followers to cast ballots for him, and the Police Commissioners distributed special ballot boxes for the Mayoralty vote. As no proclamation of the election had been issued, the Republicans and other opponents of Tammany Hall had no opportunity to make nominations. Mayor Hall consequently received nearly the entire number of votes cast—65,568 (98.4%), out of a total of 66,619.

In early 1870, urged by various motives, a number of leaders in Tammany Hall united against Boss Tweed. They were led by Henry W. Genet, John Fox, John Morrissey, and James O'Brien, among others, and called themselves the "Young Democracy." Together they planned to induce the state legislature to pass a measure known as the Huckleberry charter, the object of which was to abolish the State commissions governing the city and to obtain a relegation of their powers to the Board of Aldermen. Some members of the Democracy boasted that they would "put the charter through" if it took $200,000 to do it. However, when this money didn't arrive, the members of the legislature voted down the charter. Greatly encouraged by his enemies' defeat, Tweed, then a State Senator, went to Albany with a vast sum of money and the draft of a new charter.

The charter, which immediately became known as the "Tweed charter," was passed on April 5. One consequence of this was the abolition of the December city election, and the merging into one day's polling of national, State and city elections, making it the first mayoral election held in November since 1856.

== General election ==
=== Results ===
1870 New York City Mayoral Election
Party	Candidate	Votes	%
Democratic	A. Oakey Hall (incumbent)	71,037	60.49%
Young Democracy	Thomas A. Ledwith	46,392	39.51%
Total votes		117,429	100.00%

=== Results by ward ===
Results by ward
Ward	Hall Democratic		Ledwith Young Dem.		Total
Ward	Votes	%	Votes	%	Votes
1	1,388	64.77%	755	35.23%	2,143
2	152	51.53%	143	48.47%	295
3	465	69.92%	200	30.08%	665
4	2,630	78.91%	703	21.09%	3,333
5	1,454	55.35%	1,173	44.65%	2,627
6	3,179	81.83%	706	18.17%	3,885
7	4,667	78.11%	1,308	21.89%	5,975
8	3,910	76.00%	1,235	24.00%	5,145
9	3,148	48.99%	3,278	51.01%	6,426
10	2,651	66.61%	1,329	33.39%	3,980
11	5,073	73.28%	1,850	26.72%	6,923
12	4,413	69.29%	1,956	30.71%	6,369
13	3,005	69.32%	1,330	30.68%	4,335
14	2,246	56.66%	1,718	43.34%	3,964
15	1,850	50.27%	1,830	49.73%	3,680
16	2,655	42.68%	3,566	57.32%	6,221
17	6,372	63.16%	3,717	36.84%	10,089
18	4,484	58.41%	3,193	41.59%	7,677
19	4,889	52.91%	4,351	47.09%	9,240
20	4,617	51.75%	4,305	48.25%	8,922
21	3,486	49.74%	3,523	50.26%	7,009
22	4,303	50.47%	4,223	49.53%	8,526
Totals	71,037	60.49%	46,392	39.51%	117,429
