= Hyer =

Hyer is a surname. Notable people with the surname include:

- Bruce Hyer (born 1946), Canadian politician
- David Hyer (1875–1942), American architect
- Jacob Hyer (died 1838), American bare-knuckled boxer
- Martha Hyer (1924–2014), American actress
- Paul Hyer (1926–2018), American academic
- Robert Stewart Hyer (1860–1929), American educator and researcher
- Tom Hyer (1819–1864), American bare-knuckle boxer

== See also ==
- Hyers, West Virginia
- Hyers Sisters
