= Country McCleester =

American boxer

John McCleester
- Occupations: Sportsman and pugilist
- Employer: Tammany Hall
- Known for: lieutenant of Colonel Isaiah Rynders; cornerman of Yankee Sullivan.
- Political party: Democratic Party

George "Country McCloskey" McCheester or John McCleester (fl. 1841–1850) was an American bare-knuckle boxer and sportsman involved in the early history of pugilism and prize fighting in Old New York. A contender for the American heavyweight championship in 1849, he was an enforcer for the Irish Tammany Hall politicians, and a member of Isaiah Rynders Empire Club of Democratic toughs opposed the policies of Nativist New York Mayor James Harper.

== American heavyweight boxing championship ==
Hyer in boxing pose, 1849

A well known fighter in his youth, his 1841 title bout with Tom Hyer at Caldwell's Landing reportedly lasted nearly 3 hours and went to 101 rounds before the "Pride of Chatham Square" seconds threw up the sponge. Hyer began the bout with an eight-pound weight advantage as well as an advantage in height of several inches.

The first 11 rounds seemed to favor McClosky, but the tide turned by the 28th when Hyer unleashed a tremendous, left-hander on Country's nose, which caused serious bleeding. In the forty-fourth Hyer, with a tremendous blow, opened a deep gash in Country's head. After seventy-three rounds had been fought neither would give in, although McClosky was terribly injured. In the 74th, both men were knocked to the ground, and yet the fight continued. It was clear by the 90th round that McClosky could not win. In the ninety-fifth round McCloskey was knocked down again and was badly injured. Again his seconds tried to stop the fight, but he begged to be allowed to fight while he still had sight. By the 100th round, in complete control, Hyer could hit McCloskey at will as he put up little defense. After the 101st, Yankee Sullivan, McCloskey's chief second exclaimed, "It is no use Country, banging at him. he's got you licked." In the brutal affair, McClosky was said to have been beaten til his friends could barely recognize him. Considered one of the greatest fights in the city's history, Hyer was recognized as the top fighter in the United States and awarded the American heavyweight championship.

He and Yankee Sullivan were part of a group of promoters arrested following the death of boxer Thomas McCoy who died during a match against Christopher Lilly in Westchester County on September 13, 1842. Sullivan, who was the main promoter, was sentenced to two years in prison while McCleester and the others received light jail sentences or fines. McCleester had served as one of the cornermen during the bout.

McCleester was initially associated with the Irish gangs who were supporters of the corrupt Tammany Hall political machine. He became involved with Captain Isaiah Rynders' Empire Club, with John Morrissey during the early 1840s, a non-partisan group that had both Democrats and Whigs and protested some of the policy's of New York Mayor James Harper. and eventually became an active member of the Democratic Party. Around the time of the nomination for Henry Clay, an Empire club member was supposed to have been offered $2,000 to bring himself and McCleester, Manny Kelly, Bill Ford, Mike Philips and Dave Scandlin over to the rival Anti-immigrant, anti-Irish, and anti-Catholic Whig Unionist Club. It was hoped that McCleester and the others would be able to bolster support for the Whigs, but the offer was refused.

Involved in graft, corruption and election fraud in Manhattan's Sixth Ward during the 1840s and 50s, later to become known as the Tweed Ring, McCleester was one of several lieutenants to Isaiah Rynders, along with Dirty Face Jack, Edward Z.C. Judson and Yankee Sullivan. He later accompanied Yankee Sullivan, another enforcer for the Irish backed by Tammany Hall, as his cornerman during Sullivan's much publicized battle against Hyer in Still Pond Creek, Maryland on February 7, 1849. After the 16th round, McCleester signaled to the referee to stop the match. Three months later, he and Dirty Face Jack assisted Rynders in instigating the Astor Place Riot in which an Irish-American mob chased British actor William Charles Macready from the Astor Opera House.

He was among several prominent sportsmen who supported Rynders when, in the autumn of 1850, he announced his intention to become active in the Sixth Ward and run for the state assembly. McCleester was present along with Bill Ford, Tom Maguire and Hen Chenfrau when Rynders attended the primary meeting at Dooley's Long Room with "hundreds of the captain's friends". Opposition from Matthew T. Brennan, Constantine J. Donoho and other Five Points political leaders however, who considered the political club thugs and squatters, eventually defeated Rynders over control of the ward.

Achievements
Preceded by Vacant	American Heavyweight Bare-knuckle Boxing Championship Contender; Vacant– September 9, 1841	Succeeded by Tom Hyer
