= Isaiah Rynders =

American businessman, sportsman, underworld figure and political organizer

- Born: 1804
- Died: January 3, 1885 (aged 80–81); New York City, US
- Occupations: Political organizer and underworld figure
- Employer: Tammany Hall
- Known for: Founder of the Empire Club and ward boss of New York's Sixth Ward during the 1840s and 1850s.
- Political party: Democratic Party
- Spouse: Phoebe Shotwell

Captain Isaiah Rynders (1804 – January 3, 1885) was an American businessman, sportsman, underworld figure and political organizer for Tammany Hall. Founder of the Empire Club, a powerful political organization in New York during the mid-19th century, his "sluggers" committed voter intimidation and election fraud on behalf of Tammany Hall throughout the 1840s and 1850s before Tammany became an exclusively Irish-dominated institution.

He held considerable influence in Tammany Hall for twenty-five years and was credited for delivering New York to James K. Polk and securing his election as President of the United States. He was similarly successful in the presidential elections of Franklin Pierce and James Buchanan, the latter appointing him U.S. Marshal of the Southern District of New York. Although Rynders Street (now part of Centre Street) is sometimes said to have been named in his honor, the street name was in use as early as 1794, prior to his birth.

Although nominally loyal to Tammany for the majority of his career, his Empire Club heading the fight against the nativist Know Nothing movement for over a decade, Rynders aligned himself with the Know Nothings for a brief period during the 1850s. This eventually brought him into conflict with his former protégé John Morrissey who would eventually replace him as political boss of the Sixth Ward.

== Biography ==
Born to a German-American father and an Irish Protestant mother, Rynders first appeared in New York City during the mid-1830s, after a brief career as a professional gambler and pistol-and-knife fighter on the Mississippi River, and soon became involved in local politics.

An enthusiastic supporter of Tammany Hall, he established himself as one of the most politically skilled organizers in the city. He was said to have "sometimes permitted his love of the Irish and hatred for the English to upset his judgment", however he also recognized the value of using the numerous street gangs for Tammany Hall. Owner of at least half a dozen green-groceries in Paradise Square, he was able to win the predominantly Irish-American gangs to the cause of Tammany Hall and organize them into a voting block. He later established a network of saloons and gambling parlors which supported his political club and generated revenue for Tammany Hall.

He originally operated from Sweeney's House of Refreshment, an Ann Street tavern popular with volunteer firefighters, before founding the Empire Club in 1843. The Park Row clubhouse quickly became the political hub of the Sixth Ward and, through a heavy campaign of voter intimidation and election fraud, he was credited for securing the presidency of Democratic candidate James K. Polk during the United States presidential election of 1844.

It was also the headquarters from which he directed his lieutenants such as Country McCleester, Edward Z.C. Judson, Paudeen McLaughlin, Jim Turner, Lew Baker and John Morrissey and the Dead Rabbits against the Know Nothings and their Bowery supporters which included the Atlantic Guards and the Bowery Boys. Rynders was alleged to have been involved in instigating the Astor Place Riot in 1849. He later made trips to Philadelphia, Baltimore and New Orleans where he advised local Democratic leaders on Tammany-style machine politics.

By the end of the decade, he was considered to be the de facto leader of the Five Points street gangs and was often requested by authorities to use his influence to cease rioting and gang-related violence which the police were unable to stop. He was a particularly important figure in civil disturbances against abolitionists during the period encountering such people as Frederick Douglass and Abby Gibbons.

On one occasion, the famous abolitionist Wendell Phillips was stopped from speaking at the Broadway Tabernacle when Rynders, a proponent of slavery, publicly threatened that he and his men would "wreck the building and mob the audience".

Henry Ward Beecher invited Phillips to speak at Plymouth Church and, when a mob led by Rynders followed Phillips, he and his followers were met by a group of well-armed men who defended the building. It was during this meeting that Phillips not only spoke out against slavery but also of the corruption of Tammany Hall.

Rynders was involved in the successful presidential elections of Franklin Pierce and James Buchanan, during the presidential elections of 1852 and 1856 respectively, and was appointed by Buchanan as U.S. Marshal for the Southern District of New York in 1857.

On June 9, 1854, Rynders married 20-year-old Phoebe Shotwell, the last surviving child of real estate mogul John Shotwell and Phoebe Byron, in Washington, D.C. For a brief time during this period, he renamed his political organization the Americus Club and switched his allegiances to the Know Nothings causing a deep rift between him and his Irish supporters, most notably his protégé John Morrissey.

This decision would lead to his downfall as the political boss of the Sixth Ward when, during the Dead Rabbits Riot in 1857, he was attacked and pelted with rocks while attempting to persuade the warring gangsters to cease fighting. His reputation suffered considerably after this point and Morrissey eventually replaced Rynders as head of the Sixth Ward.

Rynders remained in politics, attending the 1860 Democratic National Convention as a regular member of the New York delegation

In early 1861, he was ordered by Chairman Morris to find William Hepburn Russell and return him to Washington, D.C. but telegraphed the capitol on March 2 that he was unable to locate him. Rynders reported that he had heard rumors that Russell was residing in Philadelphia but that he did not believe the report. He was among several Tammany political leaders who opposed the American Civil War, going so far as to support Mayor Fernando Wood's proposal to take New York City out of the Union, and later fought the federal government over conscription prior to the New York Draft Riots in 1863.

While also acting in his capacity as a U.S. marshal, he was responsible for the attempted capture of fellow Tammany operative Isaac Vanderbeck Fowler. Upon entry to the hotel where Fowler was staying, Rynders made such a ruckus that Fowler was able to escape and eventually landed in Mexico.

Rynders was portrayed in the historical novel The Furies (1976) by John Jakes and Lucrecia Mott (1999) by Dorothy Sterling.
