= Tom Hyer =

American boxer

- Hyer, circa 1849, in his prime

Personal information
- Nicknames: Young American; Bowery King; Chief Hyer
- Nationality: American (United States)
- Born: Thomas Hyer; 1 January 1819 New York City, New York
- Died: 26 June 1864 (aged 45) New York City, New York
- Height: 6 ft 2 in (1.88 m); Varies downward slightly in records
- Weight: 180 lb (82 kg), heavyweight

Boxing career
- Stance: Orthodox; Long reach, right handed Used London Prize Ring Rules

Boxing record
- Total fights: 3 * professional bouts only
- Wins: 2
- Win by KO: 2
- Losses: 1

Tom Hyer (January 1, 1819 – June 26, 1864) was an American bare-knuckle boxer. He became a heavyweight boxing champion after defeating Country McCloskey in a long brutal fight in New York on September 9, 1841, though there was no sanctioning body to recognize his championship. Until he retired in 1851, he was widely celebrated as the first Heavyweight Boxing Champion of America. His victory increased American participation in boxing, and made him a celebrity; generating fight coverage and publicity in hundreds of American newspapers.

Hyer was a brawler and engaged in several bar fights. The fights he had as a result of his political association with the nativist Bowery Boys' anti-immigration gang in 1855, were often particularly violent, and often involved weapons.

== Early life and boxing strengths ==
Thomas Hyer was born in New York City, New York, on 1 Jan 1819. Documentation proving the date of his birth, his father's birth, and that of his ancestors is found in 'Hyer and Allied Families' by Claudia E. Thomas, published 2022 Tom died 26 June 1864 in New York City, New York. The book also addresses the error of the 1944 article stating he was born in Pennsylvania.

He worked as a butcher at the old Washington Market in New York before entering boxing; staying with butchering as a sideline. After he had won several fights, he opened a bar on New York's Park Row attended widely by Know Nothing Party friends, New York natives, who were anti-immigration. He was of Dutch ancestry, a heritage common among New York's earliest settlers. His father Jacob Hyer also worked as a butcher, and briefly earned a living as a boxer, reportedly fighting an opponent named Tom Beasley in 1816, using the older Broughton rules of England, in what is now considered the first official boxing match known to have been held in America. Tom's father broke his arm in the fight, and never boxed again.

Hyer before Sullivan bout with flag sash, left extended

In his boxing prime, as seen at left, Tom Hyer had a huge chest, and long, muscular rangy arms with extremely wide shoulders, that gave him both strength and reach. His long legs and springy hips helped give speed, leverage, power, and placement to his punches.

His favorite blow was a crushing left to the collarbone. He was not known as a scientific boxer with exceptionally finessed defensive skills, but was more of a brawler who had to trade blows in order to deliver a blow of his own. A signature move was to lead with a left swing, which he sometimes feinted, in order to score with a well placed short right uppercut. He used this strategy to win his fights against both Country McCloskey and Yankee Sullivan. Fine scientific boxing with a calculated defense involving feints with the arms and forward foot were rarely a feature of bareknuckle boxing in the 1840s, nor necessary with the undisciplined nature of London Prize Ring Rules. Other than gouging, hitting a man when he was down, kicking, hitting or grabbing below the waist, most moves were permitted, including throwing a man down or holding him to inflict blows. Unlike London Prize rules where a round ended anytime a man's knee touched the ground, the Marquess of Queensberry rules used today required gloves, had fixed three minute rounds, and made it illegal to throw a man down or to hold him to inflict blows.

== Heavyweight Champion of America, 1841 ==
Hyer was recognized as the bare-knuckle boxing Heavyweight Champion of America after a 101-round victory over George McCheester, known as Country McCloskey, at Caldwell's Landing in New York City, on September 9, 1841. McClosky was one of several lieutenants to Isaiah Rynders who supported the Tweed Ring, backers of the corrupt Tammany Hall political machine and rivals of Hyer and his supporters. The intense battle in the scorching sun of the open air arena reportedly lasted 2 hours, fifty minutes before McCloskey's seconds threw up the sponge ending the bout in the 101st round. Hyer began with roughly an eight-pound weight advantage as well as an inch advantage in height. The first 11 rounds seemed to favor McClosky, but the tide turned by the 28th when Hyer unleashed a tremendous, left-hander on Country's nose, which caused serious bleeding. In the forty-fourth Hyer, with a tremendous blow, opened a deep gash in Country's head. After seventy-three rounds had been fought neither would give in, although McClosky was terribly injured. In the 74th, both men were knocked to the ground, and yet the fight continued. It was clear by the 90th round that McClosky could not win. In the ninety-fifth round McCloskey was knocked down again and was obviously badly injured. Again his seconds tried to stop the fight, but he begged to be allowed to fight while he still had sight. By the 100th round, in complete control, Hyer could hit McCloskey at will as he put up little defense. After the 101st, Yankee Sullivan, McCloskey's chief second exclaimed, "It is no use Country, banging at him. he's got you licked." In the brutal affair, McClosky was said to have been beaten til his friends could barely recognize him. Considering the intensity of the bout, it is not surprising that Hyer did not fight again for eight-and-half years.

The death of Tom McCoy following his loss to Chris Lilly in Westchester County on September 13, 1842, led to a more vigorous enforcement of the laws against prizefighting, and ultimately delayed the matching of Hyer with Yankee Sullivan. Sullivan had been arrested and imprisoned for nearly two years after the fight for working as its principal promoter.

In 1842, Hyer was challenged by the Heavyweight Champion of England Ben Caunt, but no fight was held. Caunt had come to America to look for bouts, but was not willing to make a match after his arrival. Believing he would not receive a favorable deal, he returned to England.

=== Bout with Yankee Sullivan, 1849 ===
==== Factions behind the fight ====
Yankee Sullivan

Hyer first met "Yankee Sullivan", an Irishman with the real name James Ambrose, at an Oyster Bar at the corner of New York's Broadway and Park Place early in 1849. Sullivan had planned to meet him there for a brawl, possibly for publicity, but according to most newspapers of the day, with the clear intent of doing him harm. Hyer was reported to have won the brief encounter, and then loaded a pistol to protect himself from Sullivan's soon- to-arrive supporters. They arrived shortly after, but the police intervened and prevented any bloodshed. Sullivan had acted as a second to McClosky in his loss to Hyer in 1841, and had hoped to avenge McClosky by defeating Hyer. According to one source, Sullivan was a bit of a ruffian and petty criminal when he was boxing in London during his early fighting days, and was sent to a British penal colony in Australia, to serve time. His battle with Hyer was more than a prize fight. It was a statement by two warring factions in New York, in short "a proxy battle between anti-immigrant nativists represented by Hyer and his Bowery Boys gang, and the Irish immigrants backed by Tammany Hall, and represented by Sullivan and his followers. As noted by Chris Klein, "Boxing was closely involved with politics in America after the Civil War, and fighters forged close ties with corrupt urban political machines that relied on muscle (and often gangs) to help their candidates win elections". Opposing political factions often made up gangs and expressed their animosity using warfare in the streets, on occasion taking over balloting places to secure their candidates would win.

==== Maryland sends militia ====
Seeking to stop Sullivan and Hyer from fighting, George Richardson, the Attorney General of Maryland, where boxing was banned, sent two companies of state militia to Pooles Island, where the fight was originally intended to take place, but the boxers moved the bout East to Still Pond heights. Though 300 souls had first steamed to Pooles to observe the fight, only 200 or so spectators were said to attend the bout, as others may have been frightened of arrest by the Maryland militia, as a cornerman for Sullivan and George Thompson, the trainer for Hyer had earlier spent a brief stay in jail after being arrested on Pooles Island.

According to the Police Gazette, and other sources Hyer had nearly a four-inch height advantage, and as much as a thirty-pound advantage in weight over Sullivan: a disparity that would likely have prevented their being matched today. Hyer's advantage in reach gave him another important edge in the fight. On February 7, 1849, Hyer finally defeated Sullivan in a scorching battle that commenced around 4:00 pm. The match went 16 rounds at Still Pond Creek, a cold and snowy outdoor arena on the East Maryland shore, ten miles below Poole's Island where the fight was originally planned. The close betting gave the edge to Sullivan, 100 to 89. Despite his being the smaller man, Sullivan had been undefeated in eight fights, primarily in Australia and England, and had claimed the Middleweight Championship of England in February 1841, against Johnny "Hammer" Lane.

==== Details of the Sullivan fight ====
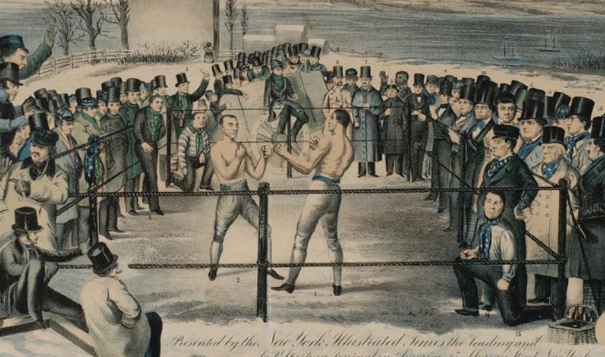
From Painting of Sullivan fight, 1849, Hyer, right, Chesapeake Bay behind

Sullivan hoped to use what he believed to be an advantage in grappling, to weaken the larger Hyer by way of hard throws, legal in London Prize Ring Rules. When this failed, Hyer's superior reach and height allowed him to dominate Sullivan. Several accounts do report that Sullivan attempted to throw Hyer early in the match with some success, and credited him with the first three. As the fight progressed, Sullivan was down in the fourth and again in the sixth, but arose. Within 17 minutes of the start of the bout, Sullivan was badly hurt, and had had his right eye lanced to prevent it from swelling shut. By the thirteenth round, Sullivan was flagging badly, taking almost two blows to each one he weakly delivered to Hyer. Sullivan's right arm was wrenched in the 15th.

According to the Milwaukee Sentinel, writing the day after the fight, once Sullivan was exhausted, Hyer caught his head under his arm before he could fall in the 15th, and punched him repeatedly. This attack ended the bout, and Sullivan could not return for the 16th. Several telegraphed reports received the day after the fight as well as the detailed written account by the reliable Brooklyn Daily Eagle confirm this account and it appears to be accurate. Published years later, the Police Gazette did not make mention of Hyer holding Sullivan around the head, but did accurately note that the fight ended after Hyer dropped Sullivan to the ground at the end of the 15th and fell on top of him. When Hyer stood up, it was clear, Sullivan could not continue. Sullivan, unable to rise at the end, had to be carted off by his seconds.

After being declared the winner, Hyer followed the tradition of London Prize Ring Rules, and tore Sullivan's green and white silk banner, representing the colors of Ireland, from its stake by the ring and triumphantly displayed it to the crowd. Hyer's banner was the American Stars and Stripes, in some ways representing his alliance with the nationalist, somewhat anti-immigrant, Whig Party; which was allied with the Know-Nothing Party. After the bout, Sullivan was taken to Mt. Hope Hospital where he was treated for his injured arm, badly blackened eyes and a slight skull fracture, but released the following day. The fight lasted 17 minutes, 18 seconds and Hyer won an exceptionally large $10,000 purse in a battle that he dominated, though Sullivan took his $10,000 as well. Much of the way back from Chesapeake Bay to New York, Hyer was greeted and cheered by large crowds that lined the streets of cities and towns, for parades of victory. This was a widely publicized boxing match at the time and helped to ignite the sport's popularity, despite the bout being illegal in Maryland, and clearly a brutal affair.

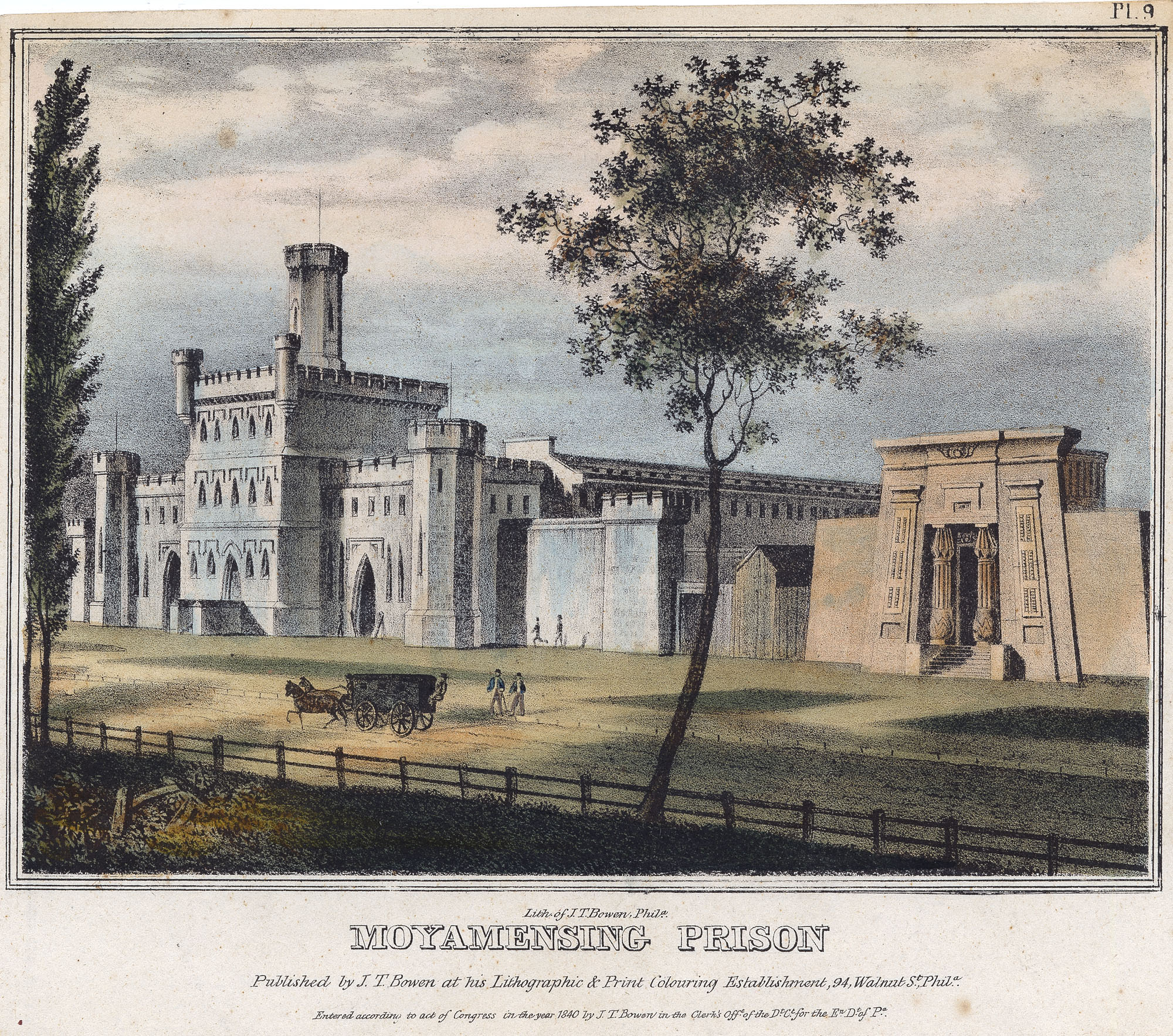
Moyamensing Prison, 1840

Two days later, Hyer was celebrated when he arrived in Philadelphia by a triumphal procession after his victory over Sullivan, and there were even exaggerated reports in the newspapers of his becoming a Whig candidate for the Presidency of the United States. Once the celebrations ended, Hyer was required to attend a hearing in Philadelphia before a judge who was waiting for a requisition from the Governor of Maryland to prosecute him for the fight. He was briefly held at Moyamensing Prison while waiting for the requisition from Maryland, but it never arrived.

In mid-April, 1849, Hyer appeared in a sold-out performance at Griffin's Mansion House in Albany, New York with his trainer, George Thompson, to perform the play "Tom and Jerry". The play was a theatrical adaptation of the boxing historian Pierce Egan's Life in London.

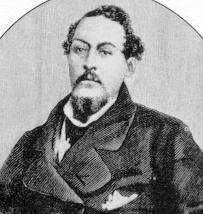
Thomas Hyer Circa 1850s

== Vacating championship, 1851 ==
In 1850, Hyer challenged the "Tipton Slasher", William Perry, reigning Heavyweight Champion of England, but no fight was held.

In 1851, Hyer retired from the ring and relinquished the Heavyweight Championship of America; whereupon Yankee Sullivan claimed the title. Hyer would not fully retire from the ring, and though he would continue to contract fights, very few would take place.

=== Boxing comeback attempt ===
On October 26, 1854, one source reports that Hyer lost to Pat McGowan in St. Louis in a little-known first round disqualification. The Evening Star noted that the boxer was not Tom Hyer but another boxer of the same name from California, and that the fight went a rough 64 rounds. On July 20, 1857, Hyer lost decisively to Tom Hunter in Washington, D.C., in his last known fight. To the knowledge of most Americans, he retired undefeated, as his last fight was very poorly publicized.

=== Association with "Bowery Boys", 1854-5 ===
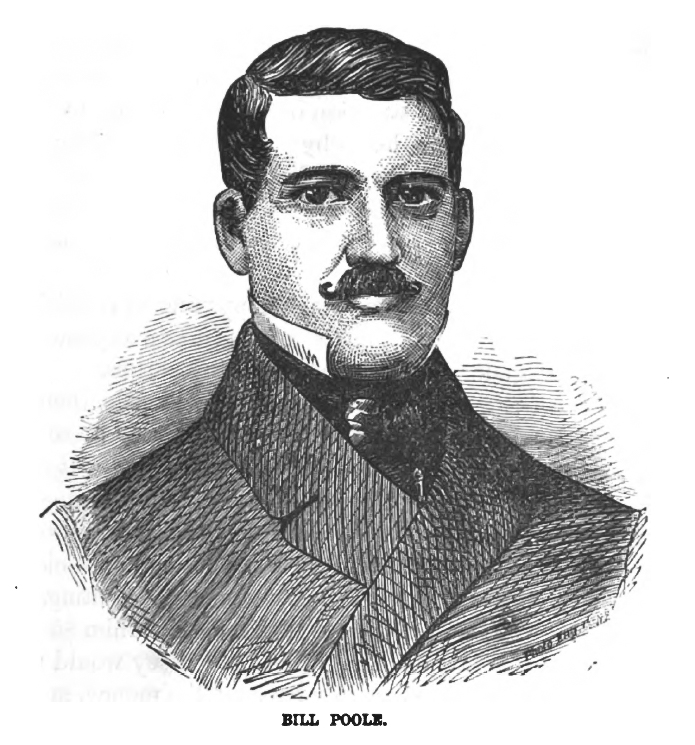
William Poole of Bowery Boys

John Morrissey, circa 1860

In 1854 Hyer was scheduled to fight Irishman John Morrissey, at one time the head of New York's mostly Irish Dead Rabbits gang, who were rivals of Hyer's anti-immigrant gang, the Bowery Boys, but Morrissey did not show for the fight. Morrissey and Hyer were later scheduled to fight a duel in mid-February 1855 over a sum of money, around $100, owed to Morrisey from Hyer as a result of the fight not taking place, but though Morrissey arrived, Hyer and Hughes, the party to duel Morrissey, did not.

Morrissey would defeat "Yankee" Sullivan, on September 1, 1853, and later become a United States congressman from New York in 1867, backed by New York's corrupt political machine, Tammany Hall. Like many Irish pugilists backed by Tammany Hall, Morrissey was a rival of William Poole, head of the Bowery Boys Gang, and on August 8, 1854, a fight was arranged between Poole and Morrissey at the corner of "West and Amos-street". Poole forced Morrissey to end the fight in an extremely brutal exchange.

Hyer, 1850s

Hyer was associated financially and politically with William Poole's Bowery Boys gang, native-born New Yorkers who generally supported the Know Nothing anti-immigrant political party, but opposed Catholics, the Irish, and the corrupt Irish political machine, Tammany Hall. On mid-January, 1855, Hyer was reported to have been struck and injured in the head twice by the butt of a heavy revolver in an incident at New York's Platt's Hall below Wallick's Theater, by the former boxer Lew Baker, a rival of the Bowery Boys gang. Also present was Henry Young and Jim Turner, a former boxer and friend of Baker, who also briefly assaulted Hyer. Hyer filed an assault charge against the three men two days later. Turner was also accused in the same month on January 6 of attempting to fire a shot at Hyer, at the Broadway Bar with his six shooter, though the gun missed, and when Hyer returned a shot at Turner it missed, preventing both men from serious injury. A few accounts record Hyer may have had his neck grazed by a bullet from Turner in the altercation.

Hyer was not known to have been present two weeks later at another gang incident at New York's Stanwix Hall at 1:00 on February 24, where Poole was shot and wounded in the leg by Lew Baker, and further assaulted by others He eventually died at his home. Also present at the February 24 incident was John Morrissey, well known to Hyer, a rival with whom he had previously scheduled a bout. The life of William Poole and the Bowery Bows gang is depicted in highly fictionalized form, in Martin Scorsese's 2002 film Gangs of New York.

In January 1855, Hyer was arrested and apprehended in New York on charges of running a gambling house on Park Place, in New York.

== Life after boxing, 1857-64 ==
Taking advantage of his political connections, in 1857 Hyer was appointed Superintendent of Lands and Places, by New York Street Commissioner Connor. Other pugilists were appointed to positions as well.

As late as 1860, Hyer was reported to have been in Washington, D.C., offering to give sparring lessons to Congressmen. In the same year, according to one source, Hyer attempted to schedule fights with the "Benicia Boy", John C. Heenan, but satisfactory terms were not met.

After his full retirement from the ring, he lived briefly in Washington, D.C. According to one account, he became a good friend of both Abraham Lincoln and Secretary of State William Seward, which seems plausible considering his national prominence and his political connections with the Whig Party. Hyer met Lincoln in 1861 in New York City when Lincoln was traveling to Washington for his inauguration. Before the war he briefly ran a saloon near Laura Kern's Theater.

=== Union Army service ===
In the Civil War, Hyer worked as a sutler, selling wares including food from the back of a wagon or tent, and traveling with the Union Army as it went from field to field. He contacted rheumatism during the winter of 1862 while sutlering at Hooker's camp, and returned to Washington disabled. His condition may have been exacerbated by his boxing injuries and the wounds he received from James Turner in 1855.

=== Death from cardiac edema ===
He was ill for four months prior to his death. To help raise money for his care and his family, a benefit was given to him shortly before his death around June 21, 1864, at New York's Stuyvesant Hall, where thousands gathered to see him briefly address the crowd from his wheel chair, accompanied by thunderous applause.

Hyer died on June 26, 1864, at his home in Brooklyn, with a reported cause of death as "cardiac dropsy" or edema as it is now known. A few accounts report that his early demise was at least partly due to excessive drinking. His funeral took place on June 28. Hyer was survived by his mother and wife, the former Emma Beke of Maine and his one daughter, Charlotte, who later married Floyd Grant. After Hyer's funeral, which was poorly attended, John Morrissey, a former rival, contributed $250 to Hyer's widow and mother, with an additional $250 raised by others in attendance. He and his family were interred at the Green-Wood Cemetery in Brooklyn, New York, where a large monument marks his burial site.

Regarding Tom Hyer's 'daughter' Charlotte. She was the daughter of his wife by a previous marriage of hers. Tom Hyer had no children of his own. Gammie was writing based on basic information available to him at the time; however, "Hyer and Allied Families" by Claudia E. Thomas, published in 2022, gives the proof behind Tom not having children of his own, along with his true heritage, Emma's various relationships, and much more. See footnote 3.

He was inducted into Ring Magazine's Boxing Hall of Fame in 1954.

== Selected fights and important brawls ==
3 Wins, 1 Loss
Result	Opponent(s)	Date	Location	Duration	Notes
Win	Country McCloskey	9 September 1841	Caldwell Landing, New York	101 rounds, 2:55 minutes	Bare knuckle Heavyweight Championship of America
Win	"Yankee" Sullivan	Early 1849	Bar on New York's Broadway and Park Place	Stopped when Sullivan was injured and police arrived	Bar fight, backed by Hyer's No-nothing party nativist faction vs. Sullivan's Irish pro-immigrant faction
Win	"Yankee" Sullivan	7 February 1849	Still Pond Creek, Maryland	16 rounds, 17 minutes	Defended heavyweight championship
Draw	Lew Baker, later Jim Turner	January–February 1855	Platt's Hall, later Broadway Bar, New York	Not professional contests	Two Violent Bar room fights defending Bowery Boys gang Gunfight w/Jim Turner January 6
Loss	Tom Hunter	13 July 1857	Washington, D.C.	Duration unknown	Not widely publicized; little known bout

== See also ==
- William Poole

== Achievements ==
Achievements
Preceded by Country McCloskey	Heavyweight Bare-knuckle Boxing Champion; September 9, 1841– Vacated 1851	Succeeded by Yankee Sullivan
