= Jim Turner (criminal) =

American criminal figure (fl. 1854–1866)

- Born: James Turner
- Occupations: Criminal and pugilist
- Known for: Tammany Hall "slugger"; involved in the murder of William "Bill the Butcher" Poole.

James Turner (fl. 1854–1866) was an American criminal figure, pugilist and "slugger" for Tammany Hall. Turner was one of several men under Captain Isaac Rynders who committed voter intimidation and election fraud for Tammany Hall during the 1850s. He and Paudeen McLaughlin were bodyguards to Lew Baker and were present with him when Baker fatally shot William "Bill the Butcher" Poole in the back in 1855.

== Biography ==
A Californian-born thug and pugilist, Turner was forced to leave the state by the San Francisco Vigilance Committee in 1854. He eventually surfaced in New York City where he found employment with Captain Isaac Rynders and his Empire Club. In a short time, he became one of the Rynders' most feared "sluggers". In January 1855, Turner and Lew Baker entered Platt's Hall and became involved in a verbal altercation with prizefighter Tom Hyer "calling the fighter vile names". The argument escalated until Turner drew his pistol and shot Hyer in the neck. Hyer fired back but missed, hitting the wall instead. Putting away his weapon, Hyer attacked his assailants and dragged Baker out into the street, but the fight came to an end when a police officer arrived. The fight was broken up, but no charges were brought against the three.

On the night of February 25, 1855, Turner and Paudeen McLaughlin accompanied Lew Baker when he entered Stanwix Hall saloon to confront William "Bill the Butcher" Poole over an argument he and John Morrissey had several hours before. Although most accounts claim Baker shot Poole when the two began fighting, another version has Turner and McLaughlin participating in the barroom brawl, according to retired police chief George Washington Walling In this version, Turner pulled out a pistol to fire at Poole, using the hollow of his left arm as a rest, but shot himself in the arm with an eight-inch Colt Navy Revolver.

While falling to the floor, it was Turner who fired the second shot that hit Poole in the leg. Poole staggered towards Baker who drew his own revolver and shot him twice then left the bar with Turner and McLaughlin. He and McLaughlin were arrested soon after and imprisoned in separate cells in The Tombs. Turner was charged with a number of other men including Baker, McLaughlin, Morrissey, Cornelius Linn, Charles Van Pelt, John Huyler and James Irving among others, but all were eventually acquitted of the murder.

On the morning of August 30, 1860, Turner was arrested and charged with assaulting a West Broadway resident, Edward Leonard, beating him so severely that he was hospitalized and confined to a bed. Turner was sent to The Tombs in default of a $500 bail by the presiding magistrate. He was sent to the Workhouse on March 28, 1866, in default of $1,000 bail for his good behavior, after being charged with fighting, using foul language and striking Mary Ann Scott with a hot poker.
