= 1844 in sports =

1844 in sports describes the year's events in world sport.

== Boxing ==
Events

- Ben Caunt and Tom Hyer retain the Championships of England and the United States respectively but there is no record of any fights involving either of them in 1844.

== Cricket ==
Events

- First ever international cricket match, between Canada and the United States, takes place at St George's Cricket Club in New York.

England

- Most runs – Fuller Pilch 517 @ 17.82 (HS 50)
- Most wickets – William Hillyer 142 @ 11.98 (BB 7–41)

== Horse racing ==
England

- Grand National – Discount
- 1,000 Guineas Stakes – Sorella
- 2,000 Guineas Stakes – The Ugly Buck
- The Derby – Orlando
- The Oaks – The Princess
- St. Leger Stakes – Faugh-a-Ballagh

== Lacrosse ==
Events

- Montreal's Olympic Club organises a team specifically to play a match against an indigenous team

== Rowing ==
The Boat Race

- The Oxford and Cambridge Boat Race is not held this year
