= Senator Gerard =

Senator Gerard may refer to:

- James W. Gerard Jr. (1823–1900), New York State Senate
- Sumner Gerard (1916–2005), Montana State Senate
- Susan Gerard (born 1950), Arizona State Senate
