= Jacob Hyer =

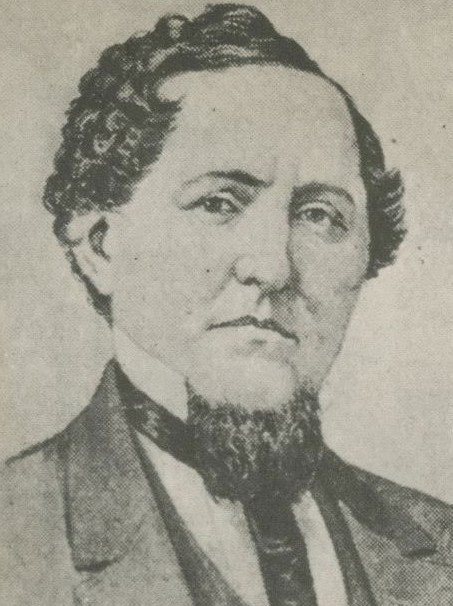

Personal information
- Nationality: American (United States)
- Born: Caernarvon Township, Lancaster County, Pennsylvania; May have been born in New York, Settled in New York, New York
- Died: 1838 Manhattan, New York
- Height: 6 ft 2 in (1.88 m)
- Weight: heavyweight, Usually 182 lb (83 kg)

Boxing career
- Stance: Orthodox; Long reach, right handed Used Broughton rules

Boxing record
- Total fights: 1 * professional bouts only
- Losses: 1

Jacob Hyer (died 1838) was an American bare-knuckled boxer. He is generally credited as the first professional American boxer, due to his 1816 match with Tom Beasley, and has even been called "The Father of The American Ring". Jacob was born 3 Mar 1796, New York City, New York, and died 29 Sep 1838 as proven, along with his ancestors, in 'Hyer and Allied Families' by Claudia E. Thomas, published 2022 Tom died 26 June 1864 in New York City, New York. The book also addresses the error of the 1944 article stating he was born in Pennsylvania.

== Hyer v. Beasley ==
Jacob's son Tom Hyer

In October 1816 in Manhattan, Hyer (a butcher) fought Tom Beasley (an English mariner) in what is traditionally said to be the first professional American bout, in that it was open to the public and English boxing rules, specifically the Broughton rules, were observed.

The fight has been described as a "grudge match," because the two had previously been involved in a street fight, and decided to settle the matter in a more formal venue.

Apparently the rules of boxing were at least followed at the outset of the match, but degenerated as the fight progressed. Different reports of the official bout stated that Beasley broke Hyers' arm (and thus Beasley won), that the match ended in a draw (due to the broken arm), or that Hyer won the match. Some modern sources state that Hyer won the match, though the basis for that conclusion is not stated. Hyer never fought again after this one fight.

Historian Elliot J. Gorn, writing in the 1980s, states that although Hyer broke his arm, Beasley had been badly beaten, so after mutual friends intervened it was declared a draw. Gorn also states that the match was not actually the first ring fight in America, or the first open to the public, but that its "significance lay in the perception that it was a historic event worth recording, in its being the earliest American fight kept alive as living memory of a heroic past. When men gathered at New York's Empire Club decades later, they recounted this battle time and again.... Hyer and Beasley were important because they were remembered as founding fathers."

== Legacy ==
Hyer was 6 ft 2 in (1.88 m) and approximately 182 pounds. He was born in New York, of Dutch descent. In 1969, Hyer was elected to the Ring Magazine Boxing Hall of Fame.

Hyer's son, Tom Hyer, became the first American heavyweight boxing champion. The younger Hyer's famous victory against Yankee Sullivan in 1849 greatly spurred the popularity of the sport and served to preserve the legacy of his father's pioneering fight.
