= Morgan Jones (American politician) =

American politician (1830–1894)

Member of the U.S. House of Representatives from New York's 4th district
- In office March 4, 1865 – March 3, 1867
- Preceded by: Benjamin Wood
- Succeeded by: John Fox

Personal details
- Born: February 26, 1830 London, England, U.K.
- Died: July 13, 1894 (aged 64) New York City, New York, U.S.
- Party: Democratic

Morgan Jones (February 26, 1830 – July 13, 1894) was an American businessman and politician who served one term as a U.S. Representative from New York from 1865 to 1867.

== Biography ==
Born in London, England, Jones immigrated in 1833 to the United States with his parents, who settled in New York City. He engaged in the plumbing business in 1850. He served as a member of the board of councilmen 1859–1863 and president of that body in 1860, 1861, and 1863. He served as a member of the board of aldermen in 1864 and 1865, the latter in which he served as president of the board.

=== Congress ===
Jones was elected as a Democrat to the Thirty-ninth Congress (March 4, 1865 – March 3, 1867).

=== Later career and death ===
He resumed business interests in New York City until 1887, when he retired. He died in that city on July 13, 1894.

He was interred in Green-Wood Cemetery, Brooklyn, New York.

U.S. House of Representatives
Preceded by Benjamin Wood	Member of the U.S. House of Representatives from New York's 4th congressional district 1865–1867	Succeeded by John Fox
