= Patrick McLaughlin (criminal) =

New York criminal

- Born: c. 1822; Cohoes Falls, New York, USA
- Died: March 20, 1858 (aged 35–36); Manhattan, New York, USA
- Cause of death: Gunshot
- Other name: Paudeen
- Allegiance: Tammany Hall

Details
- Imprisoned at: Blackwell's Island

Patrick "Paudeen" McLaughlin (c. 1822 – March 20, 1858) was a New York criminal and a "slugger" for Tammany Hall during the middle of the 19th century. He was regarded in the underworld for his skill with a bludgeon and slung-shot. McLaughlin's nose was chewed off during a brawl in the Five Points.

== Biography ==
McLaughlin was to Irish immigrants in Cohoes Falls, near Lansingburgh, New York. He left home at an early age to work as an immigrant runner in New York. He became a well known street fighter and was imprisoned for a time on Blackwell's Island. After being severely disfigured in a brawl with a future Alderman of the First Ward, he retired from immigrant running and was employed as hired muscle for the Erie Railroad Company for several years.

During the mid-1850s, he and Jim Turner were bodyguards for Lewis "Lew" Baker during his feud with William "Bill the Butcher" Poole. McLaughlin, Turner, and several others were convicted of aiding and abetting Baker after he shot and killed Poole on February 25, 1855.

On March 20, 1858, McLaughlin was involved in a fight at a Howard Street saloon and dance hall. He and sportsman Daniel "Dad" Cunningham had a heated argument after McLaughlin had derided the boxing abilities of John Morrissey. The two fought, and then Cunningham pulled a revolver and shot McLaughlin in the chest. McLaughlan was taken to the New York City Hospital, where he died of his wounds several hours later.
