= The Ring magazine Hall of Fame =

Boxing hall of fame

The Ring magazine was established in 1922. In 1954, the magazine established its own boxing Hall of Fame and inducted 155 members before it was abandoned after the 1987 inductions. Boxing inductions continue through the International Boxing Hall of Fame. 143 members of the old The Ring magazine Hall of Fame have been elected to the International Boxing Hall of Fame since 1990. The 12 members who have yet to be elected to the International Boxing Hall of Fame are listed below, with their year of induction into The Ring's Boxing Hall of Fame:

Modern Group

- 1973 – Gus Lesnevich
- 1977 – Ceferino Garcia
- 1977 – Yoshio Shirai

Old-Timers

- 1976 – Jimmy Britt
- 1978 – Peter Maher
- 1982 – Harry Jeffra

Pioneers

- 1962 – Ned Price
- 1964 – Sam Collyer
- 1968 – Jacob Hyer
- 1971 – Nobby Clark
- 1972 – Tom Chandler

Non-Participant

- 1977 – Dan Daniel
