= Lew Baker =

Welsh-American policeman and assassin

- Born: Lewis Baker c. 1825; Wales, United Kingdom
- Occupation: Police officer
- Employer: Tammany Hall
- Known for: Tammany Hall "slugger" and murderer of William "Bill the Butcher" Poole.

Lewis "Lew" Baker was a Welsh-American patrolman in the New York Police Department who was simultaneously employed as a "slugger" for Tammany Hall. He was involved in voter intimidation and election fraud during the 1840s and 1850s. A close friend and associate of Irish mob boss John Morrissey, Baker frequently battled supporters of the nativist Know-Nothing movement for over a decade. He is most remembered however as the assassin of William "Bill the Butcher" Poole. Baker shot and killed Poole in a Broadway saloon during a brawl. Both Baker and Morrissey were placed on trial for murder, but were acquitted.

== Early life and Tammany Hall ==
Born around 1825, Baker immigrated to the United States from Wales around 1840 where he became an officer with the New York Police Department. It was during this time that he became acquainted with John Morrissey while he was an immigrant runner and later joined him as a "slugger" for Tammany Hall.

He soon became involved in violent fighting against the many nativist organizations of the period, in particular, the Bowery Boys. In January 1855, Baker and Jim Turner entered Platt's Hall and became involved in a verbal altercation with prizefighter Tom Hyer "calling the fighter vile names". The argument escalated until Turner drew his pistol and shot Hyer in the neck. Hyer fired back but missed hitting the wall instead. Putting away his weapon, Hyer attacked his assailants and dragged Baker out into the street but the fight came to an end when a police officer arrived. The fight was broken up, but no charges were brought against the three.

== Murder of William Poole ==
On the night of February 25, 1855, Baker entered the Stanwix Hall saloon with Jim Turner and Paudeen McLaughlin to confront Poole, the latter having threatened Morrissey with a gun during an argument only hours before. Walking up to Poole, Baker spat in his face and then pulled a Colt revolver but accidentally shot himself in the arm as he stepped back to draw the weapon. Dropping to the floor, he did manage to fire a second shot hitting Poole in the leg and similarly incapacitating him. Both men eventually got up from the floor, however Baker managed to get to Poole first and pistol whipped him back to the ground. Baker then shot Poole twice, once in the stomach and the second in his chest, and left the saloon.

A second version according to retired police chief George W. Walling, Turner and McLaughlin had a more active role in the fight. It was McLaughlin, he claimed, who challenged Poole to a fight spitting in his face each time he refused. All three were reportedly drunk, Baker having recently been dismissed from the NYPD, and the still sober Poole was dismissive towards his taunts but offered $100 that he could beat any of the three men. Turner then pulled out a pistol to fire at Poole, using the hollow of his left arm as a rest, but instead shot himself in the arm. He then fired the second shot that hit Poole in the leg. Poole then staggered towards Baker who drew his own revolver and shot him twice before leaving the bar.

== Capture and trial ==
By the time Poole died two weeks later, a massive search for Baker took place. Morrissey and Dan Kerrigan were accused as accessories to the murder, the latter suspected of helping Baker escape the city, but neither man was ever indicted.

Baker hid out in New Jersey for a time before fleeing the country altogether. Authorities managed to catch up to Baker, using the clipper yacht Grapeshot provided by George Law, and took him into custody less than 100 miles west of the Canary Islands; another version claims that he was captured after arriving at Tenerife with the police having arrived two hours ahead of Baker. Brought back to New York, Baker stood trial and twice appeared before the state supreme court before his acquittal by a jury split between six in favor of acquittal and six in favor of a manslaughter conviction.
