= Pooles Island =

Island in Harford County, Maryland, United States

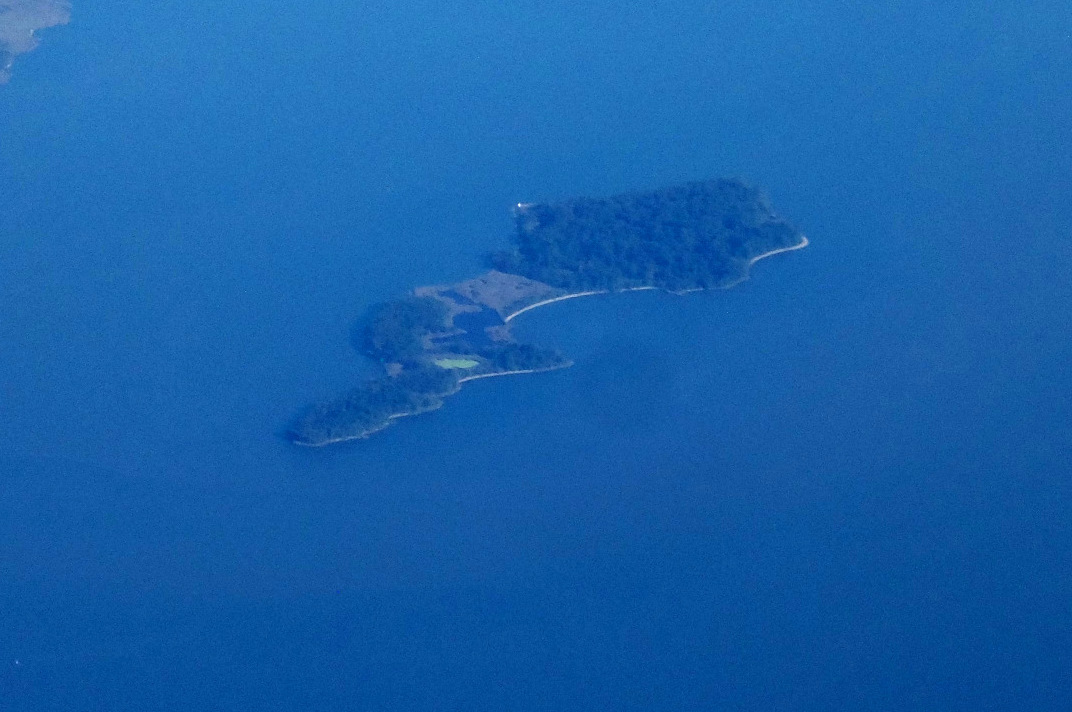
- Pooles Island in 2020
- Interactive map of Pooles Island

Geography
- Location: Chesapeake Bay
- Coordinates: 39°17′07″N 76°15′57″W
- Length: 1.5 km (0.93 mi)

Administration
- United States
- State: Maryland

Demographics
- Population: 0 (2020)

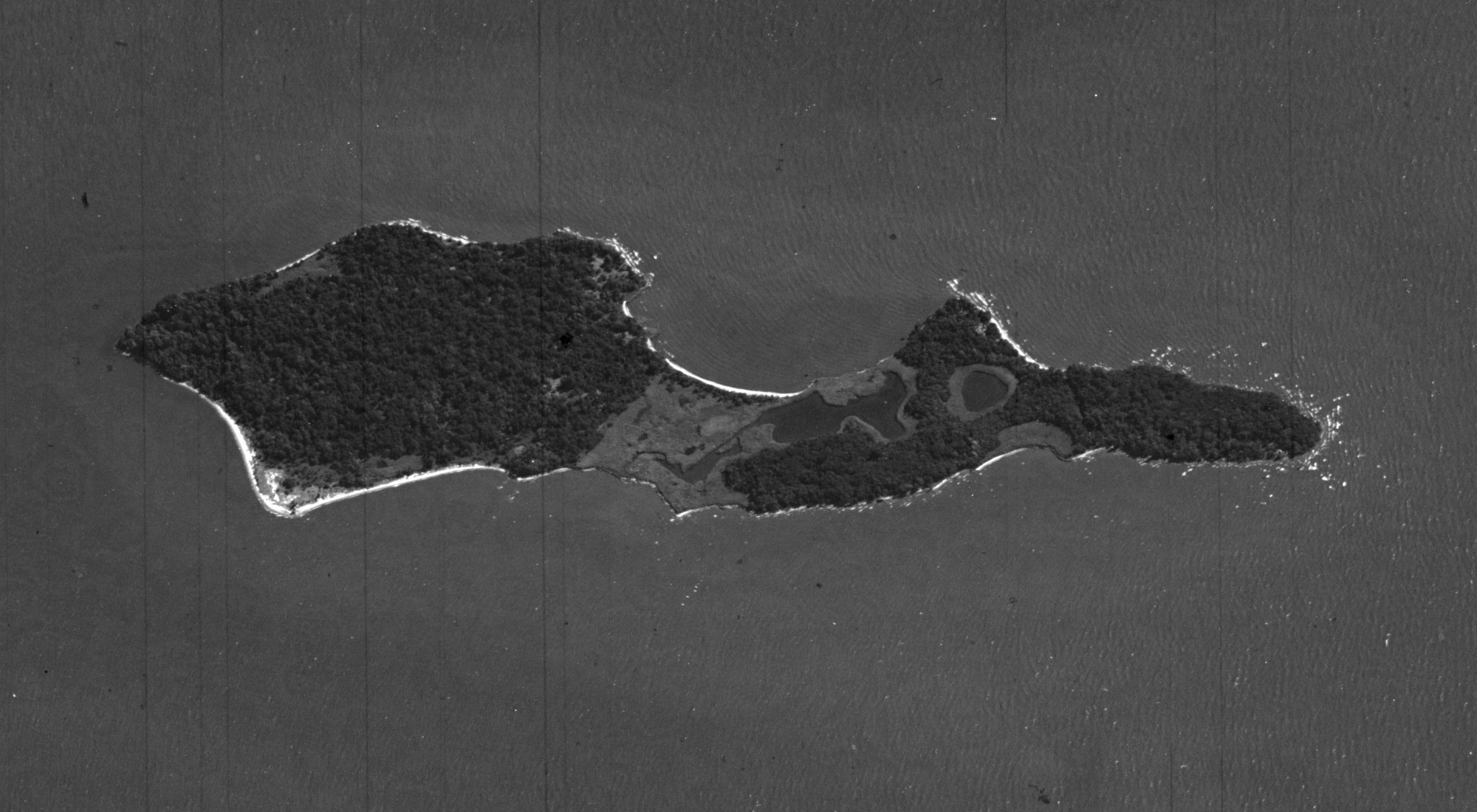
Oblique view of Pooles Island in 1984. North at lower left.

Pooles Island is a small island located on the Chesapeake Bay, part of Harford County, Maryland. It is southeast of the southern tip of Gunpowder Neck. The Pooles Island Light was built on it. Pooles Island was used for bombing practice from 1918 through the 1960s as part of Aberdeen Proving Ground. Access to the island is prohibited due to unexploded ordnance.

Pooles Island was first occupied by Native Americans. The shell middens on the island were evidence of their presence. It was first sighted by Europeans in 1608 when Captain John Smith explored the Chesapeake. The island was originally known as "Powells Island" and was named for Nathaniel Powell, one of Smith's companions. Maps used several spellings during the 19th century; since 1892, it has been spelled "Pooles Island".

In February 1855, brothers Capt. Elijah Williams, 24, and Capt. James Williams, 26, died in a snowstorm near Pooles Island. Their bodies reportedly washed ashore and were buried on the island by the lighthouse keeper; their graves were later relocated near the lighthouse.
