= William Poole =

American boxer and gang leader (1821–1855)

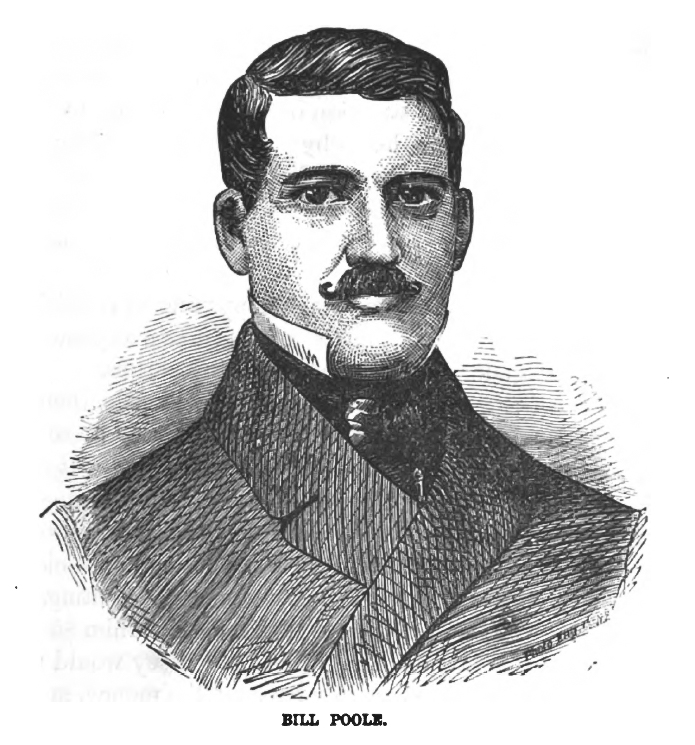
- An 1888 engraving of Poole
- Born: July 24, 1821; Sussex County, New Jersey, United States
- Died: March 8, 1855 (aged 33); Manhattan, New York
- Cause of death: Murder by gunshot
- Resting place: Green-Wood Cemetery, Kings County, New York
- Other name: Bill the Butcher
- Occupations: Butcher, fireman, criminal gang leader, politician
- Known for: Nativism, was a pugilist and leader of the Bowery Boys, a street gang of Know Nothings and volunteer firemen; murdered by supporters of his political rival, John Morrissey of Tammany Hall

Washington Street Gang
- Founded by: William "Bill the Butcher" Poole
- Founding location: Washington Market, Manhattan
- Years active: 1840s
- Territory: Washington Market, Manhattan
- Ethnicity: American
- Membership (est.): ?
- Criminal activities: ?

Bowery Boys
- Founded by: William "Bill the Butcher" Poole
- Founding location: Bowery, Manhattan, New York City
- Years active: Mid-19th century
- Territory: Bowery, Manhattan, New York City
- Ethnicity: Non-Irish, European American
- Membership (est.): ?
- Criminal activities: ?
- Rivals: Dead Rabbits, Plug Uglies

The Funeral of Poole from The NY Times, March 12, 1855
00:06:12

William Poole (July 24, 1821 – March 8, 1855), also known as Bill the Butcher, was the leader of the Washington Street Gang, which later became known as the Bowery Boys gang. He was a local leader of the Know Nothing political movement in mid-19th-century New York City.

== Early life ==
Poole was born in Sussex County, New Jersey, into an Old Stock family of English descent. In 1832, his family moved to Manhattan in New York City, to open a butcher shop in Washington Market. Poole became skilled in his father's trade and eventually took over the family store. In the 1840s, he worked with the Howard (Red Rover) Volunteer Fire Engine Company #34, on Hudson and Christopher Streets, and started the Washington Street Gang, which later became the Bowery Boys. During this period in New York, fires were a problem. Volunteer fire groups, such as the one Poole was in, were important for keeping fires under control. These firefighting groups were closely tied to street gangs and were seen as a public service provided by those groups. Over the years, gangs were in an ongoing rivalry over who would be the one to extinguish the fire. A common strategy the Bowery Boys used was to ensure that other fire engine companies could not put out the fires. Upon hearing the alarm sound indicating that a fire had broken out, a member of the Bowery Boys would find the nearest fire hydrant. He would then flip an empty barrel over onto the hydrant so it could not be seen or used. The Bowery Boys would sit on the barrel until their own fire engine arrived. Fights over the hydrants would break out, and often the Bowery Boys had no time to actually extinguish the fire.

== Personality ==
William Poole was a large man for the time. He weighed over two hundred pounds and was about six feet tall. He was known for his brutal boxing style: "He was well known as being a notoriously dirty fighter, not averse to biting off noses, gouging out eyeballs, or beating a man to jelly." He fought in many fights that were considered illegal due to the brutality of bare-knuckle boxing. He was also a known skilled knife fighter, as a result of his profession as a butcher. Poole was a known gambler and a heavy drinker. He closed his family's butchery business in the 1850s and opened a drinking saloon, known as the "Bank Exchange".

== Street gangs ==
Street gangs in New York were fluid in their membership and name as they merged and found new leaders. The most well-known of these was the Bowery Boys, which Poole formed from his own Washington Street gang and a collection of many other street gangs. Other key gangs incorporated into the Bowery Boys were the American Guards, Atlantic Guards, True Blue Americans, and the Order of the Star-Spangled Guard. These gangs were composed of nativist White Anglo-Saxon Protestants who were opposed to the enfranchisement of the growing number of Irish Catholic refugees from the Great Famine. Street gangs, like the Bowery Boys, "were bound by ethnic ties or nativist belief; the members tended to be deeply patriotic, and a common thread was the belief that the country was pretty well full, so that newcomers were not welcomed." Poole's gang was located near to the Five Points neighborhood, where many recent Irish Catholic immigrants settled. Five Points was located in what is now Chinatown in Lower Manhattan. Waves of Irish- and German-Americans moved into the Five Points as their first stop on the way to the American dream. In response to attacks by Poole and his followers, the Irish created their own street gangs. The Dead Rabbits were an Irish-membership gang and the biggest rival of Poole's Bowery Boys. Much of the hatred between the two gangs was based on racial and religious differences. "For years the Bowery Boys and the Dead Rabbits waged a bitter feud, and a week seldom passed in which they did not come to blows, either along the Bowery, or in the Five Points section." Both gangs were primarily brawlers and street fighters, another reason why William Poole was a well-known fighter, and most of their battling was done in open spaces. Poole made many alliances with other street gangs that supported his ideology.

== Political views ==
William Poole detested the Democratic Party's local political machine, Tammany Hall, because it accepted immigrants as members. Tammany Hall-affiliated street gangs also protected Irish Catholics from Poole's Bowery Boys, whom he sent to terrorize immigrants and keep them from registering to vote. Poole and the Bowery Boys were a de facto extension of the Know Nothings, a nativist and militantly anti-Catholic political party. According to the New Orleans True Delta, the purpose of the Know Nothings was "twofold – part religious, part political; and the ends aimed at the disenfranchisement of adopted citizens, and their exclusion from office, and perpetual war upon the Catholic religion." Originally, the Know Nothings were known as the Native American Party, but changed their name in 1855. Members of the Know Nothing Party had to "be a native-born citizen, of native-born parents, and not of the Catholic religion". The goal was to organize native White Anglo-Saxon Protestants to defend and preserve their religion and control of American politics from enfranchised Catholics, immigrants and their descendants.

Poole was nominated by the Whig Party in April 1848 as a candidate for alderman, representing the Sixth Ward. Poole fared poorly in the general election, receiving only 199 votes and tying for last place with his ticket-mate against four other candidates.

In February 1853, Poole was appointed to represent the Sixth Ward on the New York City Board of Education.

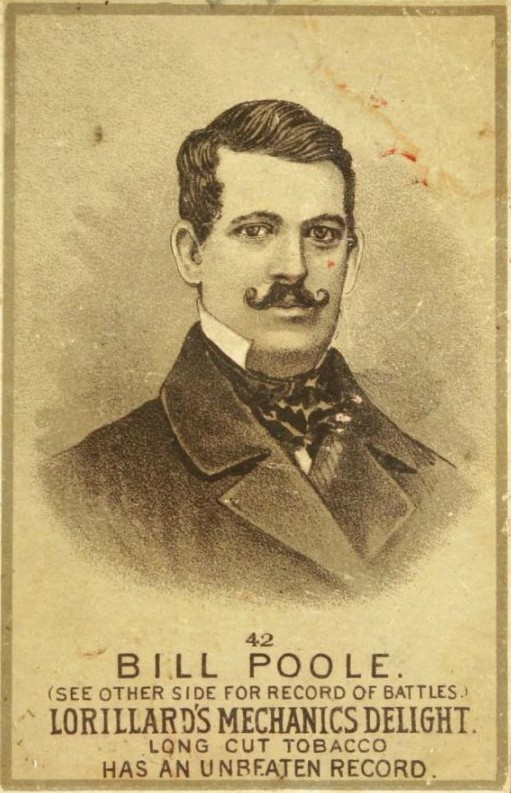
Bill Poole portrait from a tobacco company boxer profile card, circa late 1880s

== Attack at Florence's Hotel ==
As a well-known gang leader and pugilist, Poole was frequently involved in fights, brawls, and other confrontations. The New York Daily Times reported the following on October 23, 1851:

A Brutal Outrage in Broadway. We learn that at an early hour yesterday morning, two noted pugilists entered Florence's Hotel, corner of Broadway and Howard Street, and without any provocation seized the bar-keeper and beat his face to a jelly. It appears that Thomas Hyer, William Poole, and several others entered the above hotel, and while one of the party held Charles Owens (the bar-keeper) by the hair of his head, another of the gang beat him in the face to such an extent that his left eye was completely ruined and the flesh of his cheek mangled in the most shocking manner. After thus accomplishing the heartless act, all of them made an effort to find Mr. John Florence, the proprietor of the hotel, with a view of serving him in the same manner, but not succeeding in their latter design, they found the hat of Mr. Florence and wantonly cut it into strips, and trampled it under their feet. The desperadoes then left the house, and in the meantime Mr. Owens was placed under medical attendance, and in the course of a short time he proceeded to the Jefferson Market Police, in company with Mr. Florence, where they made their affidavits respecting the inhuman outrage, upon which Justice Blakeley issued his warrants for Hyer, Poole, and such of the others who were concerned in the affair, and the same were placed in the hands of officer Baldwin for service. Since the above was written, we have been reliably informed that the affray originated from the fact of the barkeeper having refused them drinks, after they had been furnished with them twice in succession.

== Dispute with John Morrissey ==
Poole's arch-rival John Morrissey was an Irish immigrant and worked for the political machine at Tammany Hall. Morrissey was also a popular bare-knuckle boxer and challenged Poole to a match. Though the two men were of differing ethnic backgrounds and political parties, the initial grounds for their dispute may have arisen from an earlier bet by Poole on a boxing match at Boston Corners on October 12, 1853, in which Poole had placed his bet on Morrissey's opponent, "Yankee Sullivan". The results of the boxing match were disputed—Sullivan beat Morrisey but was then distracted into leaving the ring by Morrisey's friends and the referee announced Morrisey winner for being in the ring—and Poole was against Morrissey being paid. In 1854, a fight was arranged between Morrissey and Poole, which Poole won.

=== Shooting and death ===
Morrissey plotted revenge and on February 25, 1855, recently-fired NYPD patrolman Lewis Baker and Jim Turner, who were allegedly acting as enforcers for Morrissey, shot Poole in the leg and chest at Stanwix Hall, a bar on Broadway near Prince, at that time a center of the city's nightlife. The New York Daily Times reported on February 26, 1855, the following:

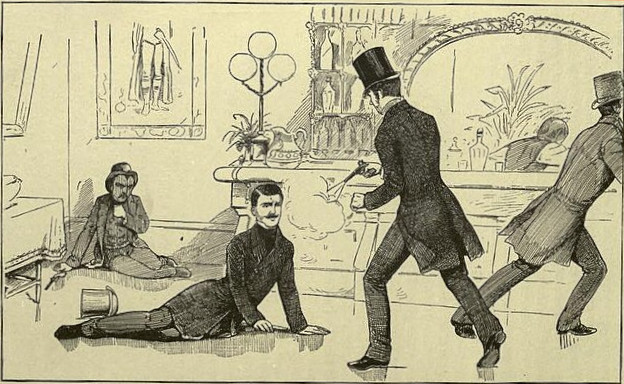
Illustration of Bill Poole's murder in George W. Walling's "Recollections of a New York Chief of Police" (1887).

Terrible Shooting Affray in Broadway – Bill Poole Fatally Wounded – The Morrissey and Poole Feud – Renewal of Hostilities – Several Persons Severely Wounded. Broadway, in the vicinity of Prince and Houston Streets, was the scene of an exciting shooting affair about 1 o'clock yesterday morning, which is but a repetition of a similar occurrence that transpired a few weeks ago under Wallack's Theatre between Tom Hyer, Lewis Baker, Jim Turner and several other noted pugilists... View Full Article at Wikisource

Several days after the shooting, on March 8, 1855, Poole died in his home on Christopher Street at the age of 33. Poole was survived by his wife and son, Charles Poole. The war between Poole and Morrissey had been very public, and The New York Times covered the events of Stanwix Hall almost every day for a month. One local newsman reported Poole's last words were, "Good-bye, boys; I die a true American," although the New York Evening Post, quoting an unnamed man who was at Poole's bedside when he died, reported that his last words named Morrissey as his killer. He was buried on March 11, 1855, in Brooklyn's Green-Wood Cemetery with thousands of spectators.

Lewis Baker fled New York City, with the help of Daniel Kerrigan, a twenty-four-year-old 1853 Democratic nominee for councilman. Kerrigan, an Irish-American, expressed sympathy for Baker. The Times called Kerrigan "one of the principal accessories to the murder of Poole and the flight of Baker." Facing an international manhunt organized by Poole's patrons in the Know Nothing Party, Baker boarded the Jewett and sailed for the Canary Islands. He was intercepted, however, on the high seas on April 17, 1855. Baker was arrested and returned to New York City to be tried for the murder of William Poole. All three trials, however, ended with a hung jury and Baker ultimately walked away a free man. Morrissey went on to open up several Irish pubs and accumulated a fortune of $1.5 million. He later served two terms as a New York state senator and two more terms in the U.S. House of Representatives. Morrissey died in 1878 and lies buried in a Roman Catholic cemetery in his childhood hometown of Troy, New York.

== In popular culture ==
Daniel Day-Lewis played a heavily fictionalized version of Bill the Butcher, renamed William Cutting, in the 2002 Martin Scorsese film Gangs of New York. Day-Lewis received an Academy Award for Best Actor nomination for his performance.

The chief differences between the historical Poole and the cinematic "Butcher" are that, while Poole died before the Civil War, the fictional character is still alive and leading his street gang in 1862, ultimately dying in the film in a street battle instead of being mortally shot at Stanwix Hall. Day-Lewis's Cutting reveals to Leonardo DiCaprio's character that he is 47 years old, making him born in 1815 – six years earlier than Poole – and claimed his father was killed by the British at the Battle of Lundy's Lane, implying that he died before Bill was born.

== See also ==
- Dead Rabbits riot
