= John Fox (New York politician) =

American politician

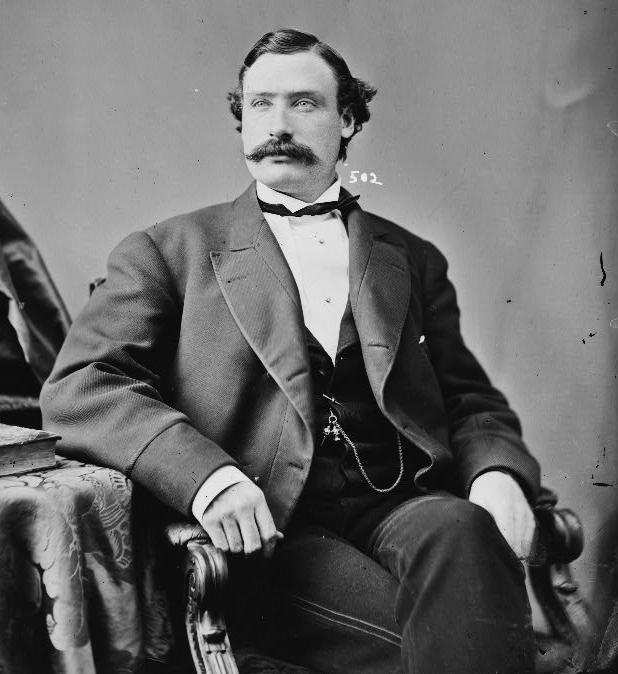

Member of the U.S. House of Representatives from New York's 4th district
- In office March 4, 1867 – March 3, 1871
- Preceded by: Morgan Jones
- Succeeded by: Robert B. Roosevelt

Member of the New York Senate from the 4th district
- In office January 1, 1874 – December 31, 1875
- Preceded by: William M. Tweed
- Succeeded by: John Morrissey

Personal details
- Born: June 30, 1835 Fredericton, New Brunswick Colony, British Canada
- Died: January 17, 1914 (aged 78) New York City, New York, U.S.
- Party: Democratic
- Profession: Politician, Mechanic, Merchant

John Fox (June 30, 1835 – January 17, 1914) was an American mechanic, merchant and politician from New York. He served two terms in the United States House of Representatives from 1867 to 1871.

== Life ==
Born to Irish emigrants in Fredericton in the New Brunswick Colony in British Canada, Fox immigrated to the United States with his parents in 1840, settling in New York City, New York. He attended public schools as a child, engaged in mechanical pursuits and was employed as a master block maker in the Brooklyn Navy Yard in 1857. He was a member of the New York City Council, and was a Supervisor of New York County in 1863 and 1864.

=== Congress ===
Fox was elected as a Democrat to the 40th and 41st United States Congresses, holding office from March 4, 1867, to March 3, 1871. He was a member of the New York State Senate (4th D.) in 1874 and 1875.

=== Later career and death ===
He was president of the National Democratic Club from 1894 to 1910 and engaged in business as an iron merchant.

He died in New York City on January 17, 1914 from pneumonia, and was buried at the Calvary Cemetery in Woodside, Queens.

U.S. House of Representatives
Preceded by Morgan Jones	Member of the U.S. House of Representatives from New York's 4th congressional district 1867–1871	Succeeded by Robert B. Roosevelt
New York State Senate
Preceded by William M. Tweed	New York State Senate; 4th District; 1874–1875	Succeeded by John Morrissey
