= James O'Brien (U.S. congressman) =

Irish-American politician and U.S. Representative (1841–1907)

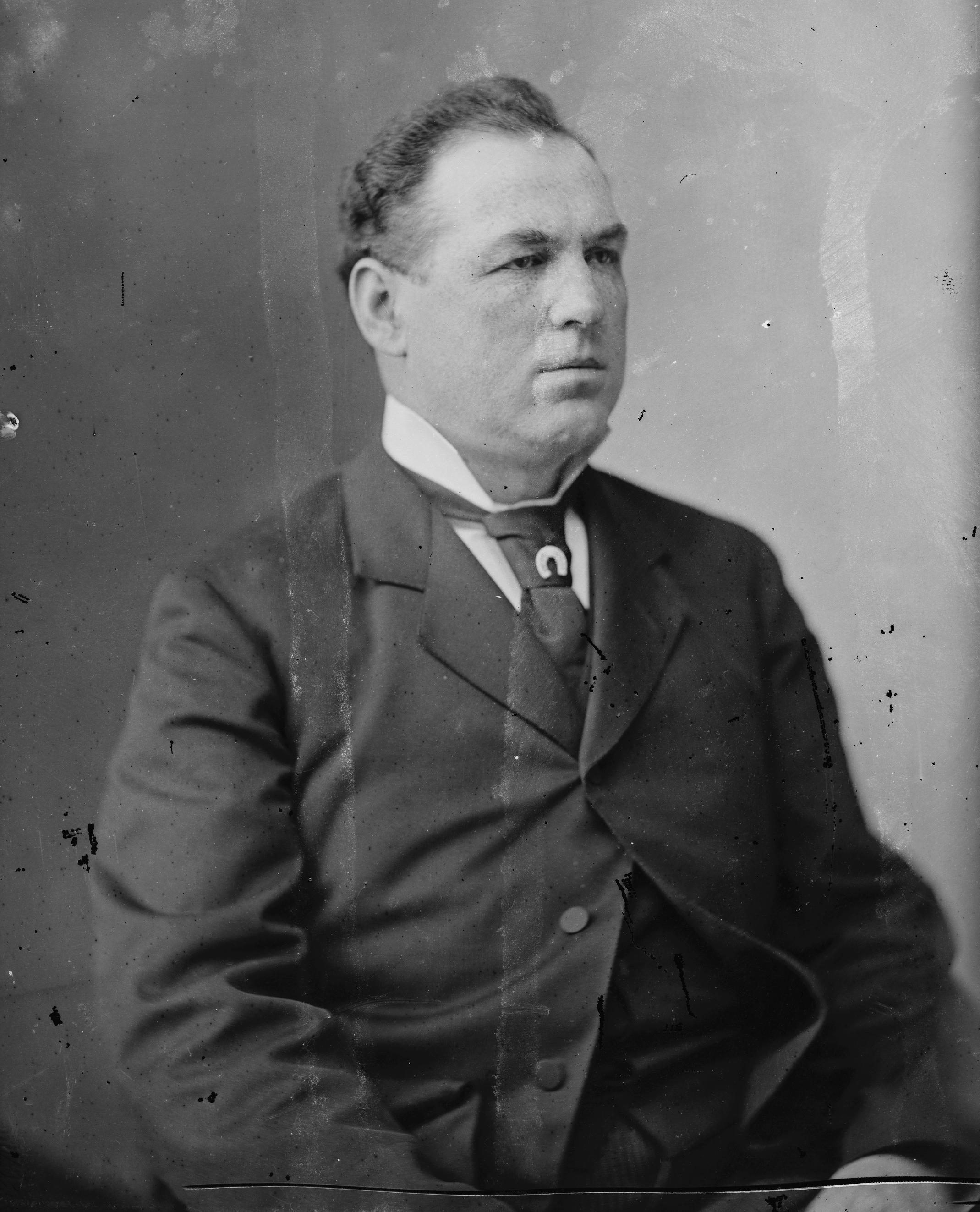
- O'Brien, c. 1860s–1870s

Member of the U.S. House of Representatives from New York's 10th district
- In office March 4, 1879 – March 3, 1881
- Preceded by: Abram Hewitt
- Succeeded by: Abram Hewitt

Member of the New York Senate from the 7th district
- In office 1872–1873
- Preceded by: John J. Bradley
- Succeeded by: Thomas A. Ledwith

Sheriff of New York County
- In office 1867–1867

Member of the New York City Board of Aldermen
- In office 1864–1866

Personal details
- Born: March 13, 1841 King's County, Ireland
- Died: March 5, 1907 (aged 65) Manhattan, New York City, New York, U.S.
- Resting place: Calvary Cemetery, Queens, New York City
- Party: Independent Democrat (1879–1881); Democratic
- Occupation: Politician, stock broker

James O'Brien (March 13, 1841 – March 5, 1907) was an Irish-American politician and U.S. Representative from New York, serving from 1879 to 1881. He was a key figure in exposing the corruption of the Tweed Ring of Tammany Hall.

== Early life ==
O'Brien was born on March 13, 1841, in King's County (now County Offaly), Ireland. He attended the common schools and then immigrated to the United States in 1861.

== Career ==
O'Brien served as alderman of New York City in 1864 and 1866, then became Sheriff of New York County in 1867.

=== Role in exposing the Tweed Ring ===
O'Brien directly contributed to the downfall of the Tweed Ring of Tammany Hall by providing city financial accounts to the New York Times in 1871. James Watson, who was a county auditor in Comptroller Dick Connolly's office and who also held and recorded the ring's books, died a week after his head was smashed by a horse in a sleigh accident on January 21, 1871. Although Tweed guarded Watson's estate in the week prior to Watson's death, and although another ring member attempted to destroy Watson's records, a replacement auditor, Matthew O'Rourke, associated with the former sheriff James O'Brien, provided city financial accounts to O'Brien, who then forwarded the accounts to the New York Times. The New York Times, at that time the only Republican-associated paper in the city, was then able to reinforce stories they had previously published against the ring.

=== State Senate ===
O'Brien served in the New York State Senate (7th District) in 1872 and 1873, during which time he founded the Apollo Hall Democracy.

He was an unsuccessful candidate for mayor of New York City in 1873 and an unsuccessful candidate for election in 1874 to the Forty-fourth Congress.

Richard Croker was charged with the murder of John McKenna, a lieutenant of James O'Brien, during a fight on election day of 1874 with O'Brien's rival political group. O'Brien was running for Congress against the Tammany-backed Abram S. Hewitt. John Kelly, the new Tammany Hall boss, attended the trial and Croker was freed after the jury was undecided.

=== U.S. Congress ===
O'Brien was elected as an Independent Democrat to the Forty-sixth Congress (March 4, 1879 – March 3, 1881). He was an unsuccessful candidate for renomination in 1880.

=== Later career ===
After leaving Congress, O'Brien worked as a stock broker until his death.

== Death ==
O'Brien died on March 5, 1907, in Manhattan at the age of 65. He was buried in Calvary Cemetery in Queens.

New York State Senate
Preceded by John J. Bradley	New York State Senate; 7th District; 1872–1873	Succeeded by Thomas A. Ledwith
U.S. House of Representatives
Preceded by Abram Hewitt	Member of the U.S. House of Representatives from New York's 10th congressional district 1879–1881	Succeeded by Abram Hewitt
