= Thomas A. Ledwith =

American lawyer, politician, and judge (1840–1898)

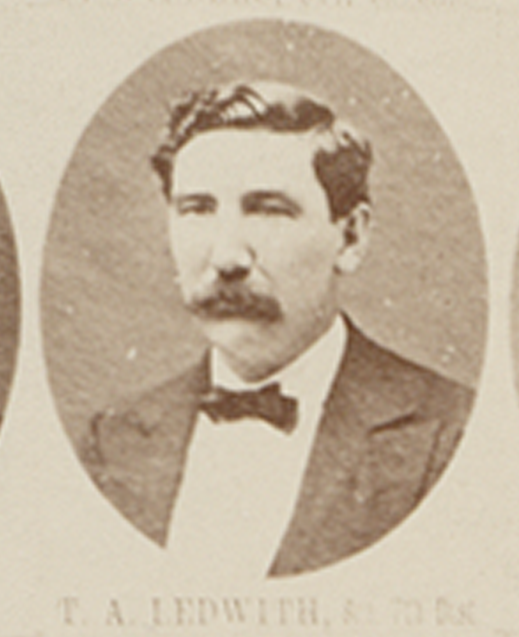
- Ledwith, about 1874

Member of the New York Senate from the 7th district
- In office 1874–1875
- Preceded by: James O'Brien
- Succeeded by: James W. Gerard

Member of the New York State Assembly from the New York County, 11th district
- In office 1863–1863
- Preceded by: Noah A. Childs
- Succeeded by: Carolan O'Brien Bryant

New York City Police Justice, 8th District
- Incumbent
- Assumed office 1863

Personal details
- Born: February 14, 1840 New York City, New York, U.S.
- Died: April 1, 1898 (aged 58) New York City, New York, U.S.
- Resting place: Calvary Cemetery, Woodside, Queens
- Party: Democratic
- Spouse: Agnes McGowan (m. 1866; died 1868)
- Children: 1
- Education: St. Francis Xavier College
- Occupation: Lawyer, politician, judge

Thomas A. Ledwith (February 14, 1840 – April 1, 1898) was an American lawyer, politician, and judge from New York. He served in the New York State Assembly in 1863 and in the New York State Senate from 1874 to 1875.

== Early life and education ==
Ledwith was born on February 14, 1840, in New York City. He graduated from St. Francis Xavier College in 1856. He then studied law, was admitted to the bar in 1861, and practiced in New York City.

== Political and judicial career ==
Ledwith was a member of the New York State Assembly (New York County, 11th District) in 1863.

He was elected a New York City Police Justice (8th District) in 1863 and re-elected in 1869.

In 1870, he ran for Mayor of New York City but was defeated by Tammany Hall candidate A. Oakey Hall.

In 1871, he ran unsuccessfully for the New York Supreme Court (1st District).

He was a member of the New York State Senate (7th District) in 1874 and 1875.

== Personal life ==
Ledwith married Agnes McGowan on April 11, 1866. She was born on March 1, 1843, in New York City and died on August 6, 1868, in New York City. They had one son, Joseph Ledwith (June 26, 1868 – December 27, 1929). Joseph married Lucy A. Donahue (November 1853 – January 28, 1941), and they had three children: Thomas Augustine, Mary, and Frances.

== Death ==
Ledwith died on April 1, 1898, at his home at 28 West 72nd Street in New York City. He was buried at Calvary Cemetery in Woodside, Queens.

New York State Assembly
Preceded by Noah A. Childs	New York State Assembly; New York County, 11th District; 1863	Succeeded by Carolan O'Brien Bryant
New York State Senate
Preceded by James O'Brien	New York State Senate; 7th District; 1874–1875	Succeeded by James W. Gerard
