= James W. Gerard Jr. =

American lawyer, Commissioner of Education, and New York State Senator (1823–1900)

Commissioner of Education of the State of New York

Member of the New York Senate from the 7th district
- In office 1876–1877
- Preceded by: Thomas A. Ledwith
- Succeeded by: John Morrissey

Personal details
- Born: James Watson Gerard Jr. 1823 New York City, New York, U.S.
- Died: 1900 (aged 76–77)
- Party: Democratic
- Spouse: Jenny J. Angel
- Children: 3, including James Watson Gerard III
- Education: Columbia College (1843)
- Occupation: Lawyer, politician, educator

James Watson Gerard Jr. (1823 – 1900) was an American lawyer, Commissioner of Education of the State of New York, and a member of the New York State Senate. He was the son of prominent lawyer and reformer James Watson Gerard Sr. (1794–1874) and the father of diplomat James Watson Gerard III (1867–1951), who served as the United States Ambassador to Germany from 1913 to 1917.

== Early life and education ==
Gerard was born in 1823 in New York City, the son of James Watson Gerard Sr. and Eliza Sumner. His mother was the daughter of Increase Sumner, who had served as Governor of Massachusetts and Chief Justice of the Massachusetts Supreme Judicial Court.

He followed his father's footsteps and graduated from Columbia College in 1843. After completing his education, he served as a United States attaché in London before entering his father's law firm, Platt, Gerard & Buckley.

== Career ==
Gerard practiced law in New York City, specializing in real estate and property law. He also served as Commissioner of Education of the State of New York and as Inspector of Public Schools.

=== State Senate ===
In 1875, Gerard was elected to the New York State Senate as a Democrat, representing the 7th District. He served in the 99th (1876) and 100th (1877) sessions. His election was unsuccessfully contested by Republican William Laimbeer Jr..

Gerard succeeded Thomas A. Ledwith in the Senate and was succeeded by John Morrissey in 1878.

He was also an author, writing several books on history, the most important being The Peace of Utrecht.

== Personal life ==
On October 31, 1866, Gerard married Jenny J. Angel, the daughter of former Minister to Sweden Benjamin F. Angel and a direct descendant of Elder William Brewster, who arrived on the Mayflower. They had three children: James Watson (who became the ambassador to Germany), Sumner, and Julian Monroe.

Gerard was a member of several prominent clubs, including the Players, Tuxedo, St. Nicholas Society, and Union Clubs.

He died in 1900.

== Legacy ==
Gerard created a scrapbook containing personal correspondence, a journal from an 1863 trip to Europe, writings and speeches by his father on crime and juvenile delinquency, and obituaries and tributes on his father's death in 1874. The scrapbook is held by the New York Public Library as part of its Manuscripts and Archives Division.

His son, James Watson Gerard III, became a prominent lawyer, diplomat, and United States Ambassador to Germany from 1913 to 1917.
