= Yankee Sullivan =

Irish boxer

Personal information
- Nicknames: Frank Murray; James Sullivan
- Nationality: Irish; Settled in America by late 1841; Never returned to England
- Born: James Ambrose; 10 March 1811 Bandon, County Cork, Ireland
- Died: 31 May 1856 (aged 45) San Francisco, California
- Height: 5 ft 10 in (1.78 m); Varies downward slightly in records
- Weight: 160 lb (73 kg), middleweight

Boxing career
- Stance: Orthodox; Long reach, right handed Used London Prize Ring Rules

Boxing record
- Total fights: 14 * professional bouts only
- Wins: 12
- Losses: 2

Yankee Sullivan (born James Ambrose; c. 10 March 1811 – 31 May 1856), also known as Frank Murray and James Sullivan, was a bare-knuckle fighter and boxer. He claimed the American bare knuckle heavyweight champion from 1851 to 12 October 1853. When Tom Hyer vacated his title, he laid claim to it, though many modern boxing historians dispute his claim. He lost any claim to the title after losing a fight to John Morrissey.

== Early life ==
James Ambrose was born in Bandon, County Cork, Ireland, in 1811, but grew up in London's East End, becoming a prizefighter at an early age. After being sentenced to twenty years jail, he was sent to a penal colony in Australia to serve his time. After serving eight years building roads, he was granted a ticket of leave and settled in The Rocks, Sydney, Australia, then considered the most dangerous waterfront in the world.

On 2 February 1841, Sullivan defeated Hammer Lane in Crookham Common for the Middleweight Championship of England in a nineteen round bout, taking 34 minutes. After first arriving in America, Sullivan fought Vincent Hammond on 2 September 1841 at League Island near Philadelphia, winning in eight short rounds which took a total of only ten minutes. Many Irish communities began to take note of their new champion.

After his arrival in America, in late 1841, Sullivan gained a reputation as both a prizefighter and a political enforcer, primarily for the Irish factions associated with Tammany Hall, the corrupt political machine. He was sentenced to two years in state prison for his involvement in the promotion of a fight between Christopher Lilly and Thomas McCoy, which resulted in the death of McCoy on 13 September 1842. He received a pardon after two months on the condition that two men put up two hundred dollars, and that he agree not to fight for two years. During his time in New York he was the owner of a saloon known as the Sawdust House on New York City's Division Street, within walking distance of Tom Hyer's bar on Park Row.

Sullivan defeated Robert Caunt, one of his best known opponents, in eight rounds and twelve minutes at Harper's Ferry, West Virginia. The full contract for the fight between Sullivan and Hyer was signed by both parties on 7 August 1848 at New York's Ford's tavern, though the fight did not take place until six months later.

== Championship bout vs. Tom Hyer, 1849 ==
=== Factions behind the fight ===
Thomas Hyer, 1849

Sullivan met Tom Hyer, a native New Yorker of Dutch heritage, at a fine restaurant at the corner of New York's Broadway and Park Place, early in 1849. Sullivan had planned to meet him there for a brawl, possibly for publicity, but according to most newspapers of the day, with the clear intent of doing him harm. Hyer was reported to have won the brief encounter, and then loaded a pistol to protect himself from Sullivan's soon to arrive supporters. They arrived shortly after, but the police intervened and prevented any bloodshed. Sullivan had acted as a second to Country McClosky in his recent loss to Hyer, and had hoped to avenge McClosky by defeating Hyer. According to one source, Sullivan was a bit of a ruffian and petty criminal when he was boxing in London during his early fighting days, and was sent to a British penal colony in Australia to serve time. His battle with Hyer was more than a prize fight. It was a statement by two warring factions in New York, in short "a proxy battle between anti-immigrant nativists represented by Hyer and his Bowery Boys gang, and the Irish immigrants backed by Tammany Hall, and represented by Sullivan and his followers." As noted by Chris Klein, "Boxing was closely involved with politics in America after the Civil War, and fighters forged close ties with corrupt urban political machines that relied on muscle (and often gangs) to help their candidates win elections". Opposing political factions often made up gangs and expressed their animosity using warfare in the streets, on occasion taking over balloting places to secure their candidates would win.

=== Maryland sends militia to stop the fight ===
Seeking to stop Sullivan and Hyer from fighting, George Richardson, the Attorney General of Maryland, where boxing was banned, sent two companies of state militia to Pooles Island, where the fight was originally intended to take place, but the boxers moved the bout East to Still Pond heights. Though 300 souls had first steamed to Pooles' to observe the fight, only 200 or so spectators were said to attend the bout, as others may have been frightened of arrest by the Maryland militia, as a cornerman for Sullivan and George Thompson, the trainer for Hyer had earlier spent a brief stay in jail after being arrested on Poole's Island.

Hyer before Sullivan bout with flag sash, long left extended

According to the Police Gazette, and other sources Hyer had nearly a four inch height advantage, and as much as a thirty pound advantage in weight over Sullivan, a disparity that would likely have prevented their being matched today. Hyer's advantage in reach gave him another important edge in the fight. On 7 February 1849, Hyer finally defeated Sullivan in a scorching battle that commenced around 4:00 pm. The match went 16 rounds at Still Pond Creek, a cold and snowy outdoor arena on the East Maryland shore, ten miles below Poole's Island where the fight was originally planned. The close betting gave the edge to Sullivan, 100 to 89. Despite his being the smaller man, Sullivan was undefeated in eight fights, primarily in Australia and England, and had claimed the Middleweight championship of England.

=== Details of the fight with Hyer ===
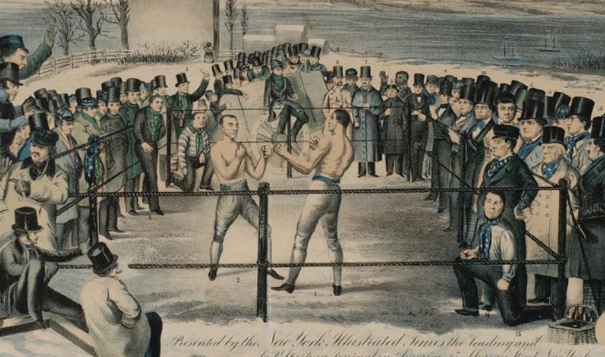
From Painting of Sullivan fight, 1849, Sullivan left, Chesapeake Bay behind

Sullivan hoped to use what he believed to be an advantage in grappling, to weaken the larger Hyer by way of hard throws, legal in London Prize Ring Rules, but when this failed, Hyer's superior reach and height allowed him to dominate Sullivan. Several accounts do report that Sullivan attempted to throw Hyer in the early match with some success, and credited him with the first three. As the fight progressed, Sullivan was down in the fourth and again in the sixth, but arose. Within 17 minutes of the start of the bout, Sullivan was badly hurt, and had had his right eye lanced to prevent it from swelling shut. By the thirteenth round, Sullivan was flagging badly, taking almost two blows to each one he weakly delivered to Hyer. Sullivan's right arm was wrenched in the 15th.

According to the Milwaukee Sentinel, writing the day after the fight, once Sullivan was exhausted, Hyer caught his head under his arm before he could fall in the 15th, and punched him repeatedly. This attack ended the bout, and Sullivan could not return for the 16th. Several telegraphed reports received the day after the fight as well as the detailed written account by the reliable Brooklyn Daily Eagle confirm this account and it appears to be accurate. Published years later, the Police Gazette did not make mention of Hyer holding Sullivan around the head, but did accurately note that the fight ended after Hyer threw Sullivan to the ground at the end of the 15th and fell on top of him. When Hyer stood up, it was clear, Sullivan could not continue. Sullivan, unable to rise at the end, had to be carted off by his seconds.

After being declared the winner, and following the tradition of London Prize Ring Rules, Hyer tore Sullivan's green and white silk banner that represented the colors of Ireland, from its stake by the ring and triumphantly displayed it to the crowd. Hyer's banner, was the American stars and stripes, in some ways representing his alliance with the mildly anti-immigrant Whig Party, which was in alliance with the Know Nothing Party. After the bout, Sullivan was taken to Mt. Hope Hospital where he was treated for his injured arm, badly blackened eyes and a slight skull fracture, but released the following day. The fight lasted 17 minutes, 18 seconds and Hyer won an exceptionally large $10,000 purse in a battle that he dominated. Much of the way back from Chesapeake Bay to New York, Hyer was greeted and cheered by large crowds that lined the streets of cities and towns, for parades of victory. This was a widely publicized boxing match at the time and helped to ignite the sport's popularity, despite the bout being illegal in Maryland, and clearly a brutal affair.

== Claiming heavyweight title, 1851 ==
Following his fight with Sullivan, Hyer temporarily retired to run his New York bar on Park Row and recover from his injuries. Sullivan claimed Hyer's status as a champion in 1851, though not all present day boxing historians recognize his reign as heavyweight champion.

== Loss of title, 1853 ==
John Morrisey, circa 1860

For a purse of $2000, before a crowd of nearly 4,500, on 12 October 1853, Sullivan fought John Morrissey at Boston Corner. Boston Corner was then in Berkshire County, Massachusetts, but out of reach of its authorities, and thus a good location for the illegal match. Sullivan was the dominant fighter for the first fifteen rounds but wore down as the fight progressed, and both fighters had taken punishment by the thirty seventh round. Preserving his strength, Sullivan was far more frequently the first to fall, usually intentionally, to end rounds, which was entirely legal by London Prize Ring Rules. In the earlier rounds, Morrissey clearly took the more severe beating, particularly to his left eye which was nearly closed by the seventh round. In the 37th, Morrissey lifted Sullivan, with his arm around his neck, slightly off the floor against the ropes, when onlookers rushed into the ring in protest. Once onlookers had rushed into the ring, the fight broke down into a brawl involving Sullivan and both fighters' seconds. The referee later declared Morrissey the winner, partly because he refrained from the spectator brawl at the end of the 37th round, though many disputed the referee's decision, believing Sullivan had clearly led the fighting. Morrissey's injuries seemed severe enough that several newspapers outside of the New York area mistakenly reported he had died from them, though he recovered fully in time.

== Move to California and death ==
Sullivan later moved to California, where he found employment as a "shoulder striker" guarding ballot boxes to deter supporters of candidates other than his employer from casting their vote. He was the guard over a ballot box that was tampered with, resulting in the election of James P. Casey to a city office, despite Casey never appearing on the ballot. After Casey gunned down James King of William for exposing his criminal past, the San Francisco Vigilance Movement seized power in the city. On 25 May 1856, the Vigilance Committee arrested Sullivan. A trial was held and Sullivan was sentenced to deportation. While in jail he confessed his involvement in ballot box tampering. After four days in jail, he was found with his wrist slit, apparently having committed suicide, although reports suggested for years afterwards that he had been murdered by Vigilantes or by other individuals who were worried about repercussions should Sullivan confess what he knew about corrupt political figures.

Sullivan was buried at Mission Dolores Cemetery near the southwest corner of 16th Street and Dolores Street in San Francisco on 31 May 1856. He left a wife and child in California, and another wife in New York. Initially buried in an unmarked grave, a grave marker was erected by Tom Malloy two years later. The headstone bears the inscription "Remember not, O Lord, our offenses, nor those of our parents. Neither take thou vengeance of our sins. Thou shalt bring forth my soul out of tribulation and in thy mercy thou shalt destroy mine enemies."

== Selected coverage in newspapers ==
- The New York Times; 5 January 1877. "How The Commodore Whipped 'Yankee' Sullivan. Among the stories told about Commodore Vanderbilt is the following, related by an old and well known resident of Staten Island."
- The New York Times; 30 June 1856. "Yankee Sullivan No More. Yankee Sullivan has gone to his last account. His last round is fought. His name passes away from among the ranks of the active 'Fancy.' Like many of the 'fighting men,' Sullivan had enough in him to make a smart man; but as it was, he was smart and shrewd only in a bad way."
- The Washington Post; 2 May 1910. "John Morrissey's Fight With 'Yankee' Sullivan. Prize Fighter, Adventurer, Politician—Began in a Paper Mill, and Made Millions. Elected to Congress in 1866—Never Beaten in a Fair Fight During Career. From the New York Herald. As the first period in the history of the prize ring ends with 'Tom' Johnson and the second with 'Tom' Spring, so the third closes with the brief championship of 'Tom' King. From the sixties on the ring became less and less an exclusively British institution, the influence of America, and later Australasia, changing conditions and traditions."

== In popular culture ==
Primus recorded the song "Fisticuffs" about Sullivan on their Brown Album.

== Notes ==
Various sources report his birth as 12 April 1813, or 12 April 1815.

== See also ==
- William Poole

Achievements
Preceded by Tom Hyer	Heavyweight Bare-knuckle Boxing Champion; 1851– 12 October 1853	Succeeded by John Morrissey
