= Hyers, West Virginia =

Unincorporated community in West Virginia, US

Coordinates: 38°51′49″N 80°41′57″W

Hyers is an unincorporated community in Braxton County, in the U.S. state of West Virginia.

38°39'52.5"N 80°37'05.9"W

== History ==
A post office called Hyer was established in 1891, and remained in operation until 1956. The community was named after J. S. Hyer.
