= Dan Kerrigan =

American pugilist, sportsman and politician

- Born: 1843; New York City, United States
- Died: January 26, 1880 (aged 37); New York City, US
- Resting place: Calvary Cemetery
- Occupations: Sportsman, saloon keeper, pugilist
- Known for: Longtime political organizer and "fixer" for Tammany Hall
- Height: 5 ft 8 in (1.73 m)
- Political party: Democrat

Daniel Kerrigan (1843 – January 26, 1880) was an American pugilist, sportsman and politician. He was part owner of the Star and Garter, a popular Sixth Avenue saloon, and was a longtime political organizer and "fixer" for Tammany Hall.

He was also involved in one of the longest bare-knuckle boxing prize fights when he defeated "Australian Kelly" after a near-three and a half hour bout at Island Pond in 1860.

== Biography ==
Dan Kerrigan was one of five siblings born to Irish Catholic immigrant in New York City's Sixth Ward in 1843. His father, Daniel P. Kerrigan, was a lawyer and his mother "a woman of superior education". Dan Kerrigan received a public school education and later attended a local Catholic minor seminary under Rev. Father Halpin. He was a choir boy at St. Patrick's Church and was strongly encouraged to pursue religious training, and for a time considered entering the priesthood, but eventually became dissatisfied and left the school to work for underworld figures Ben Wood and Zachariah Simmons, both controlling the policy racket and illegal gambling in the city.

Kerrigan quickly rose through the ranks of their organization, becoming a first class bookmaker and accountant, and was given complete control of managing the organization's accounts. He acquired a large personal fortune while employed by Wood and Simmons and began living a lavish lifestyle. Kerrigan started gambling, becoming known as a high roller, and left the service of Wood and Simmons in 1860 to become a professional gambler. A formidable pugilist, he fought "Australian Kelly" in a $1,000 prize fight that same year. The bout was officially held two miles from the Island Pond Hotel in Island Pond on August 22, 1860. The fight lasted 25 rounds, lasting nearly three and a half hours, and was eventually won by Kerrigan after a foul blow by Kelly.

He became deeply involved in illegal gambling, having mixed success with running faro banks throughout the city, and traveled the United States for almost 20 years becoming one of the most widely recognized sportsmen in the country. He was also a regular at nearly every horse race held at Jerome Park, Saratoga and Monmouth Park.

Kerrigan developed extensive political connections as a longtime political organizer and "fixer" for Tammany Hall and was at one time the chairman of the Tammany Hall General Committee. In 1878, Kerrigan opened a saloon in the Twenty-Ninth District known as the Strand. This establishment became very popular in the area however, the following year, he was arrested by Captain Alexander "Clubber" Williams and charged with keeping a "disorderly house". His political connections secured his release and, in October 1879, he became one of the owners of the Star and Garter with William C. Rogers. During his four months at the establishment, he loaned $6,000 to those in need.

In early-January 1880, Kerrigan contracted a severe cold which quickly turned into pneumonia. Although he was advised to seek medical treatment, Kerrigan ignored this advice and his condition grew more serious. On January 22, he left his home to ride with a friend and returned seriously ill. Two physicians were called, Dr. Loomis and Sass, but were doubtful that he would recover. His three brothers and sister were called, as well as his partner William Rogers, and remained with him until the time of his death four days later. He dictated his last wishes during this time and, although he had not written a will, Kerrigan expressed that he wished his fortune to be divided among his family with Rogers as the executor. He also said he did not wish an elaborate funeral but to be quietly buried next to his parents in Calvary Cemetery. Kerrigan died at the Star and Garter on the evening of January 27, 1880. His funeral was held the following day at the Church of the Holy Innocents.
