= Pooles Island Light =

Lighthouse in Maryland, United States

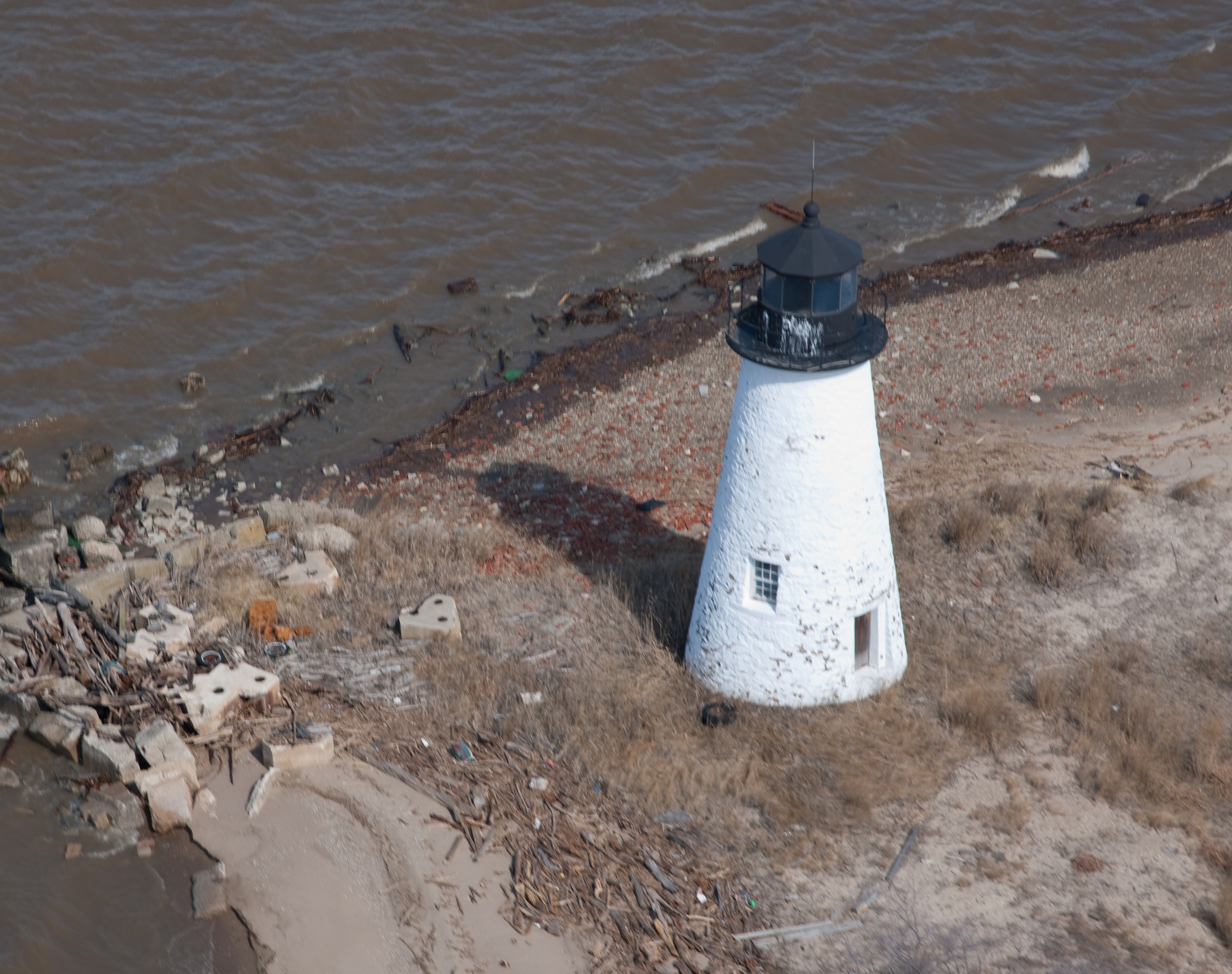
- 2011
- Location: Pooles Island off Aberdeen Proving Ground
- Coordinates: 39°17′25.6″N 76°15′58.8″W

Tower
- Constructed: 1825
- Construction: Stone
- Automated: 1918
- Height: 11.5 m (38 ft)
- Shape: conical tower
- Heritage: National Register of Historic Places listed place
- Fog signal: none

Light
- First lit: 1825
- Deactivated: 1939 - 2011
- Focal height: 44 feet (13 m)
- Lens: fourth-order Fresnel lens
- Characteristic: FI(4+3) W 16s
- Pooles Island Lighthouse
- U.S. National Register of Historic Places
- Nearest city: Edgewood, Maryland
- Area: 1 acre (0.40 ha)
- Built: 1825
- Built by: Donohoo, John
- NRHP reference No.: 97000060
- Added to NRHP: February 19, 1997

Pooles Island Light is the oldest lighthouse still standing in Maryland and the fourth oldest in the Chesapeake Bay area. The light is located on Pooles Island in the central Chesapeake Bay.

== History ==
Pooles Island was originally named Powell's Island by John Smith, but over the years the name was changed, possibly to reflect the numerous springs and pools on the island. The island was famed in the 18th and 19th centuries for its fertility, particularly for the peaches raised there in the 1880s and '90s. As it lies near the center of the bay near the mouth of the Gunpowder River, it was one of the first places in the area considered for a lighthouse, and in 1824 Congress appropriated $5,000 for construction of a light. John Donahoo and Simon Frieze won the contract to build it, the first of many lights constructed by Donahoo. The roughly constructed granite tower and keeper's house were joined three years later by a fog bell tower, the first in the state. In 1857 the original system of Argand lamps and reflectors was replaced by a fourth order Fresnel lens.

As part of the establishment of Aberdeen Proving Ground in 1917, Pooles Island was purchased by the federal government, and the light station turned over to the Army. The light was automated the following year. In 1939, it was decommissioned, and the surrounding structures were torn down. In 1927, a new black skeleton tower attached to a black caisson structure was built out in the water off the southern end of Pooles island as Pooles Island Bar Light. It was placed in operation in November 1927 and remains an active aid to navigation.

In 1994, the Army submitted a proposal to add the lighthouse to the National Register of Historic Places, with the intent to restore it to service as a private navigational aid. As part of this effort a thorough renovation effort was made to protect and stabilize the structure. It was added to the Register on February 19, 1997 as Pooles Island Lighthouse.

Pooles Island Light is "off limits to the general public because the island was used for bombing and shelling practice from 1918 through the early 1960s. There are many unexploded bombs and shells all over the island."

== Re-lighting ==
Pooles Island Lighthouse is in operation after 72 years of deactivation. Army officials at Aberdeen Proving Ground re-lit the beacon with fanfare as part of Armed Forces Day celebrations May 21, 2011. The Harford County Chamber of Commerce sponsored a dinner cruise for officials and community members to see the historic relighting ceremony. More than 300 spectators watched the show from the Spirit of Baltimore as part of the cruise sponsored by the Harford County Chamber of Commerce, Office of Economic Development, and the Army Alliance in cooperation with Aberdeen Proving Ground.

== Spelling ==
Various sources spell (or misspell) the name as Pools Island, Poole's Island, or Pool's Island. For example, nightbeacon.com's "Listing of United States Lighthouses" records this as "Pooles Island (Pools Island)", with one of the alternate spellings in parentheses Lighthousedepot.com calls it the "Poole's Island Light". In Lafayette in America (Chicago, 1975), historian Louis Gottschalk writes, "The next day Nicholson's fleet anchored at Pool's Island, about fifteen miles out in the bay, and they arrived at Annapolis two days later...." These variant spellings, though perhaps erroneous, have been in use for a long time. For example, early colonist Augustine Herrman kept a journal including an entry for Friday, October 3, 1659 which begins: "Rowed forward all day. Pass the eastern side of Pools Island near the western shore of Sassafracx River."

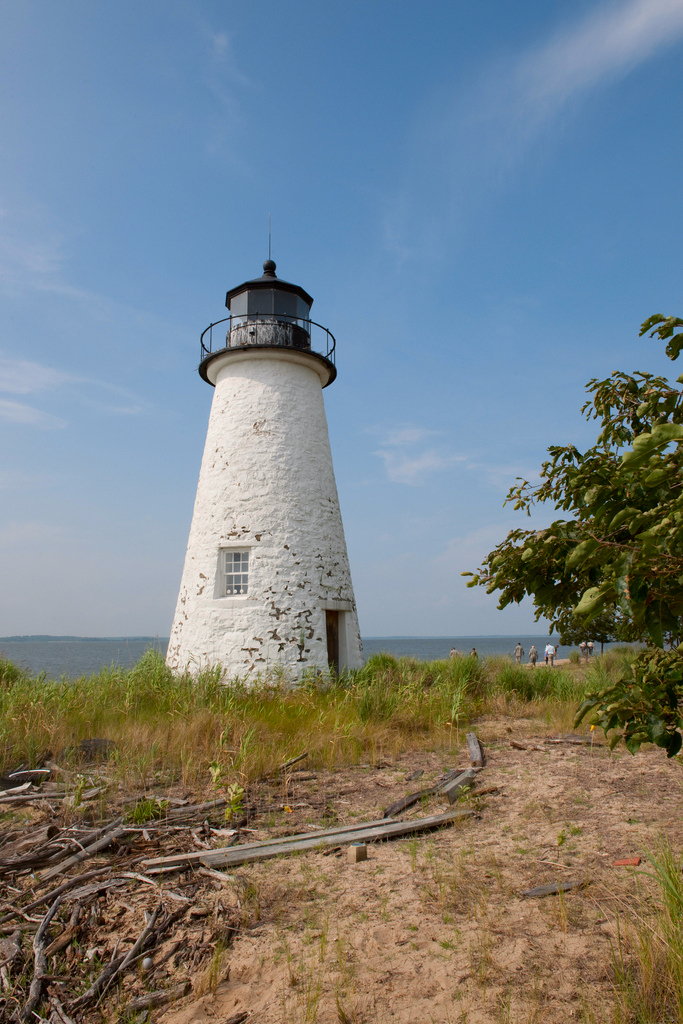
Aberdeen Proving Ground officials reactivated the Pooles Island Light using solar power in May 2011
