= John Morrissey =

American boxer and politician (1831–1878)

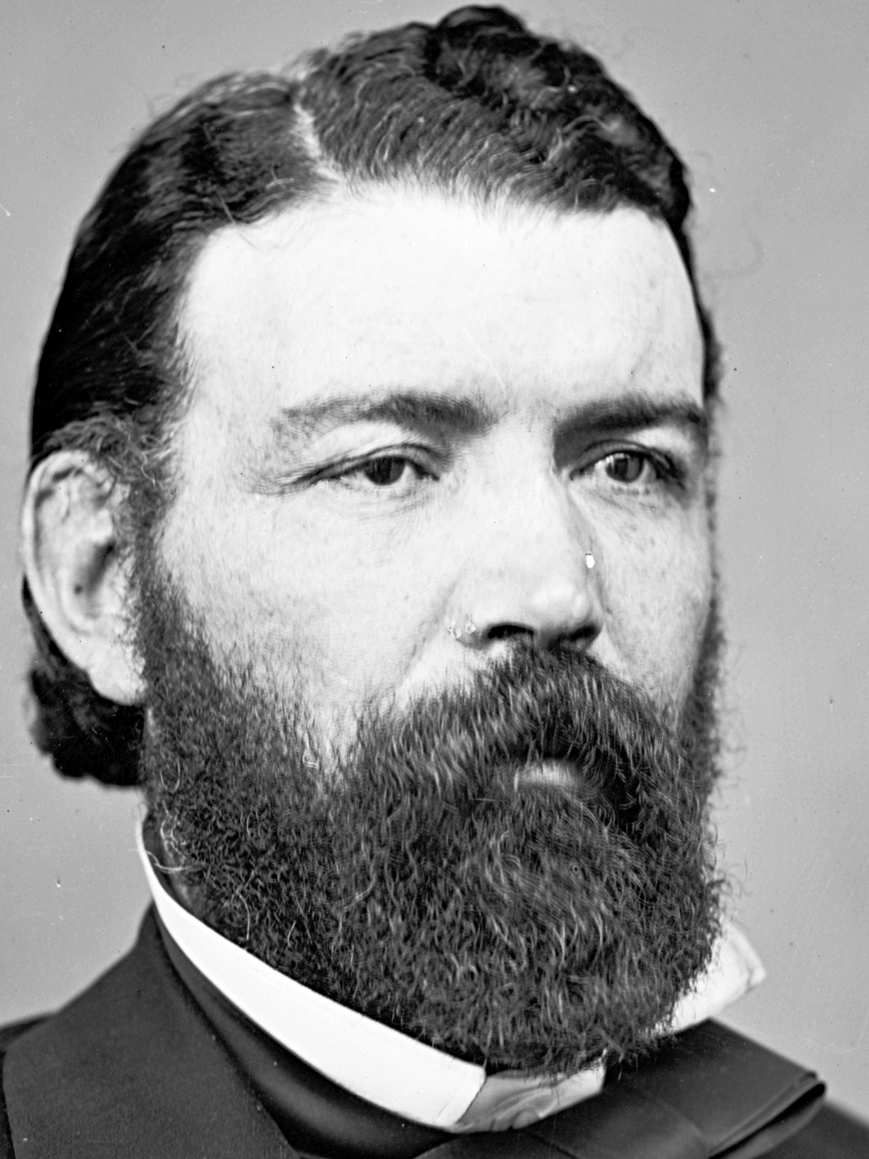
- Morrissey during his time in politics, c. 1870s

Member of the U.S. House of Representatives from New York's 5th district
- In office March 4, 1867 – March 4, 1871
- Preceded by: Nelson Taylor
- Succeeded by: William R. Roberts

Member of the New York Senate from the 7th district
- In office January 1, 1878 – May 1, 1878
- Preceded by: James W. Gerard Jr.
- Succeeded by: Thomas Murphy

Member of the New York Senate from the 4th district
- In office January 1, 1876 – December 31, 1877
- Preceded by: John Fox
- Succeeded by: Edward Hogan

Personal details
- Born: February 12, 1831 Templemore, County Tipperary, Ireland
- Died: May 1, 1878 (aged 47) Saratoga Springs, New York, U.S.
- Resting place: St. Peter's Cemetery, Troy, New York
- Party: Democratic
- Spouse: Susie Smith
- Children: 1
- Occupation: Boxer, gang leader, politician

John Morrissey (February 12, 1831 – May 1, 1878), also known as Old Smoke, was an Irish American politician, bare-knuckle boxing champion, and criminal.

He became a bare-knuckle boxer, challenging Yankee Sullivan, who was then recognized as the American boxing champion. Though Sullivan beat Morrissey up, the referee declared Morrissey the winner due to him not partaking in the onlooker brawl that happened near the end of the match. He became a professional gambler, owning gambling houses in New York City in the 1850s and 1860s. He emerged as a powerful politician and a U.S. Congressman from New York, between 1867 and 1871, backed by Tammany Hall. However, he later fell out with the Tammany Hall political machine and became Democratic State Senator for New York between 1876 and 1878, running as an anti-Tammany candidate. He represented the 4th District from 1876 to 1877 and the 7th District in 1878.

== Early life ==
Morrissey was born in Templemore, County Tipperary, Ireland, on February 12, 1831. Around 1833, his parents emigrated to the United States and settled in or near Troy, New York. According to a newspaper obituary, Morrissey's father, Timothy, worked as a laborer to support his large family, having seven daughters to support in addition to his only son, John. The same source states that after little formal education, Morrissey started work at the age of 12 in a wall-paper factory. He subsequently worked at an iron-works and a stove foundry. By 1848, Morrissey was taking a leading part in factional fighting in Troy between the "Down-Town" and "Up-Town" gangs. Morrissey reportedly became the "king-pin" of the faction "hailing from the lower part of the city" and was involved in fighting the rival group's leader, Jack O'Rourke, as well as "most of the up-town" people.

Morrissey moved to New York City in 1848, becoming a deck-hand on a steamer running between Albany and New York. He married Sarah Smith, the daughter of a ship's captain, around 1849. It was during his time in New York that he is said to have acquired his nickname, "Old Smoke," as a result of a fight. According to one story, during a fight with Thomas McCann, a noted rough-and-tumble fighter, Morrissey was said to have been pinned on his back atop burning coals from a stove that had been overturned. Morrissey endured the pain as his flesh burned, fought off McCann, and got back on his feet. Enraged, Morrissey beat McCann senseless as smoke from his burning flesh rose up from his back. The event earned him the nickname "Old Smoke," which stuck with him through the rest of his life.

In 1851, Morrissey sailed to San Francisco, seeking fortune during the California Gold Rush. While he didn't have any luck in that endeavor, Morrissey became a renowned gambler and made a fortune winning gold from prospectors.

== Winning the heavyweight championship ==
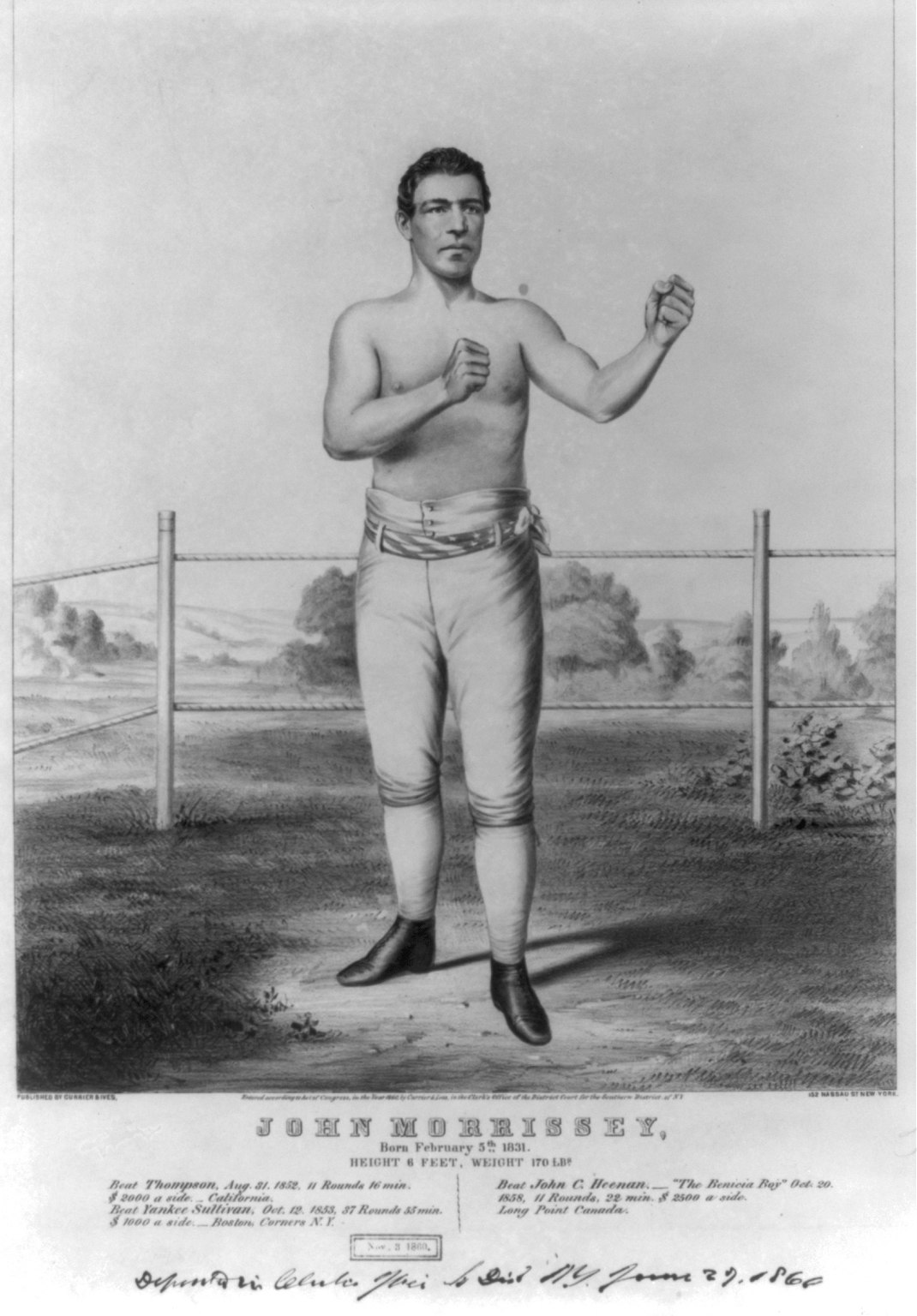
Morrissey as a boxer

It was during his time in California that Morrissey appeared for the first time in a professional prizefighting ring. On August 31, 1852, he defeated George Thompson at Mare Island, California, in the 11th round, earning $5,000 (~$152,099 in 2025). This success encouraged him to return to New York to fight the American Champion, Yankee Sullivan.

Morrissey returned to New York and challenged Sullivan repeatedly until the latter finally agreed. Due to the violent nature of the sport, boxing was illegal in most places during the 1850s. The first boxing rules, which were developed in the 19th century into the London Prize Ring Rules, were introduced by heavyweight champion Jack Broughton to protect fighters in the ring where deaths sometimes occurred. Under these rules, if a man went down and could not continue after a count of 30 seconds, the fight was over. Hitting a downed fighter and grasping below the waist were prohibited. Fights usually lasted for 20–30 rounds. Rounds continued until one fighter touched the ground with his knee, or simply fell down.

Articles for the fight between Sullivan and Morrissey were signed on September 1, 1853. The stake money was $1,000 a-side and it was specified that the new rules of the London Prize Ring would be applied. Morrissey went into training two days after signing the articles, with Orville Gardner selected as his trainer. The fight took place on October 12, 1853, in the hamlet of Boston Corners, which was then in Massachusetts but out of reach of its authorities, and thus a good location for the illegal match. The fight took place in a field, reportedly viewed by over 3,000 spectators. Sullivan dominated the match for most of the fight, but Morrissey held his own. The fight continued until the 37th round, when a struggle between the fighters on the ropes developed into hostilities between Sullivan and Morrissey's seconds and a "general riot" when elements of the crowd broke into the ring. The referee gave the decision to Morrissey, although it was not clear at the time why he made his verdict. One report said that it was because Sullivan had struck Morrissey with a "foul blow," another stated it was because of a "foul blow" and "not coming to time," whilst another stated that it was because Sullivan had stepped out of the ring before the referee had given his decision. The fight had lasted 55 minutes.

Morrissey did not escape legal retribution for the fight, however, as the Grand Jury of Berkshire County prepared a bill against him. When he surrendered to the court, he was fined $1,200.

== Murder of Bill Poole ==
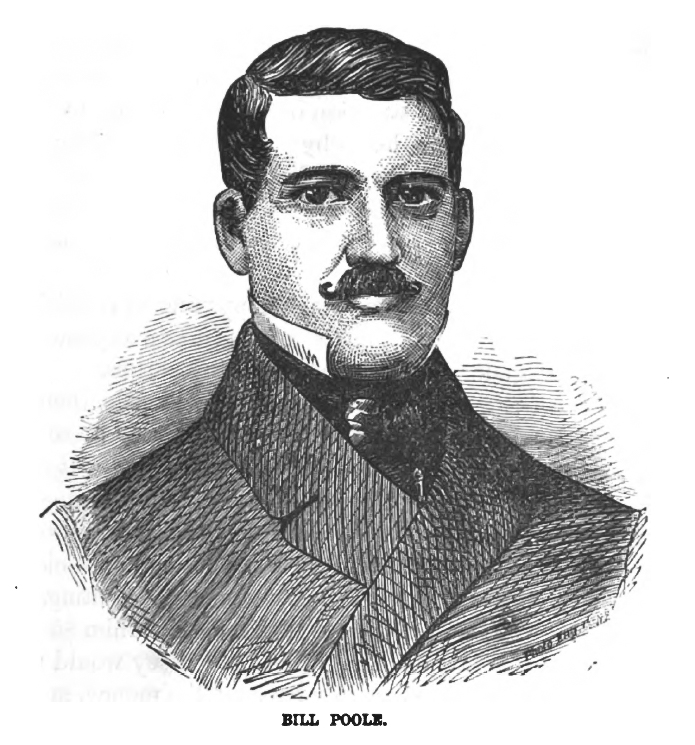
Bill Poole, nativist gang-leader, was involved in a fatal rivalry with Morrissey

Morrissey became involved in Democratic politics in New York City and developed a rivalry with William Poole, also known as "Bill the Butcher." Poole was leader of the rival Bowery Boys, who were enforcers for the Know-Nothing Party, and a boxer. On August 8, 1854, a fight was arranged between Poole and Morrissey at the corner of "West and Amos-street." According to a newspaper report, after some sparring, Poole threw Morrissey to the ground and was on top of him in an instant "pounding, gouging, bucking and biting," forcing Morrissey to concede the fight to Poole.

In February 1855, two of Morrissey's friends, Lew Baker and Jim Turner, shot and fatally wounded Bill the Butcher at Stanwix Hall, a saloon on Broadway. Morrissey and Baker were indicted for the murder, but the charges were dropped after three trials resulted in hung juries.

== Final prizefight ==
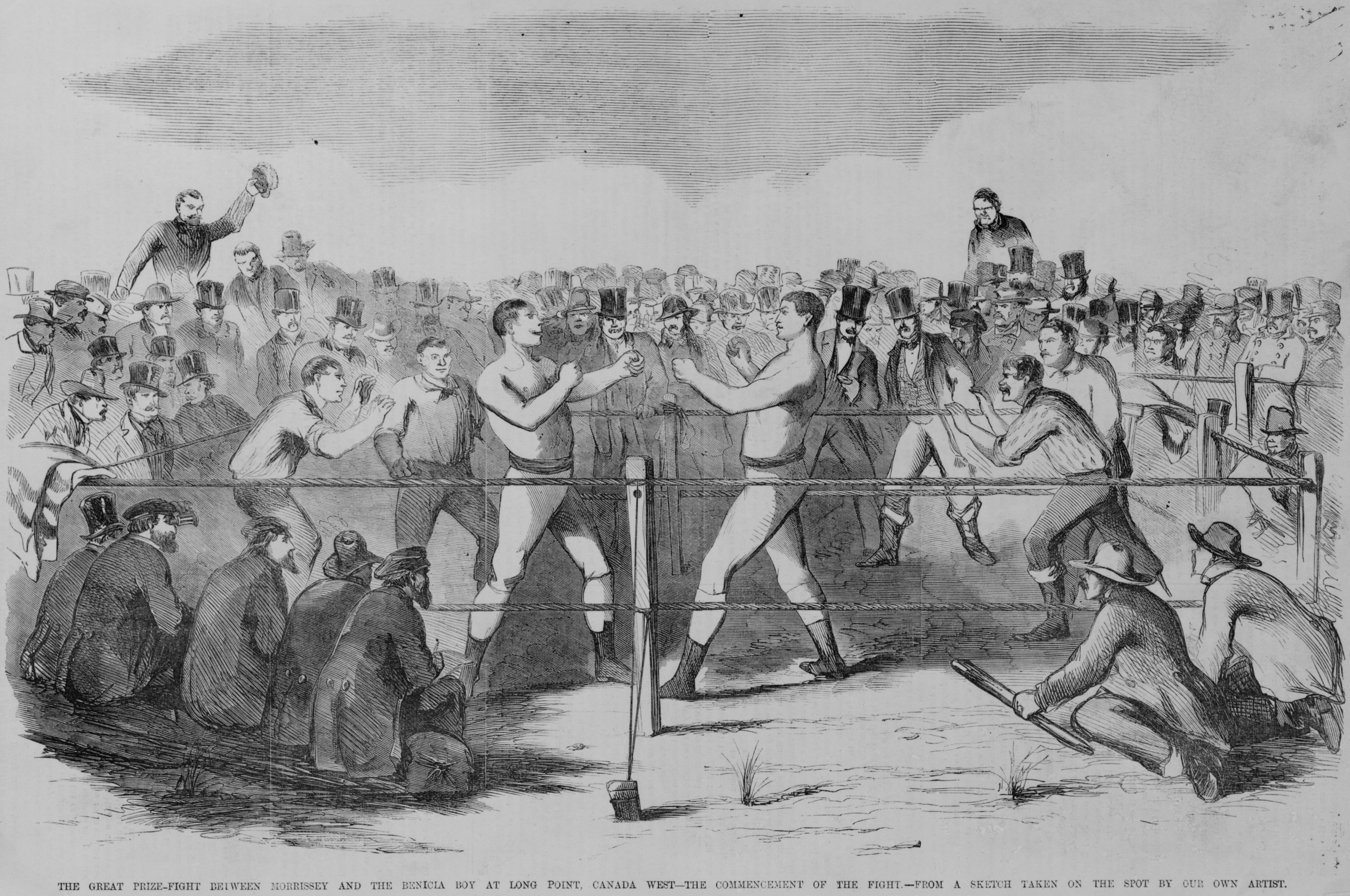
The great prize-fight between Morrissey and the Benicia Boy at Long Point, Canada West

Morrissey had apparently retired from prizefighting and had returned to Troy, New York. However, the appearance of fellow Troy native John C. Heenan in New York in the fall of 1857 brought about his return to the ring. Heenan, who had been in California, had earned the reputation of being a formidable fighting man among the followers of boxing. In December 1857, Heenan appeared before a New York audience as part of a sparring exhibition. In July 1858, a prizefight was arranged between Morrissey and Heenan, set for October 20, 1858, with the venue specified as Canada. The fight took place on the island of Long Point, Ontario. In the days before the fight, Heenan had been troubled with a sore on his leg which interrupted his training.

Stakes were set at $2,500 a-side. According to one ringside observer, Heenan had the better of the first three rounds but then started to tire. According to Alan Wright's account in The Great Prize Fight, Heenan damaged his right hand on a ring post early on in the bout, making him fight one-handed. Even so, he was getting the better of Morrissey, which incurred the wrath of Morrissey's supporters who had bet heavily on their man. They were well known for employing violent and unpleasant methods to help their man, and some accounts say they stepped on Heenan's damaged hand every time he went down. One journalist reported that they would punch Heenan in the kidneys when he leaned against the ropes. By the 11th and final round, Heenan was unable to defend himself and Morrissey struck a knockout blow, thereby retaining his title. Heenan claimed the title on Morrissey's retirement from boxing in 1859.

Although this was Morrissey's last fight, he did not lose interest in prizefighting, and in the spring of 1860, he crossed the Atlantic to witness the fight between Heenan and English champion Tom Sayers. Arriving in England on March 26, 1860, Morrissey visited the offices of the sporting newspaper, Bell's Life in London and Sporting Chronicle. He not only placed a £600 wager on Sayers to win the fight, but also visited Sayers at his training quarters where he was said to have given the Englishman "valuable advice." On his return to the United States towards the end of April 1860, Morrissey was able to spend a few hours at Queenstown, County Cork, waiting to go aboard the steamship. Here he attracted a "large circle of admirers" and was presented with a "handsome blackthorne stick, grown on the soil of Tipperary."

== Involvement in gambling and the Saratoga Race Course ==
After his retirement from boxing, Morrissey focused his attention on gambling establishments, allegedly owning stakes in 16 casinos at one point. In August 1860, it was estimated that he was worth $200,000 (~$5.84 million in 2025), "all of which he had gained at hazard." In 1862, a police raid on one of his gambling establishments in New York revealed that the house had made over $2,000 in December 1861.

After establishing a successful gaming house in Saratoga Springs, New York, Morrissey created the Saratoga Race Course with the help of William R. Travers, John R. Hunter, and Leonard Jerome. The first races were held in August 1863. He also established "The Club House," a casino in Saratoga that attracted such notable guests as Chester A. Arthur, Rutherford B. Hayes, Ulysses S. Grant, Cornelius Vanderbilt, John D. Rockefeller, and Mark Twain.

== Politics ==
Engraving of an older Morrissey, c. 1880s

In 1866, Morrissey ran for Congress with the backing of Tammany Hall. Despite his political rivals pointing out his numerous indictments and some convictions for various crimes, he became a Congressman and served two terms (1867–1871) in the House, in the 40th and 41st Congresses. As a Congressman, he always looked out for the interests of the Irish and was known to use strong-arm tactics to accomplish his legislative goals, at one point allegedly declaring he could "lick any man in the House."

=== State Senate ===
He eventually grew tired of the rampant corruption in Tammany Hall and left the House after his second term. Morrissey eventually testified against William Tweed, which helped put the latter in prison. He was elected as an Anti-Tammany "Reform Democrat" to the New York State Senate in 1875, representing the 4th District from 1876 to 1877. He was re-elected in 1877, but following redistricting, he represented the 7th District in 1878. He served in the 99th, 100th, and 101st New York State Legislatures, serving through his death on May 1, 1878.

== Boxing career record ==
3 Wins, 0 Losses, 0 Draws
Result	Opponent	Date	Location	Duration
Win	George Thompson	1852-08-31	Mare Island, California	11 rounds
Win	Yankee Sullivan	1853-10-12	Boston Corners, Massachusetts	37 rounds
Win	John C. Heenan	1858-10-20	Long Point, Canada	11 rounds

== Death and legacy ==
Morrissey contracted pneumonia and died on May 1, 1878, at the age of 47. The state closed all offices and flags were flown at half-staff. The entire State Senate attended his funeral in Troy, held on May 4, 1878, and 20,000 mourners lined the streets to pay their last respects. He was buried in St. Peter's Cemetery, just outside Troy.

In 1996, he was elected to the International Boxing Hall of Fame in the "Pioneer" category. Morrissey was featured on a portion of the History Channel documentary, Paddy Whacked, The History of the Irish Mob, based on T.J. English's narrative, as the first Irish mob boss in American history. His feud with Bill Poole was featured in an episode of Blood Feuds.

Prizefighter "Johnny Morrissey" is the hero in a popular Irish ballad called "Morrissey and the Russian Sailor." Although the ballad has several variations, most versions include some phrases that connect the song's hero with the historical Morrissey: his Irish birthplace in Templemore, County Tipperary; his status as a champion fighter, signified by a prize belt; his defeat of Thompson and of 'the Yankee,' among others. The main story in the ballad, however—a prizefight against a Russian sailor in Tierra del Fuego—does not seem to be historically documented. One version of the song was printed as a broadsheet by E.C. Yeats's Cuala Press in 1911; a digitized image of it has been posted by the Villanova University Library.

Joseph D. Morrissey, a Virginia politician, has claimed to be a descendant of John Morrissey, but cannot be a linear descendant as John Morrissey apparently had only one child, a son, who did not marry and died young.

== Sources ==
- Charlton T. Lewis (ed.), Harper's Book of Facts, Harper & Brothers, New York, 1906
- Herbert Asbury, The Gangs of New York, Arrow, New edition 2003, ISBN 978-0099436744
- John C. Kofoed, Brandy For Heroes: A Biography Of The Honorable John Morrissey, Champion Heavyweight Of America And State Senator, Literary Licensing, LLC, 2011, ISBN 978-1258167691
- Brien Bouyea, "Bare Knuckles and Saratoga Racing: The Remarkable Life of John Morrissey" Charleston, South Carolina [The History Press], 2016
- Nicholson, James C. The Notorious John Morrisey: How a Bare-Knuckle Brawler Became a Congressman and Founded Saratoga Race Course. Lexington, Kentucky: University Press of Kentucky, 2016, ISBN 978-0813167503

Sporting positions
Preceded by Yankee Sullivan	Heavyweight boxing champion 1853–1859	Succeeded by John Carmel Heenan
U.S. House of Representatives
Preceded by Nelson Taylor	Member of the U.S. House of Representatives from New York's 5th congressional district 1867–1871	Succeeded by William R. Roberts
New York State Senate
Preceded by John Fox	New York State Senate; 4th District; 1876–1877	Succeeded by Edward Hogan
Preceded by James W. Gerard Jr.	New York State Senate; 7th District; 1878	Succeeded by Thomas Murphy
