= David S. Reynolds =

American historian

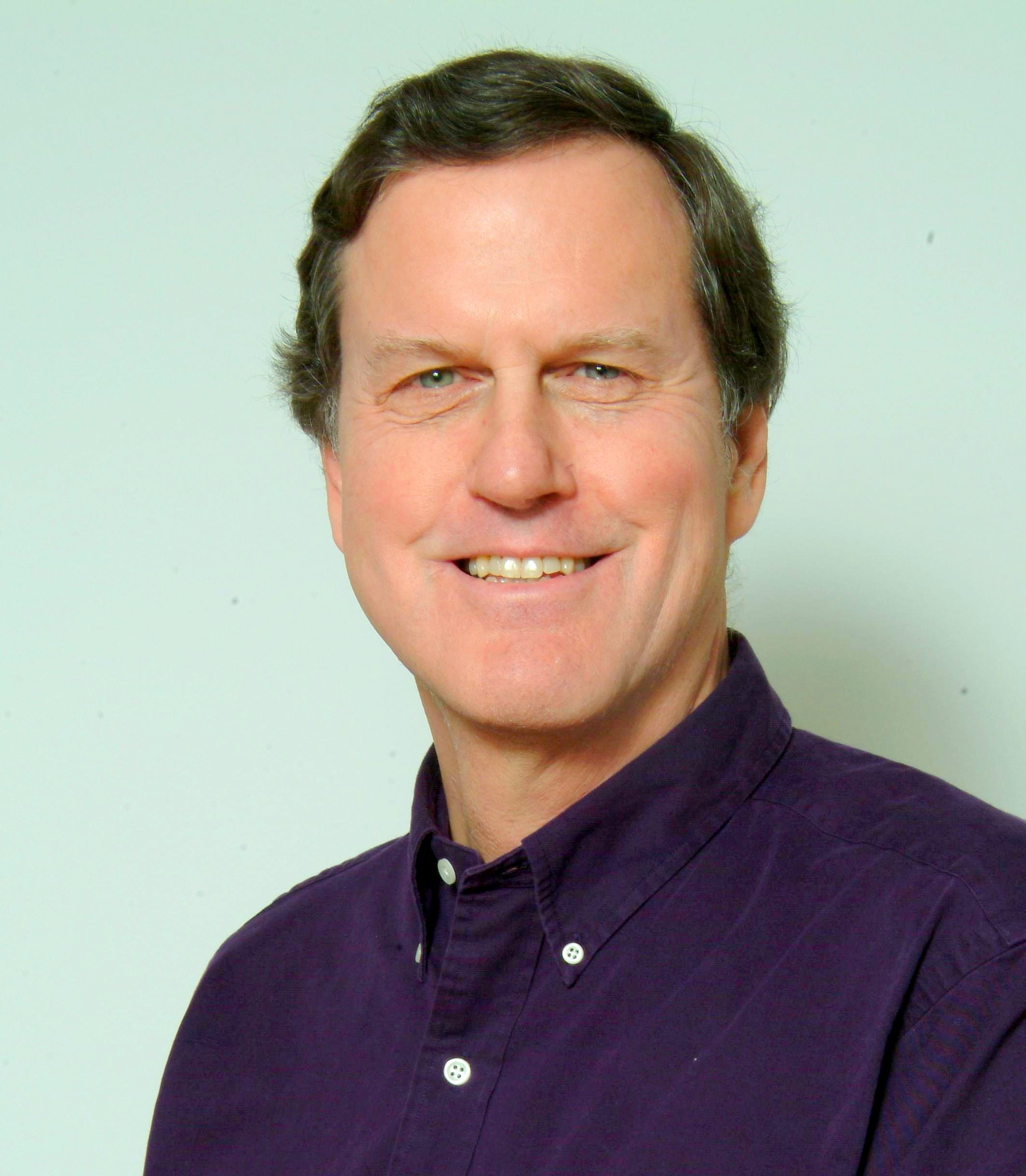
- Education: Amherst College (BA); University of California, Berkeley (PhD)
- Occupations: educator, critic, biographer, historian

David S. Reynolds (born 1948) is an American literary critic, biographer, and historian who has written about American literature and culture. He is the author or editor of fifteen books, on the Civil War era—including figures such as Walt Whitman, Abraham Lincoln, Herman Melville, Nathaniel Hawthorne, Edgar Allan Poe, Ralph Waldo Emerson, Henry David Thoreau, Emily Dickinson, Harriet Beecher Stowe, George Lippard, and John Brown. Reynolds has been awarded the Bancroft Prize, the Lincoln Prize, the Christian Gauss Award, the Ambassador Book Award, the Gustavus Myers Book Award, the John Hope Franklin Prize (Honorable Mention), and was a finalist for the National Book Critics Circle Award. He is a regular reviewer for The New York Review of Books..

== Early life and education ==
Reynolds was born in Providence, Rhode Island, on August 30, 1948, and was raised nearby in Barrington, located near Narragansett Bay. He attended the Moses Brown School and the Providence Country Day School before moving on to Amherst College, where he received a B.A. in 1970.

After teaching high school English at the Providence Country Day School for a year, he pursued his graduate studies in American literature and American Studies at the University of California, Berkeley, where he was awarded his Ph.D. in 1979.

== Teaching career ==
Reynolds has taught American literature and American Studies at Northwestern University, Barnard College, Rutgers University-Camden, New York University, Baruch College, and the Sorbonne Nouvelle-Paris III. Since 2006, he has been a Distinguished Professor at the Graduate Center of the City University of New York.

== Writings and influence ==
=== Cultural Biography ===
Reynolds is a proponent of cultural biography, contextualizing historical figures in their era. He was influenced by the "representative men" theory of Ralph Waldo Emerson, who writes, "the ideas of the time are in the air, and infect all who breathe it… We learn of our contemporaries what they know without effort, and almost through the pores of our skin." In Abe: Abraham Lincoln in His Times Reynolds challenges the usual view of Lincoln as the quintessential self-made man who arose, without education or guidance, from a crude background and a barren American culture that offered few nurturing materials. Instead, Reynolds shows, Lincoln learned a lot from a rich, teeming cultural environment that he absorbed and rechanneled in his brilliant presidency and his immortal speeches. Reynolds argues in John Brown, Abolitionist that Brown was not an isolated, crazed antislavery terrorist but rather an amalgam of social currents—religious, racial, reformist, political—that found explosive realization in him. In Walt Whitman's America: A Cultural Biography, Reynolds takes seriously Whitman's declarations that he was "the age transfigured" and that "in estimating my volumes, the world's current times and deeds, and their spirit, must first be profoundly estimated." Reynolds writes that Whitman's growing alarm over political controversies, corruption, and class division led him to try to heal his nation through his poetry, which absorbed images from many aspects of social and cultural life, including religion, science, city life, theater, oratory, photography, painting, reform movements, and sexual mores.

=== American history ===
Reynolds highlights the intersection of politics and culture consistent with Abraham Lincoln's view that "public sentiment is everything... he who moulds public sentiment, goes deeper than he who enacts statutes or pronounces decisions." In books like John Brown: Abolitionist, Mightier than the Sword: Uncle Tom's Cabin and the Battle for America, and Waking Giant: America in the Age of Jackson, Reynolds tells the story of political and social leaders, artists, musicians, reformers, scientists, artists, ministers, and self-styled religious prophets who shaped American history. In Mightier than the Sword: Uncle Tom's Cabin and the Battle for America, he traces the impact of Harriet Beecher Stowe's 1852 best-seller Uncle Tom's Cabin on the rise of Lincoln, the American Civil War, and worldwide events, including the end of serfdom in Russia, down to its influence on race relations and popular culture in the twentieth century.

=== Literary criticism ===
Reynolds challenges the once-prevalent view—introduced by the New Critics and later promoted by the deconstructionists and other theorists—that literature is divorced from the author's life and contexts. His reconstruction of the cultural and social contexts of literature began with his book Faith in Fiction: The Emergence of Religious Literature in America, which explores some 250 writers from Puritan times through the late 19th century. In Beneath the American Renaissance: The Subversive Imagination in the Age of Emerson and Melville, Reynolds leverages the title of F.O. Matthiessen's best-known work and expands his thesis. Here Reynolds combines elements of New Historicism and cultural studies with archival research to show that great literature is characterized by its radical openness to biographical, political, social, and cultural images, which certain responsive writers adopted and transformed, yielding such symbols as Melville's white whale, Hawthorne's scarlet letter, Poe's raven, and Whitman's grass leaves. Contesting the standard interpretation of America's great writers as marginal figures in a sentimental, proper society, Reynolds reveals that they were instead immersed in a culture that was frequently sensational, subversive, or erotic, epitomized by popular novels about city mysteries, such as the lurid bestseller The Quaker City, or The Monks of Monk Hall by the Philadelphia writer George Lippard (the subject of two other books by Reynolds).

== Family ==
Reynolds's wife, whose professional name is Suzanne Nalbantian, is a professor of Comparative Literature at Long Island University and specializes in the interdisciplinary relationship between literature and neuroscience. Her eight books include Memory in Literature: From Rousseau to Neuroscience, The Memory Process: Neuroscientific and Humanistic Perspectives (coedited with Paul M. Matthews and James B. McClelland), Aesthetic Autobiography: From Life to Art in the Marcel Proust, James Joyce, Virginia Woolf and Anais Nin, and Secrets of Creativity: What Neuroscience, the Arts, and Our Minds Reveal (coedited with Paul M. Matthews).

== Awards and honors ==
- Bancroft Prize, for Walt Whitman's America
- Lincoln Prize, for Abe: Abraham Lincoln in His Times
- Top Ten Books of the Year," 2020, Wall Street Journal, for Abe: Abraham Lincoln in His Times
- Ambassador Book Award, for Walt Whitman's America
- National Book Critics Circle Award finalist, for Walt Whitman's America
- Christian Gauss Award (Phi Beta Kappa Society), for Beneath the American Renaissance
- Gustavus Myers Book Award, for John Brown, Abolitionist
- Kansas Notable Book, for John Brown, Abolitionist
- Notable Books of the Year, The New York Times Book Review, for Beneath the American Renaissance, Walt Whitman's America, and Waking Giant: America in the Age of Jackson
- Best Books of the Year, The Washington Post, for Waking Giant: America in the Age of Jackson and Abe: Abraham Lincoln in His Times
- A New Yorker Favorite Book of the Year, for Mightier than the Sword: Uncle Tom's Cabin and the Battle for America
- Best Books of the Year, Kirkus Reviews, for Mightier than the Sword: Uncle Tom's Cabin and the Battle for America and Abe: Abraham Lincoln in His Times
- Best Books of the Year, Christian Science Monitor, for Abe: Abraham Lincoln in His Times
- John Hope Franklin Publication Prize, Honorable Mention, American Studies Association, for Beneath the American Renaissance
- Who's Who in America (2000 edition to the present), Who's Who in the World (2000 edition to the present)
- Selected as Honorary Co-chair of the New-York Historical Society, 2009–present
- Fellow, Society of American Historians (honorary elected position), 1997–present
- Fellow, American Antiquarian Society (honorary elected position), 1996–present

== Bibliography ==
External videos
- Booknotes interview with Reynolds on Walt Whitman's America: A Cultural Biography, April 28, 1996, C-SPAN
- Presentation by Reynolds on John Brown, Abolitionist: The Man Who Killed Slavery, Sparked the Civil War, and Seeded Civil Rights, May 12, 2005, C-SPAN
- After Words interview with Reynolds on Waking Giant: America in the Age of Jackson, December 20, 2008, C-SPAN
- Presentation by Reynolds on Mightier Than the Sword: Uncle Tom's Cabin and the Battle for America at the Harriet Beecher Stowe Center, May 19, 2011, C-SPAN
- Presentation by Reynolds about Lincoln's Selected Writings, April 14, 2015, C-SPAN

=== Books ===
- Two Ships: Jamestown 1619, Plymouth 1620, and the Struggle for the Soul of America Penguin, 2026.
- Abe: Abraham Lincoln in His Times. Penguin Press, 2020.
- Mightier Than the Sword: Uncle Tom's Cabin and the Battle for America. W. W. Norton, 2012.
- Waking Giant: America in the Age of Jackson. HarperCollins, 2008.
- John Brown, Abolitionist: The Man Who Killed Slavery, Sparked the Civil War, and Seeded Civil Rights. Alfred A. Knopf, 2005.
- Walt Whitman. Oxford University Press, 2005.
- Walt Whitman's America: A Cultural Biography. Alfred A. Knopf, 1995.
- Beneath the American Renaissance: The Subversive Imagination in the Age of Emerson and Melville. Harvard University Press, 1989.
- George Lippard. Twayne Publishers, 1982.
- Faith in Fiction: The Emergence of Religious Literature in America. Harvard University Press, 1981.

=== Books (editor) ===
- Lincoln's Selected Writings: A Norton Critical Edition.
- Uncle Tom's Cabin, or, Life Among the Lowly [The Splendid Edition], by Harriet Beecher Stowe.
- A Historical Guide to Walt Whitman.
- Walt Whitman's Leaves of Grass, 150th Anniversary Edition.
- George Lippard, Prophet of Protest: Writings of an American Radical, 1822–1854.
- The Quaker City, or The Monks of Monk Hall, by George Lippard.
- Venus in Boston and Other Tales of 19th Century City Life, by George Thompson (coedited with Kimberly Gladman).
- The Serpent in the Cup: Temperance in American Literature (coedited with Debra J. Rosenthal).

=== Book about David S. Reynolds ===
- Above the American Renaissance: David S. Reynolds and the Spiritual Imagination in American Literary Studies. Edited by Harold K. Bush and Brian Yothers.
