= William Warren (actor, born 1812) =

American actor

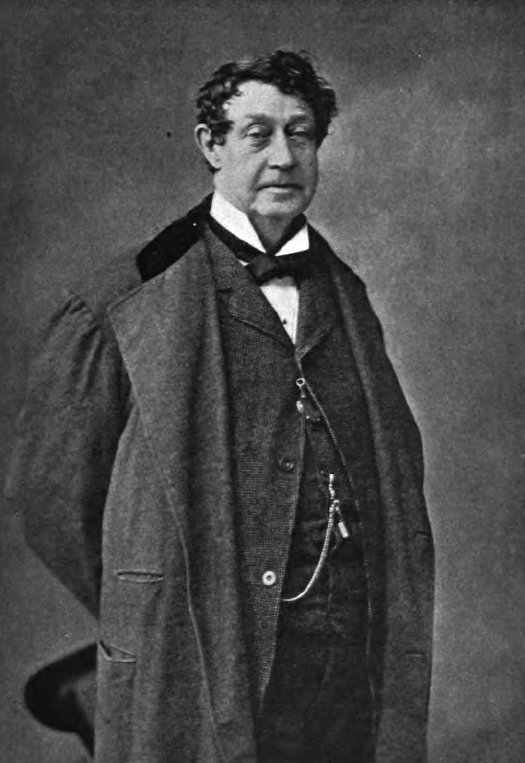
- Born: November 17, 1812; Philadelphia, Pennsylvania
- Died: September 21, 1888 (aged 75); Boston, Massachusetts
- Occupation: Stage actor

William Warren (1812–1888) was an American actor. He performed primarily with the theater at the old Boston Museum.

== Biography ==
Warren was born in Philadelphia on November 17, 1812, the son of actor William Warren and his third wife, Esther Fortune. Through his mother, he was a cousin of American actor Joseph Jefferson and nephew of the former actress Louisa, Countess of Craven, actor John Brunton and actress Anna Ross in England. He was educated at the Franklin Institute, then a boys' school, in that city. After his father's death in 1832, he made his debut a week later at the Arch Street Theatre in Philadelphia in the part of Young Norval. His father had been an actor, first in Britain, and began his career on stage with that character. The young Warren first performed in New York City in 1841, in London in 1845, and in Boston in 1846. He played a wide variety of characters, from broad and eccentric comedy to juvenile tragedy, with general acceptance. During the last few years of this period he performed in a company headed by his brother-in-law, John Blake Rice.

In 1847 Warren became a member of the Boston Museum theatre, where he primarily performed until his retirement in 1883. Warren was best known for roles such as Dr. Pangloss in The Heir at Law, Sir Peter Teazle in The School for Scandal, Dr. Primrose and Touchstone in As You Like It.

In December 1853, Warren was accused of shooting Singleton Mercer. He had been the defendant in a sensational attempted murder trial and was acquitted. The events were fictionalized in George Lippard's The Quaker City, or The Monks of Monk Hall. Warren was never charged in the case, and Mercer ultimately recovered from his injury.

Warren died in Boston on September 21, 1888.

== Sources ==
- Mckay and Wingate, Famous American Actors of To-Day (New York, 1896)
- Wilson, J. G.; Fiske, J., eds. (1889). "Warren, William (actor)" . Appletons' Cyclopædia of American Biography. New York: D. Appleton.
