= Julia Anne Turnbull =

American ballet dancer

Julia Turnbull
- Born: Julia Anne Turnbull; 18 June 1822; Montreal, Canada
- Died: 11 September 1887 (aged 65); Brooklyn, New York
- Occupations: Ballet dancer and actress
- Father: John D. Turnbull

Julia Anne Turnbull (18 June 1822 – 11 September 1887) was an American dancer and actress. She studied ballet with French dancer Mme LeComte and LeComte's brother, Jules Martin, and with James Sylvain. Turnbull became very popular in the United States in the 1840s by playing classic title roles such as Giselle and Esmeralda.

== Life ==
Born in 1822 in Montreal, Canada, Julia Anne Turnbull was the daughter of a Scottish father (John D. Turnbull) and a New York-born mother (name unknown). Julia’s family moved to Albany, New York, when she was three years old. She made her stage debut as an actress with her sisters Emily and Caroline. At age six, Julia played the part of Justin in The Wandering Boys, sharing the stage with Louisa Lane Drew.

== Work ==
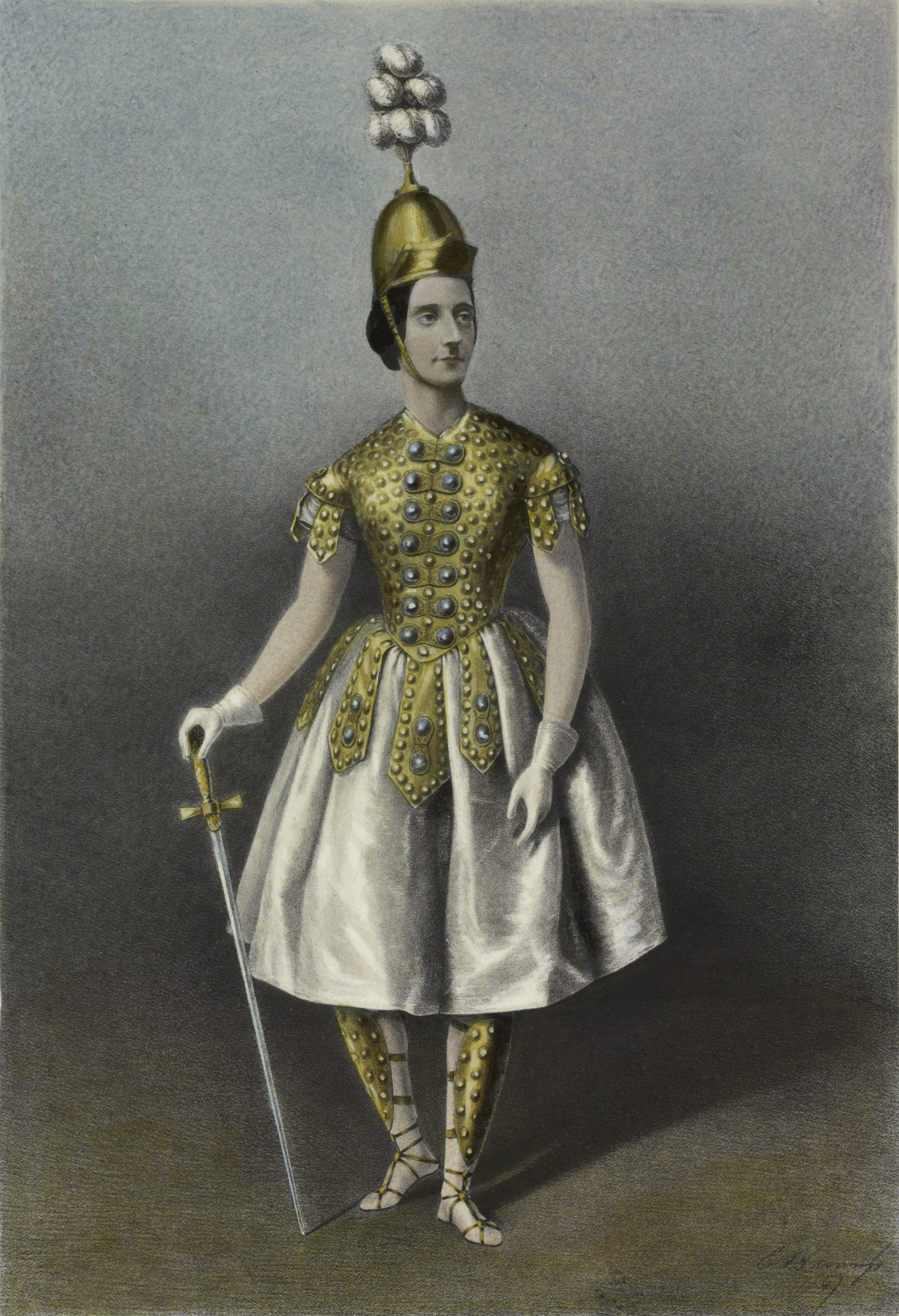
Julia Turnbull in The Naid Queen

Julia Anne Turnbull became a regular player in the stock company at the Park Theater in New York City, where she studied ballet with French dancer Mme Le Comte and Jules Martin, LeComte’s brother. She debuted in her first leading dance role in The Sisters at the Bowery Theater in June 1839. Her co-star, Mary Ann Lee, would go on to become the first American to dance Giselle.

Turnbull joined Fanny Elssler’s company while the Viennese ballet dancer toured the United States in 1840. As a soloist, she danced roles second only to Elssler’s, and continued studying ballet with James Sylvain, Elssler’s partner. When Elssler returned to Europe, Julia returned to the Bowery Theater to join the stock company and launch her own solo tour as the star of The Naiad Queen in 1847. In the same year, she received excellent reviews for her interpretation of Giselle. She was one of the first American dancers to play classic title roles such as Giselle and Esmeralda. Turnbull became very popular in the 1840s, being considered an "uncontested ballerina of nation-wide fame".

Turnbull left the company after her rivalry with the Italian dancer Giovanna Ciocca resulted in a riot at the Bowery Theater in August 1848. She continued to dance until 1857, when she retired from stage. She lived quietly in Brooklyn for the next 30 years. Julia died of tuberculosis and was buried in Greenwood Cemetery in Brooklyn.
