= Herman Bellstedt =

American cornet soloist (1858–1926)

- Born: February 12, 1858; Free and Hanseatic City of Bremen
- Died: June 8, 1926 (aged 68) San Francisco, United States
- Genres: Romantic, Band music, cornet solos
- Occupations: Cornetist, Conductor, Composer
- Instrument: Cornet
- Years active: 1873–1926

Herman Bellstedt (February 12, 1858, Bremen – June 8, 1926, San Francisco) was a well-known American cornet soloist.

== Early life ==
He was born in the Free and Hanseatic City of Bremen. He immigrated to Cincinnati, Ohio at age nine. He studied the cornet with his father, who was also a cornetist, and Mylius Weigand. As a young boy, he performed with local bands.

== Career ==
After giving his first performance on May 10, 1873 at the Atlantic Garden at age 15, he quickly began performing across the country in various bands and orchestra and was nicknamed the "Boy Wonder". In 1874, he began his career with the Cincinnati Reed Band until 1879. In 1879, he started performing with the Red Hussar Band on Manhattan Beach and returned to the Cincinnati Reed Band in 1883. From 1904 to 1906, he performed with the John Philip Sousa Band, sharing solos with Herbert L. Clarke and Walter B. Rogers. He also performed with the Frederick N. Innes Band from 1906 to 1909. He also performed with Gilmore's Band, orchestras conducted by Theodore Thomas, Frank Van der Stucken, and Henry Schradieck.

He co-founded the Bellstedt-Ballenger Band in Denver in 1892 with Louis Ballenberger and served as its conductor until 1912.

Bellstedt served as Professor of Wind Instruments at the Cincinnati Conservatory.

In addition to performing, Bellstedt composed for band, orchestra, piano, violin, and cornet. His cornet solos remain popular with today's trumpeters and include Napoli (Variations on a Neapolitan Song), Fantasia No.1, La Coquette, Capriccio Brilliante, La Mandolinata, and Variations on the Carnival of Venice.

On June 8, 1926, Bellstedt died in San Francisco.
