= William Warren (actor, born 1767) =

British actor, comedian and theater manager

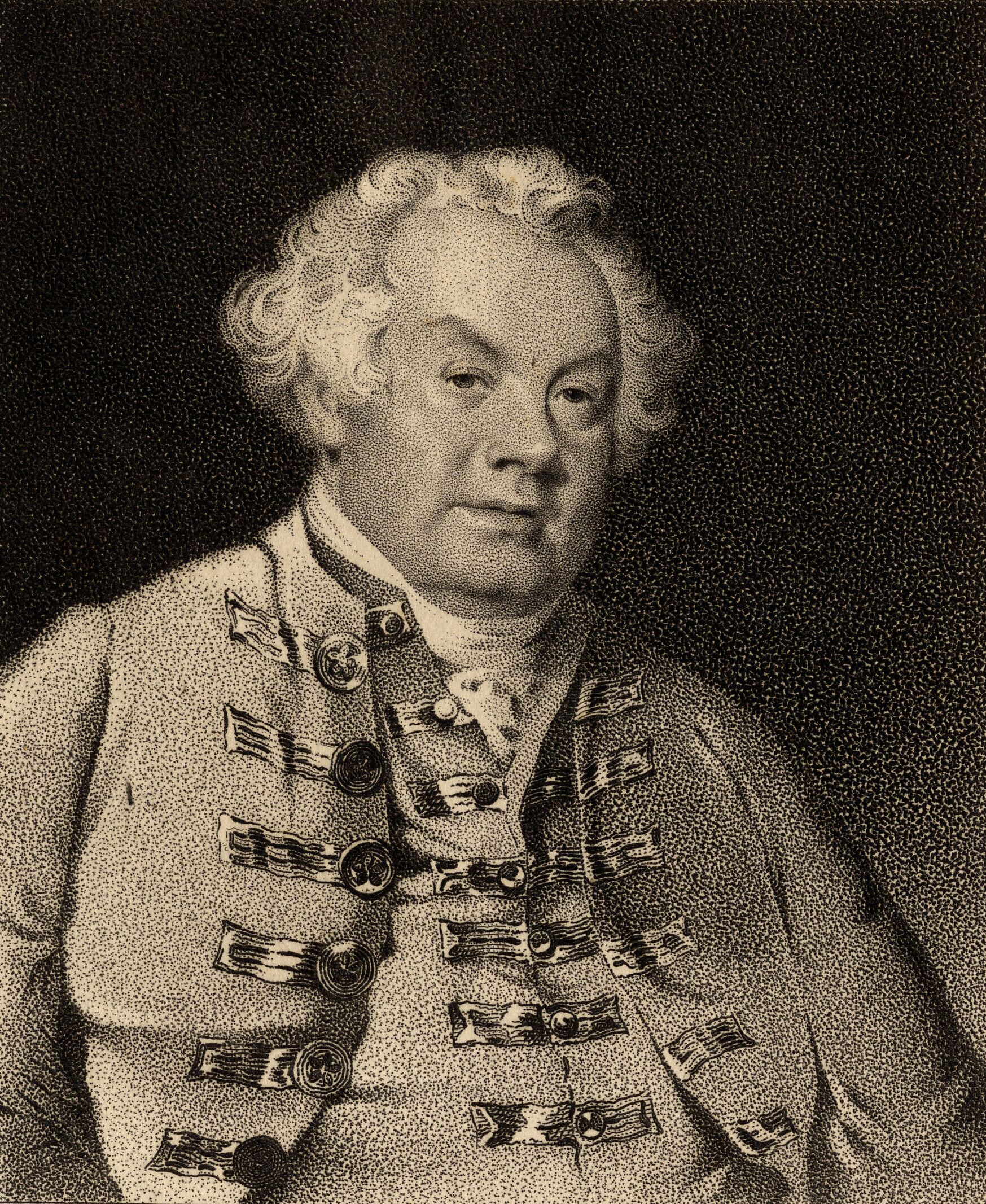
- Warren as Sir Peter Teazle in The School for Scandal
- Born: 10 May 1767; Bath, Somerset, England
- Died: 19 October 1832 (aged 65); Baltimore, Maryland, United States

William Warren (10 May 1767 - 19 October 1832) was an actor, comedian, and theater manager.

His first appearance was as Young Norval in Home's tragedy of Douglas. He also performed in Yorkshire. As Trueman in George Barnwell, as Hastings in She Stoops to conquer, as a pilgrim in King Richard, Mirvan in Orphan of China and First Scholar in The Padlock at Leeds theatre. Soon afterward, Warren came to the United States, making his debut at Baltimore, Maryland, as Friar Lawrence in Romeo and Juliet. In 1805 he went to England, as agent for the Philadelphia Theatre, to recruit a company of comedians.

After his return in 1806 Warren took the twice widowed actress, Ann Merry in April 1807 as his second wife. Their only child together died at birth, and Merry died in 1808. Warren married Esther Fortune in 1809, with whom he had six children. Later, Warren became manager of the Chestnut Street Theatre in Philadelphia. There he made his last appearance on 25 November 1829 as Robert Bramble in The Poor Gentleman.

All of Warren's children either entered or married into theatrical professions. His eldest son, William Warren (1812–1888), was an actor, and youngest son, Henry, a theatre manager. Hester (1810–1842) was an actress and married actor Joseph Proctor, while Anna (1815–1872) married comedian Dan Marble.
