= Thomas Flynn (1830s actor) =

American actor

Thomas Flynn (fl. 1834) was an English-born American actor and comedian who, with his wife, was a popular performer at the Bowery Theatre in the mid-1830s. After the Farren Riots he briefly took over management of the Bowery.

== Selected filmography ==
- A Counterfeit Santa Claus (1912)
