= Joseph Proctor =

American actor

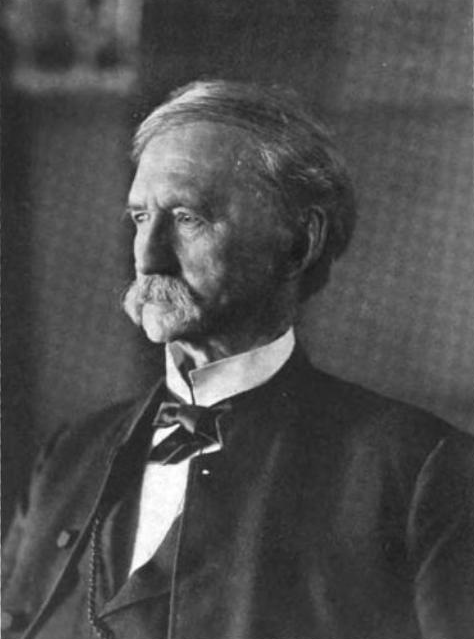
- Born: May 7, 1816; Marlborough, Massachusetts
- Died: October 2, 1897 (aged 81); Boston, Massachusetts
- Occupation: Actor
- Spouses: Hester Warren; Elizabeth Wakeman

Signature
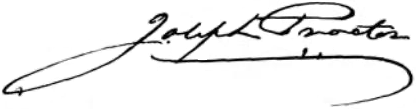

Joseph Proctor (May 7, 1816 – October 2, 1897) was a popular 19th-century American actor. He was best known for playing the lead role in the melodrama Nick of the Woods.

== Career ==
Proctor was born in Marlborough, Massachusetts, in 1816 to Nicholson and Lucy (Bond) Proctor. He first appeared on stage in Boston in November 1833 playing Damon in John Banim's Damon and Pythias. By 1837 he was playing lead roles in Philadelphia. Commencing on May 6, 1839, at the Bowery Theatre in New York, he took the lead role of Nathan Slaughter (and Jibbenainosay) in Nick of the Woods (Proctor actually played six roles in the play, which was usually an advertised feature of his performances.) Though he played many other roles in his career, this was the "play with which his name was so continuously associated as to create the impression that he never acted any other characters of consequence." He performed the role over 2,500 times.

Proctor performed throughout the United States and did some theater management. He went to Europe to perform from 1859 to 1861. He retired from the stage in the 1880s, except for occasional benefit appearances.

== Personal ==
Proctor first married Hester Warren (1810–41) in 1837, one of the daughters of actor William Warren (1767–1832). In 1851 he married Elizabeth Wakeman. Their daughter Anna E. Proctor also went on stage later. Proctor died in Boston on October 2, 1897.
