= Atlantic Garden =

Coordinates: 40.71586°N 73.99644°W

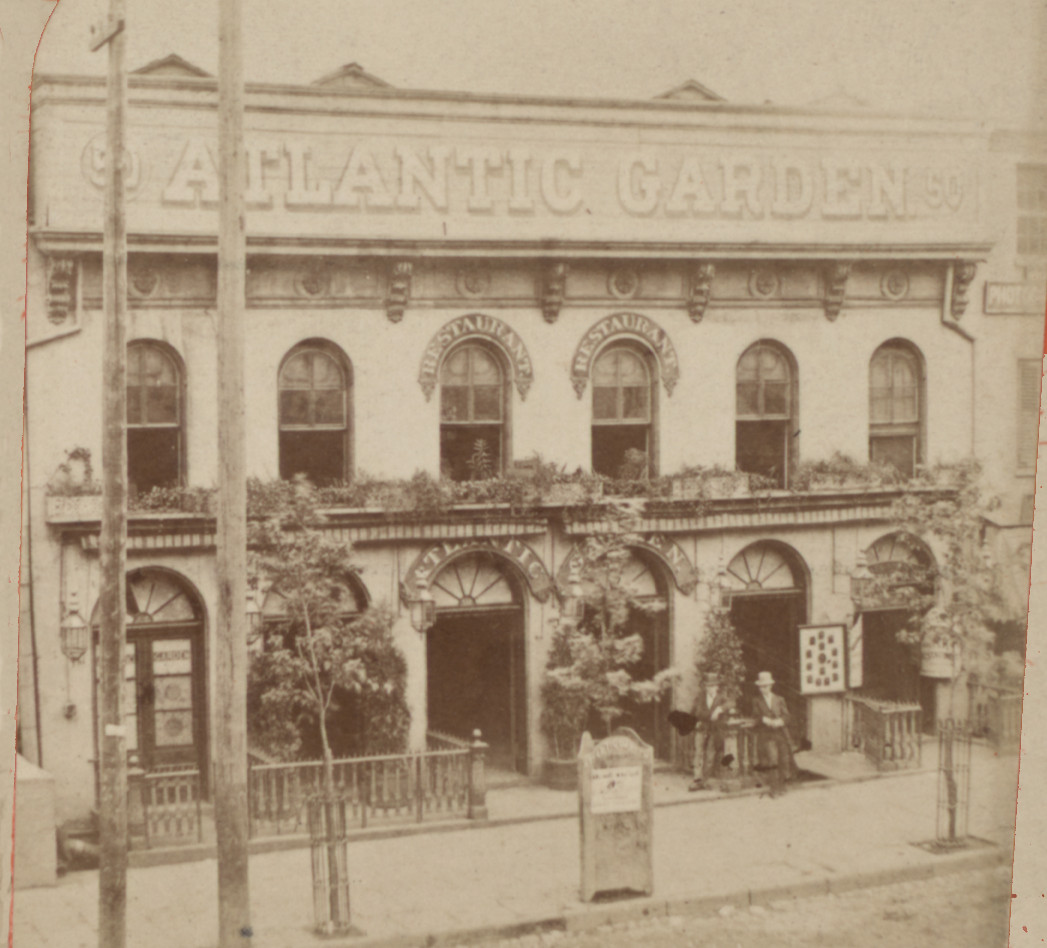
Atlantic Garden circa 1890

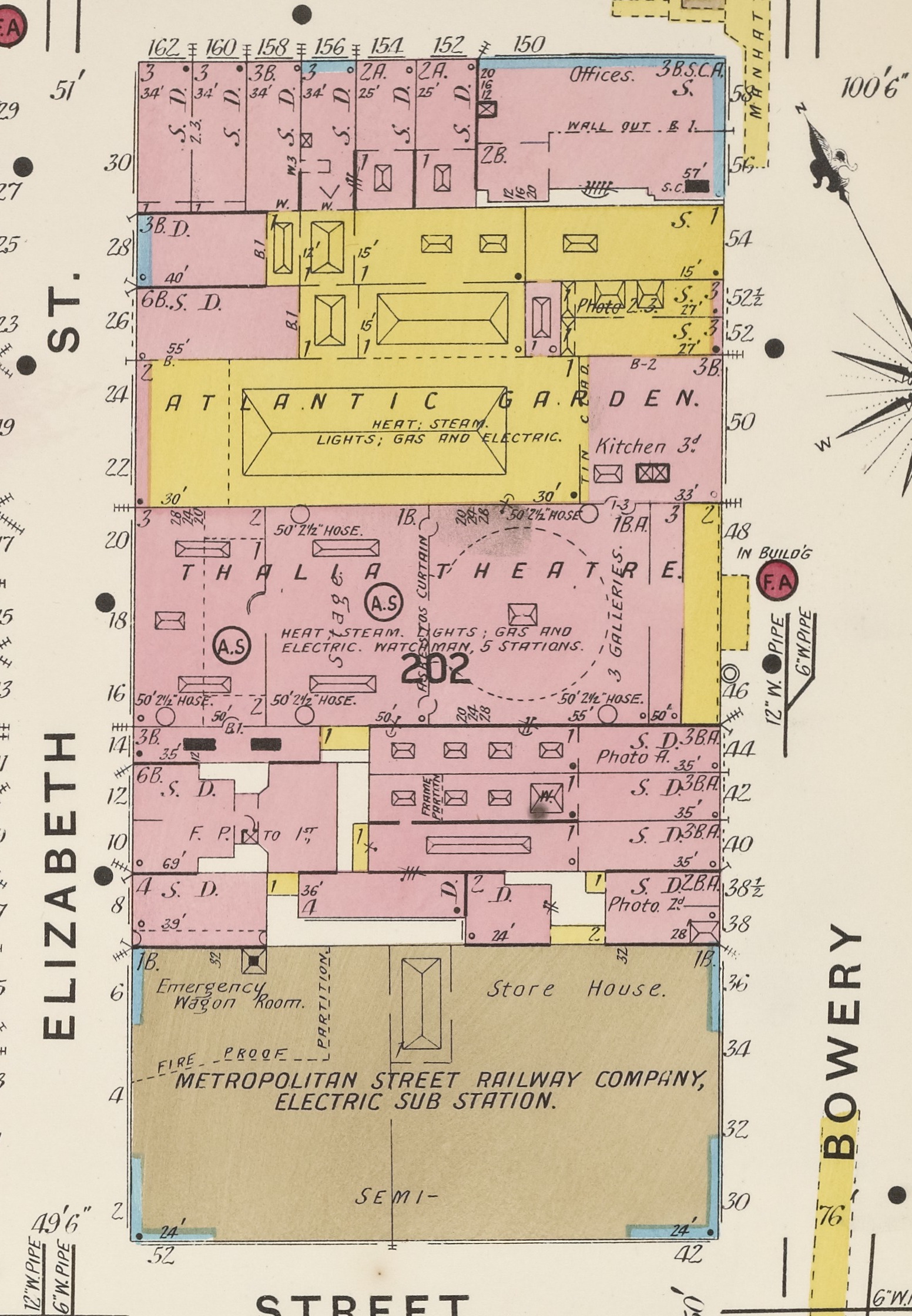
1905 map of the block between Elizabeth (west) & Bowery (east), Bayard (south) and Canal (north). The premises of the Atlantic Garden correspond roughly to the large yellow area.

The Atlantic Garden was a beer garden and music hall established by William Kramer in 1858 at what is now 50 Bowery in the Chinatown neighborhood of Manhattan in New York City. It was next to the Bowery Theatre, on the site of the Bull's Head Tavern (formerly headquarters for New York's cattle market) and the New York Hotel. The premises extended west to a secondary frontage on Elizabeth Street.

The Bowery Theatre was built as a fashionable theater, but by the 1850s it came to cater to immigrant groups; the Germans especially patronized Atlantic Garden, which featured a theater behind the beer hall, where the new entertainment of "variety" acts were presented along with popular music concerts. In 1910, following the neighborhood's changing dynamic, Atlantic Garden switched to presenting Yiddish theatre.

In 2013, the Chu family razed structures on the site to make way for a high-rise hotel. Although there were rumors that the site might have contained remnants of the old Bull's Head Tavern, an archeological excavation did not find any such evidence.
