= Brotherhood of the Union =

American nativist secret society

Brotherhood of the Union was an American nativism secret society. It was organized in 1850, in Philadelphia, Pennsylvania, by George Lippard. Important planks in its platform were: antagonism to the union of Church and State; maintenance of the public school system; "America for Americans", and the restriction of immigration. Its chief officers were called, respectively, "Supreme Washington", "Supreme Jefferson", and "Supreme Franklin". There was an auxiliary or branch society known as the Home Communion, to which members of the Brotherhood and their women relatives were eligible. The Brotherhood flourished principally in the States of Pennsylvania and New Jersey. Its membership was given as about 25,000 in 1907. While the Brotherhood was similar to the Order of United American Mechanics and the Patriotic Order Sons of America, it was the "premier nonpolitical land-reform organization of the 1850s".

== History ==
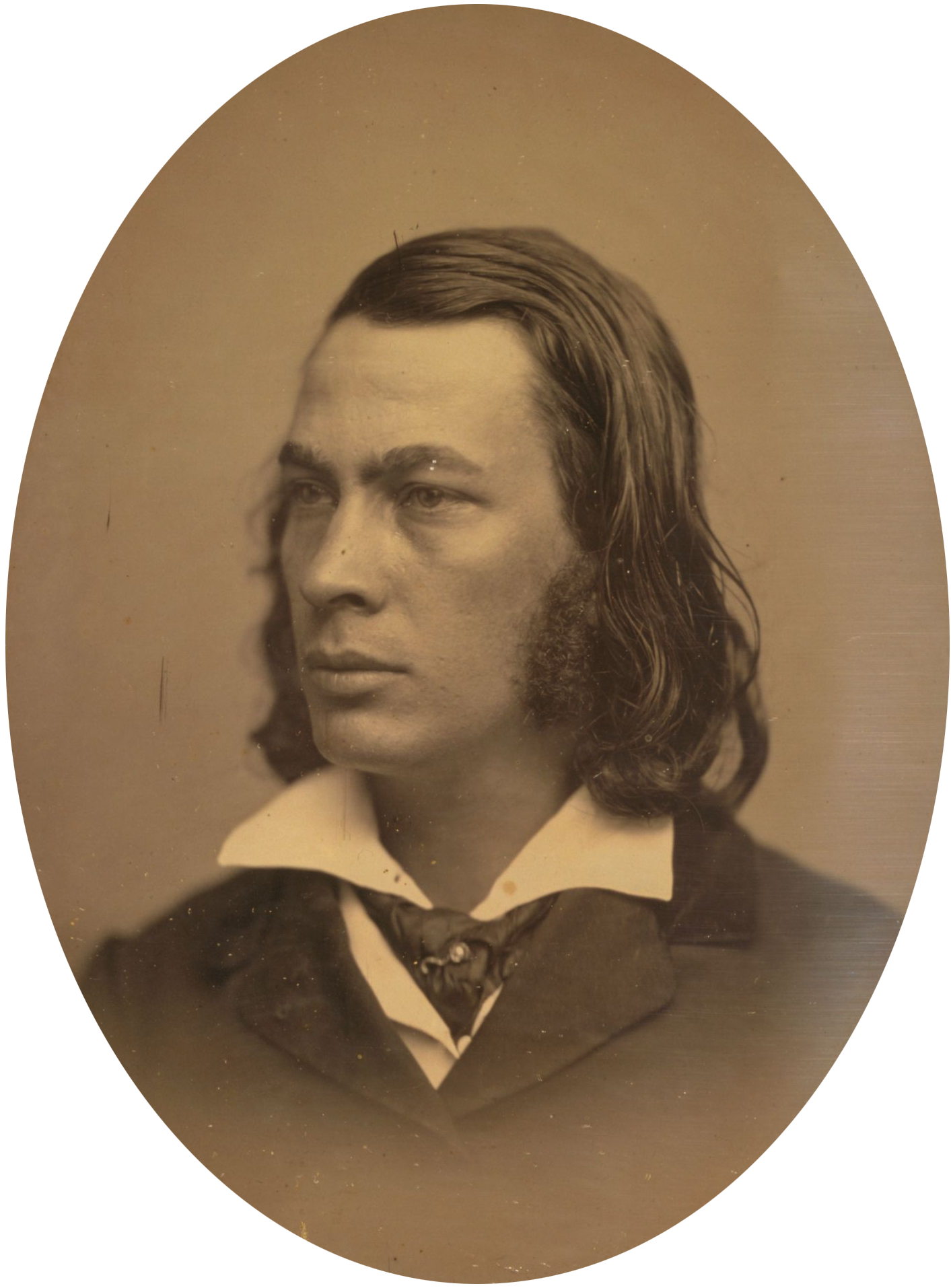
George Lippard (ca. 1850)

Following the organization of the patriotic American secret societies, the Order of United American Mechanics, and the Patriotic Order of United Sons of America, at Philadelphia in 1845 and 1847, respectively, came the Brotherhood of America, at the same city, in 1850 with similar purposes and characteristics. The latter, with the Senior and Junior Orders of United American Mechanics, and the Patriotic Order, Sons of America, constituted the four existing patriotic secret societies which survived the fate of the Sons of '76, or Order of the Star Spangled Banner, better known as the Know Nothing party, and later, the non-secret American party, which broke up on in the stormy campaign of 1856–60.

The Brotherhood was organized, with the motto, "Truth, Hope, and Love," by Lippard, for whose teachings and writings the society was formed.

The Brotherhood brought antagonism to union of church and state, maintenance of the public school system, "America for Americans," and restricted immigration down to a period following the Civil War, when they were apparently destined to be exploited again, in and out of the councils of these and of other and newer patriotic secret orders.

The government of the Brotherhood was similar to that of the Patriotic Order, Sons of America, with subordinate and State Circles, instead of Camps, and a Supreme Circle. It also had beneficiary features. A singular custom was that of calling its three chief officers, respectively, thus in the Supreme Circle they are addressed as Supreme Washington, Supreme Jefferson, and Supreme Franklin.

Total membership in the Brotherhood was about 25,000, its greatest strength being in Pennsylvania. There was also an auxiliary or branch of the society known as the Home Communion, to which members of the Brotherhood and woman relatives were eligible. Subordinate bodies were called Homes, and governing, State bodies, Grand Homes. The latter sent delegates of the Supreme Circle of the Brotherhood. The communions were strong in Pennsylvania eligible to membership. The society, while growing steadily, had the smallest membership of the four in the historical group of patriotic orders to which it was assigned.

== Publications ==
The White Banner was the official organ of the Brotherhood. It was also, in many respects, the vehicle for the expression of the opinions of the Editor, George Lippard, as an individual, without regard to his official connection with the Order.
