= Bowery Theatre =

Playhouse in Manhattan, New York (1826–1898)

- New York Theatre (1826); Bowery Theatre (1828); American Theatre, Bowery (c. 1840); Thalia Theatre (1879); Fay's Bowery Theatre (1929)
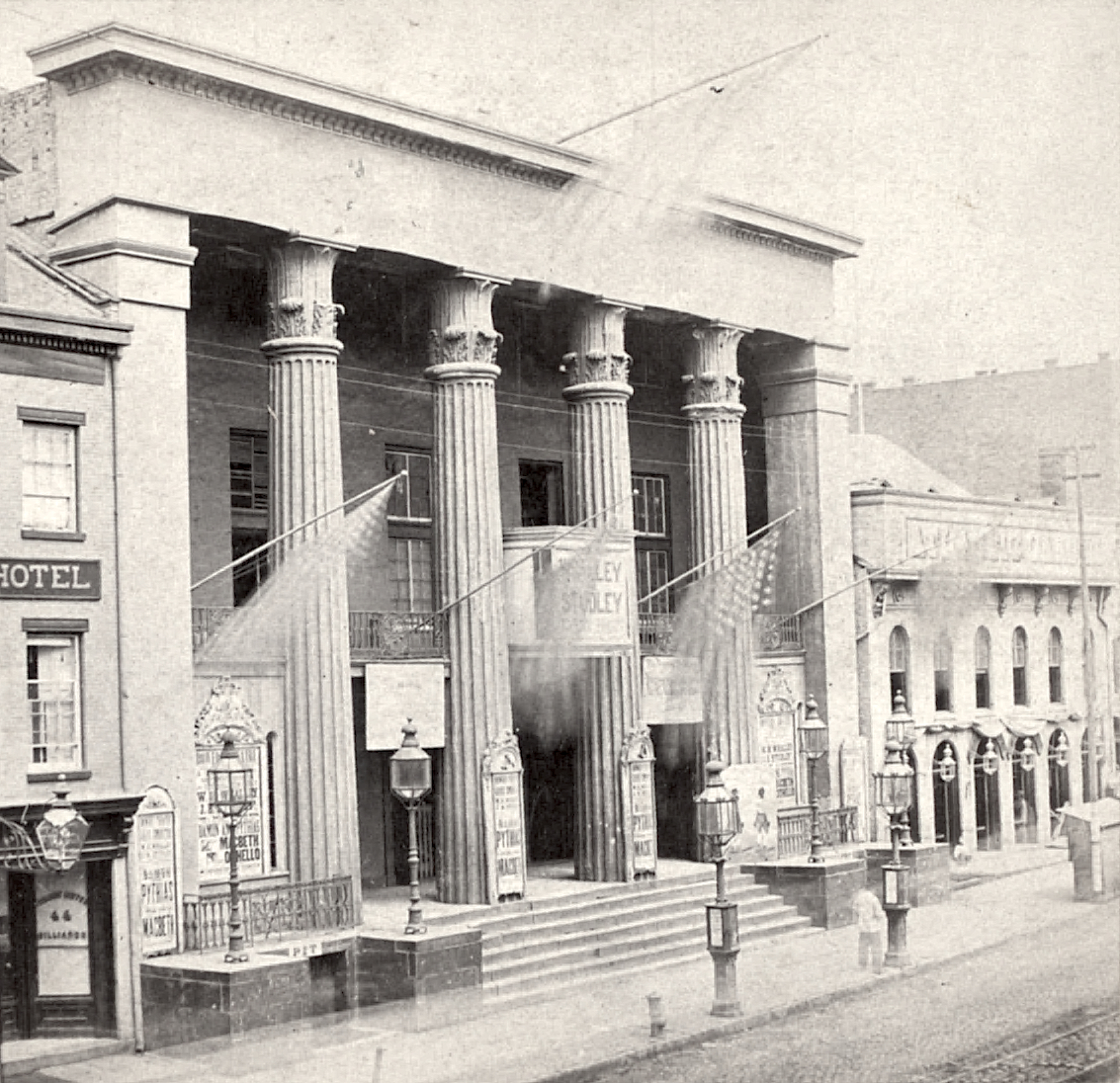
- Bowery Theatre in July 1867
- Interactive map of Bowery Theatre
- Address: 46 Bowery; New York; NY 10013
- Coordinates: 40.715891°N 73.996550°W

Construction
- Opened: August 4, 1845
- Demolished: June 5, 1929 (Fire)
- Architect: John M. Trimble

The Bowery Theatre was a playhouse on the Bowery on the Lower East Side of Manhattan, New York City. Although it was founded by rich families to compete with the upscale Park Theatre, the Bowery saw its most successful period under the populist, pro-American management of Thomas Hamblin in the 1830s and 1840s. By the 1850s, the theatre came to cater to immigrant groups such as the Irish, Germans, and Chinese. It burned down four times in 17 years, a fire in 1929 destroying it for good. Although the theatre's name changed several times (Thalia Theatre, Fay's Bowery Theatre, etc.), it was generally referred to as the "Bowery Theatre".

== Founding and early management ==
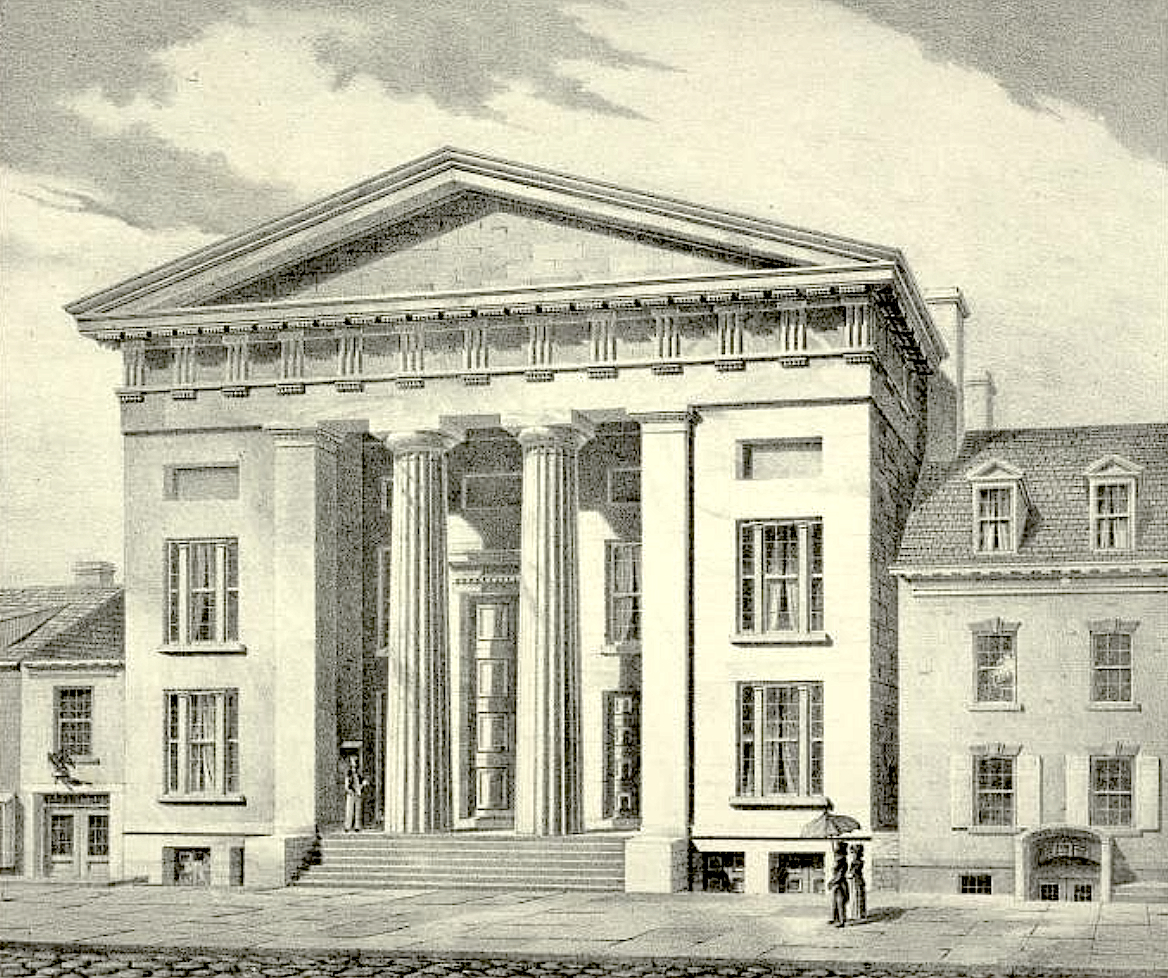
1826 New York Theatre, by architect Ithiel Town

By the mid-1820s, wealthy settler families in the new ward that was made fashionable by the opening of Lafayette Street, parallel to the Bowery, wanted easy access to fashionable high-class European drama, then only available at the Park Theatre. Under the leadership of Henry Astor, they formed the New York Association and bought the land where Astor's Bull's Head Tavern stood, facing the neighborhood and occupying the area between Elizabeth, Canal (then called Walker), and Bayard streets. They hired architect Ithiel Town to design the new venue.

Some notable investors included Samuel Laurence Gouverneur, son-in-law to President James Monroe, and James Alexander Hamilton, son of Alexander Hamilton.

The new playhouse, with its Neoclassical design, was more opulent than the Park, and it seated 3,500 people, making it the biggest theatre in the United States at the time. Frances Trollope compared it to the Park Theatre as "superior in beauty; it is indeed as pretty a theatre as I ever entered, perfect as to size and proportion, elegantly decorated, and the scenery and machinery equal to any in London...."

The Bowery Theatre opened on October 22, 1826, under the name New York Theatre, with the comedy The Road to Ruin by Thomas Holcroft, under the management of Charles A. Gilfert. New York Mayor Philip Hone spoke at the opening ceremony, imploring the theatre's intended upper-class audience: "It is therefore incumbent upon those whose standing in society enables them to control the opinions and direct the judgment of others, to encourage, by their countenance and support, a well-regulated theatre." Its first few seasons were devoted to ballet, opera, and high drama. The theatre was by this time quite fashionable, and the northward expansion of Manhattan gave the theatre access to a large patronage. The theatre burnt down on the evening of May 26, 1828, but was rebuilt by the architect Joseph Sera and reopened under the name Bowery Theatre on August 20, 1828. Gilfert's understanding of advertising was keen, but in 1829 the owners fired him.

== Hamblin's tenure ==
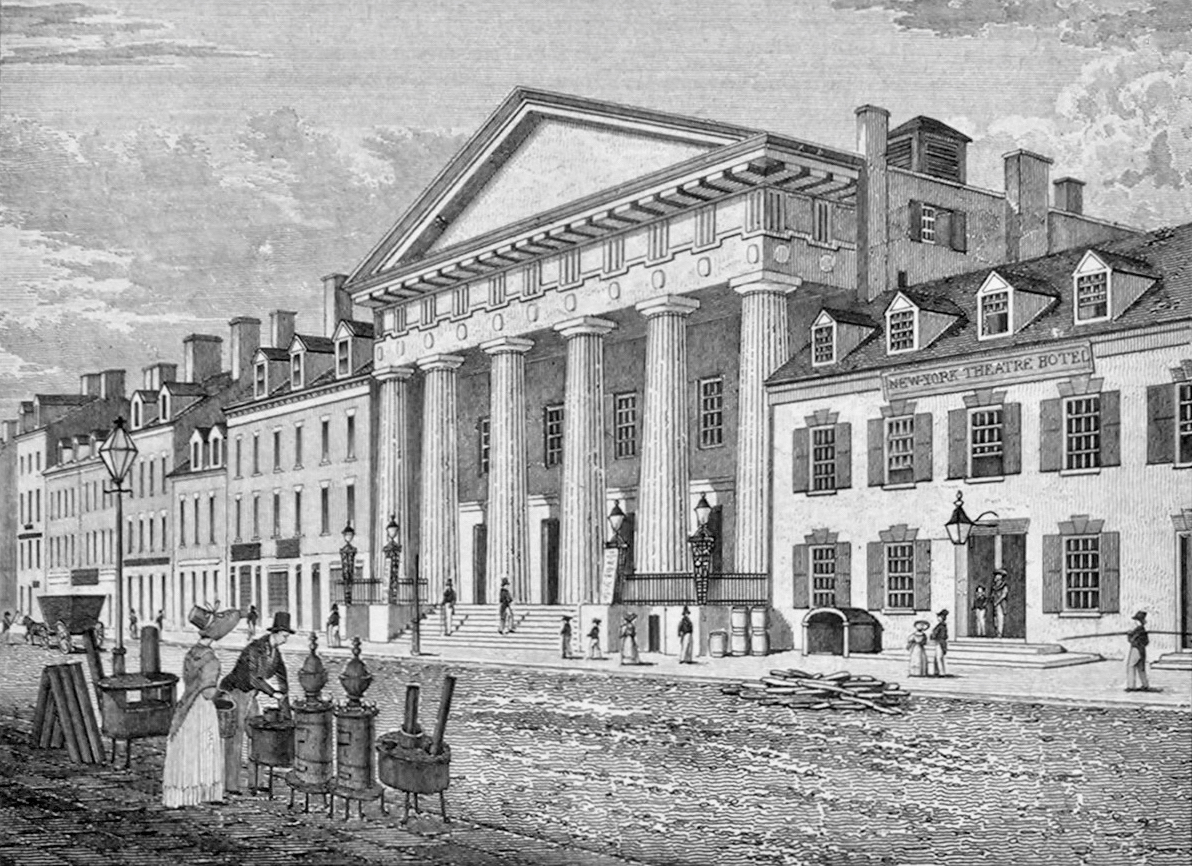
Bowery Theatre of 1828, from Bourne Views of New York (1830–31)

The owners hired Thomas Hamblin and James H. Hackett in August 1830 to manage the theatre. A month later, Hackett left Hamblin in complete control. After the Bowery burned down later that year, Hamblin rebuilt. He then took the theatre in a decidedly different direction for what would be its most innovative and successful period.

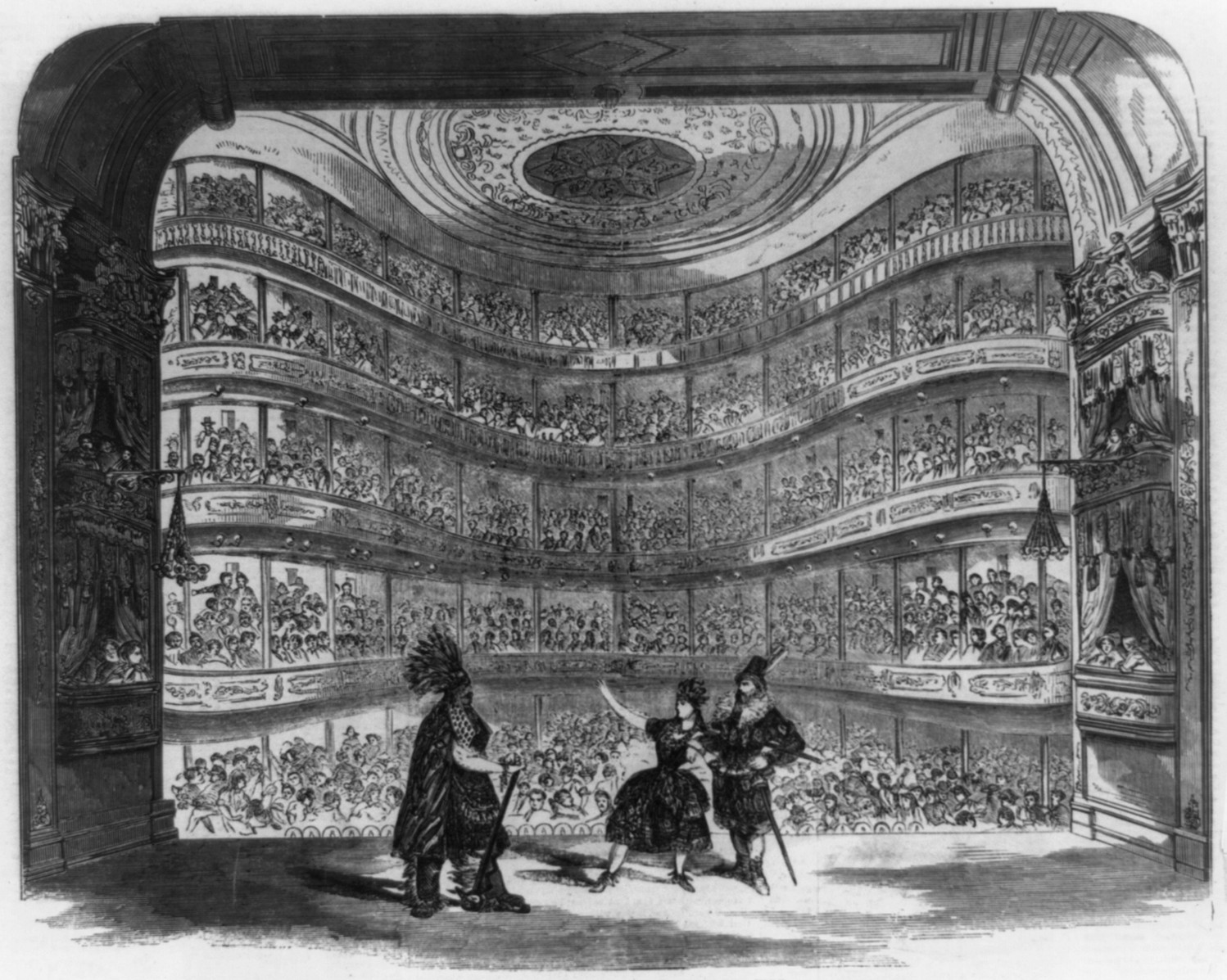
Bowery Theatre of 1845, shown in 1856

American theatres stratified in the Jacksonian Era, and the Bowery emerged as the home of American nativists and populist causes, placing it in direct contrast to the Park Theatre's cultivated image of traditional European high culture. This was partially the result of an anti-British theatre riot at the Park; Hamblin renamed the playhouse "the American Theatre, Bowery" in reaction. Hamblin hired unknown American actors and playwrights and allowed them to play for long runs of up to a month. Before 1843, early blackface performers such as George Washington Dixon and Thomas D. Rice played there frequently, and acts such as J. B. Booth, Edwin Forrest, Louisa Lane Drew, and Frank Chanfrau also gained renown on the Bowery's stage. George L. Fox and his pantomime became the most popular act at the Bowery until after the Civil War. Bowery productions also debuted or popularized a number of new character types, including the Bowery B'hoy, the Yankee, the Frontiersman, and the blackface Negro.

The pro-Americanism of the Bowery's audience came to a head during the Farren Riots of 1834. Farren, the Bowery's British-born stage manager, had reportedly made anti-American comments and fired an American actor. Protesters reacted by attacking the homes, businesses, and churches of abolitionists and blacks in New York City and then storming the theatre on July 9. Farren apologized for his comments, and George Washington Dixon sang popular songs to quell the rioters.

Hamblin defied conventions of theatre as high culture by booking productions that appealed to working-class patrons and by advertising them extensively according to Gilfert's model. Animal acts, blackface minstrel shows, and melodrama enjoyed the most frequent billings, and hybrid forms, such as melodramas about dogs saving their human masters, became unprecedented successes. Spectacular productions with advanced visual effects, including water and fire, featured prominently. Hamblin also innovated by using gas lighting in lieu of candles and kerosene lamps. The Bowery Theatre earned the nickname "The Slaughterhouse" for its low-class offerings, and terms like "Bowery melodrama" and "Bowery actors" were coined to characterize the new type of theatre.

In the spring of 1834, Hamblin began buying shares in the theatre from the New York Association; he had enough to control the enterprise completely within 18 months. By the time the Bowery burned again in September 1836, it was the most popular playhouse in New York City, despite steep increases in competition (the Bowery Amphitheatre was right across the street). Visual spectacle had become such an integral part of its appeal that Hamblin claimed $5,000 in wardrobe losses from the fire. Hamblin bought out the remaining shares in the theatre and rented the site to W. E. Dinneford and Thomas Flynn, who rebuilt. When this interim Bowery burned down on February 18, 1838, Hamblin replaced it with a bigger and more opulent structure, which opened in May 1839.

Through Hamblin's actions, working-class theatre emerged as a form in its own right, and melodrama became the most popular form of American theatre. Low-class patrons such as Bowery b'hoys and g'hals predominated in the audience. The Spirit of the Times described the Bowery's patrons:

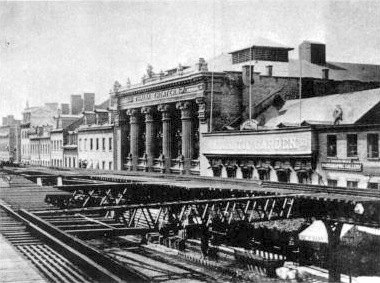
Thalia Theatre, which was destroyed in 1929

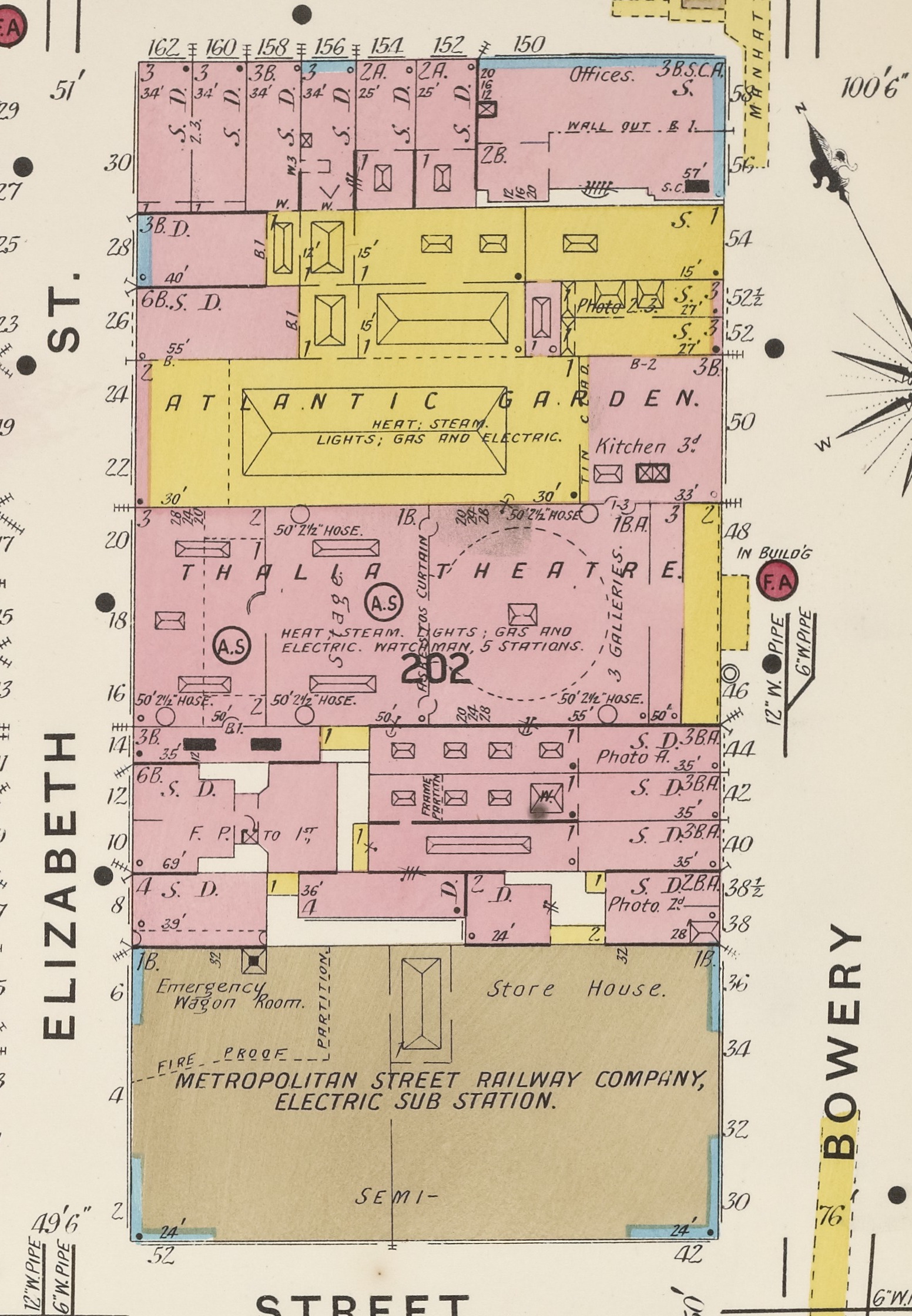
1905 map of the block between Elizabeth (west) & Bowery (east), Bayard (south) and Canal (north), showing the Thalia Theatre just south of large yellow area representing the Atlantic Garden.

By reasonable computation there were about 300 persons on the stage and wings alone—soldiers in fatigue dresses—officers with side arms—a few jolly tars, and a number of 'apple-munching urchins.' The scene was indescribably ludicrous. Booth played [Richard III] in his best style, and was really anxious to make a hit, but the confusion incidental to such a crowd on the stage, occasioned constant and most humorous interruptions. It was every thing or any thing, but a tragedy. In the scene with Lady Anne, a scene so much admired for its address, the gallery spectators amused themselves by throwing pennies and silver pieces on the stage, which occasioned an immense scramble among the boys, and they frequently ran between King Richard and Lady Anne, to snatch a stray copper. In the tent scene, so solemn and so impressive, several curious amateurs went up to the table, took up the crown, poised the heavy sword, and examined all the regalia with great care, while Richard was in agony from the terrible dream; and when the scene changed, discovering the ghosts of King Henry, Lady Anne and children, it was difficult to select them from the crowd who thrust their faces and persons among the Royal shadows. The Battle of Bosworth Field capped the climax—the audience mingled with the soldiers and raced across the stage, to the shouts of the people, the roll of the drums and the bellowing of the trumpets; and when the fight between Richard and Richmond came on, they made a ring round the combattants to see fair play, and kept them at if for nearly a quarter of an hour by "Shrewsberry clock."

Some sources even suggest that patrons engaged in sexual behavior in the lobbies and boxes. Understandably, Hamblin was careful to remain in this crowd's good graces. For example, he regularly offered use of the Bowery Theatre for the annual firemen's ball. Only the Chatham Garden Theatre boasted a rowdier audience.

Profits were harder to come by in the 1840s, as more playhouses sprung up in New York. Hamblin staged more effects-driven melodrama and later increased bookings of circus acts, minstrel shows, and other variety entertainments. The Bowery burned down once more in April 1845. This time, Hamblin had fire insurance, and he rebuilt with an eye toward appealing to a more upscale patronage and to staging more spectacular melodrama. The theatre now seated 4,000 and with a stage 126 feet (38 m) square, secured its place as one of the largest playhouses in the world. The architect and builder of the new theatre was John M. Trimble. Hamblin left the management to A. W. Jackson, though Jackson and later managers largely upheld Hamblin's emphasis on melodrama and visual splendor. Hamblin died in January 1853, and the theatre remained in his family until 1867.

Successful plays of Hamblin's tenure included:

- The Elephant of Siam and the Fire Fiend by Samuel Beazley, which featured the elephant Mademoiselle D'Jeck and ran for 18 consecutive performances in early 1831.
- Mazeppa, Or, The Wild Horse of Ukraine, which debuted on July 22, 1833, and had 43 consecutive performances, an astounding feat for its time.
- Nick of the Woods, adapted by Louisa Honor de Medina from the popular novel, debuted in February 1838, and reappeared after a theatre fire in May 1839 starring Joseph Proctor.
- Putnam, the Iron Son of '76 by Nathaniel Bannister. This play debuted on August 5, 1844, and ran for 78 consecutive performances.

== Later management ==
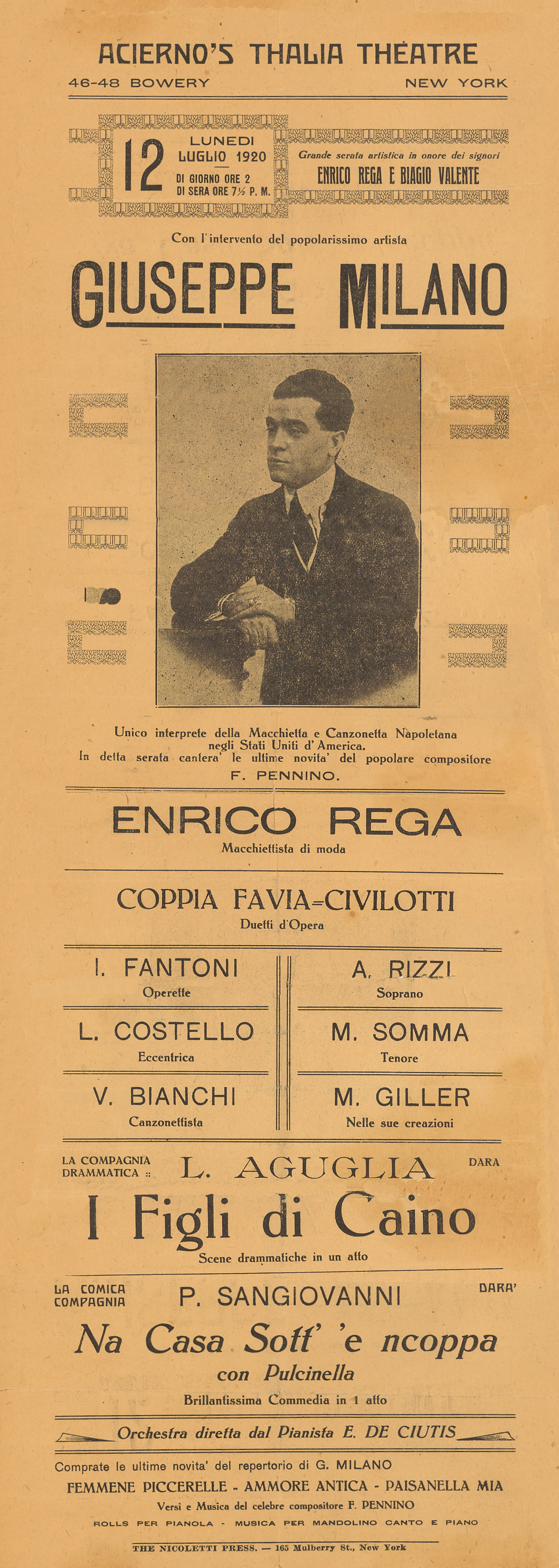

By the middle of the 19th century, immigrant groups, notably the Irish, began populating the Bowery neighborhood. They came to form a significant portion of the Bowery's audience, mostly in the low-price gallery section. In order to cater to them, the theatre offered plays by James Pilgrim and other Irish playwrights. Meanwhile, the Bowery emerged as the theatrical center for New York's Lower East Side.

In 1860 Gilbert R. Spalding and Charles J. Rogers took a three-year lease on the Bowery Theatre, which they renovated and fitted with a movable stage so as to be able to cater for both equestrian and dramatic performances. Among their acts were the trapeze artists François and Auguste Siegrist and the tight-rope dancer Marietta Zanfretta. In January 1861 they staged the spectacular Tippoo Sahib, or, the Storming of Seringapatam with many trick transformations including a vast enemy encampment, an Indian jungle near the Taj Mahal and a bombardment by British forces with a charge on foot and horse.

Germans Gustav Amberg, Heinrich Conried, and Mathilde Cottrelly converted the Bowery into the Thalia Theatre in 1879, offering primarily German theatre during their ownership. In 1891, Yiddish theatre became the predominant attraction. Italian vaudeville succeeded this, followed by Chinese vaudeville.

In 1894, Maria Roda addressed a large rally at the Thalia Theater celebrating Emma Goldman's release from prison. Although Roda spoke in Italian and Goldman understood none of it, she was moved by Roda's charismatic presence. She wrote, "Maria's strange beauty and the music of her speech roused the whole assembly to tensest enthusiasm. Maria proved a veritable ray of sunlight to me." She then pledged to become Maria Roda's "teacher, friend, comrade."

In the 1910–20's, it was owned and managed by Feliciano Acierno and called "Acierno's Thalia Theatre". Acierno brought much of the Italian vaudeville to the stage.

"Fay's Bowery Theatre" burned down on June 5, 1929, under Chinese management and was never rebuilt.
