= Nick of the Woods =

1837 novel by Robert Montgomery Bird

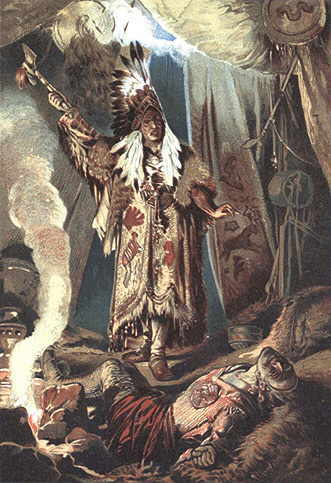
- 1883 illustration from German edition of novel Die Gefahren der Wildnis by Hermann Vogel
- Author: Robert Montgomery Bird
- Language: English
- Publisher: Carey, Lea and Blanchard
- Publication date: March 1837 (United States)
- Publication place: United States
- Pages: Two vol. (1837 ed.) (240 pg. Vol. I; 246 pg. Vol. II); 1837 English ed. is Vol. I-III

Nick of the Woods; or, The Jibbenainosay is an 1837 novel by American author Robert Montgomery Bird. Noted today for its savage depiction of Native Americans, it was Bird's most successful novel and a best-seller at the time of its release.

== Publication ==
The novel was eventually published in twenty-three editions in English, and four translations, including a best-selling German translation by Gustav Höcker. The long popularity of the novel is evidenced by the fact that Mark Twain referenced the main character of the book in 1883's Life on the Mississippi, presuming the audience would know the reference.

== Plot and reception ==
The novel is set in Kentucky in the 1780s and revolves around the mysterious figure of "Nick of the Woods", dressed as a monster, who seeks to avenge the death of his family by killing numerous Indians, carving a cross on the body of all he slays. "Nick" is revealed to be Nathan Slaughter, a Quaker by day who should by nature and creed avoid all violence. Bird's brutal depiction of Native Americans (the Shawnee) was very hostile, and in part a reaction to the more positive representation of Indians by James Fenimore Cooper in the Leatherstocking Tales. This heightened level of violence on the American frontier may have been inspired by Logan (1822) by John Neal.

The novel has been called a "prominent example of the American Gothic form." The Columbia Companion to American History on Film, which dubs Nathan Slaughter "a one-man genocide squad", also credits the novel for popularizing the mode of unintelligent Indian speaking ("Me Inju-man! ... Me kill all white man!") used by many later authors and in movies.

== Adaptations ==
The novel was also adapted for the stage in at least three versions, the most popular one by Louisa Medina. The Medina version debuted at the Bowery Theatre in New York on February 5, 1838, to great success, although a fire burned down the house after two weeks. It returned to the Bowery in 1839 when it re-opened. The role of Nick became a lifetime starring role for actor Joseph Proctor. In his introduction to Victorian Melodramas (1976), James L. Smith called the play "the most successful American melodrama for more than half a century."
