= The Quaker City, or The Monks of Monk Hall =

1845 novel by George Lippard

The Quaker City; or; The Monks of Monk Hall
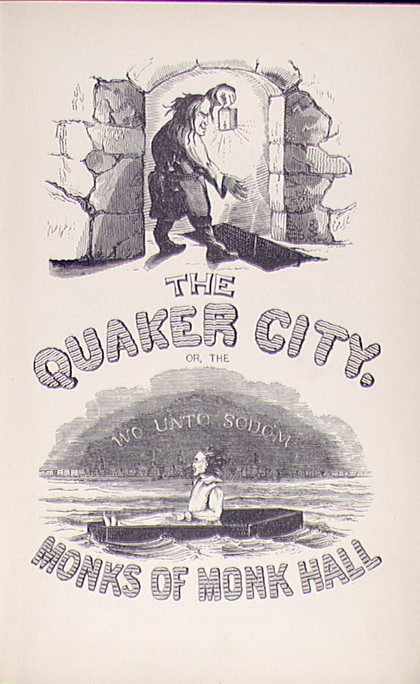
- Illustrated cover by F. O. C. Darley
- Author: George Lippard
- Publication date: 1845

The Quaker City; or, The Monks of Monk Hall is a city mystery novel by Philadelphia writer George Lippard, first published in 1845.

== Plot summary ==
The Quaker City describes four main characters during the course of three days and nights. The story is set mostly in a Philadelphia mansion named "Monk Hall", which serves as a private gentlemen's club and is also secretly a brothel and opium den patronized by some of the city's most respected citizens. The main characters engage in various acts of debauchery, including the attempt at deflowering a young maiden. Devil-Bug, one of the book's most memorable characters, serves as the hall's caretaker and doorman.

== Inspiration ==
The Quaker City is based partly on the March 1843 New Jersey trial of Singleton Mercer. Mercer was accused of the murder of Mahlon Hutchinson Heberton aboard the Philadelphia-Camden ferry vessel Dido on February 10, 1843. Mercer alleged that Heberton, only five days before he shot him, had lured his sixteen-year old sister into a brothel and raped her at gunpoint. He entered a plea of insanity and was found not guilty. The trial occurred only two months after Edgar Allan Poe's short story "The Tell-Tale Heart", a story based on other murder trials employing the insanity defense; Mercer's defense attorney acknowledged the "object of ridicule" which an insanity defense had become. Nonetheless, a verdict of not-guilty was rendered after less than an hour of jury deliberation, and the family and the lawyer of young Mercer were greeted by a cheering crowd while disembarking from the same Philadelphia-Camden ferry line on which the killing occurred. Lippard employed the seduction aspect of the trial as a metaphor for the oppression of the helpless.

== Publication history ==
The Quaker City was the best-selling novel in America before Uncle Tom's Cabin. When it appeared in print during 1845, it sold 60,000 copies during its first year and at least 10,000 copies throughout the next decade. Its success made Lippard one of the best-paid American writers of the 1840s, earning $3,000 to $4,000 a year.

Lippard took advantage of the popularity of his novel The Quaker City to establish his own weekly periodical, also named The Quaker City. He advertised it as "A Popular Journal, devoted to such matters of Literature and news as will interest the great mass of readers". Its first issue was published December 30, 1848.

== Analysis ==
In The Quaker City; or; The Monks of Monks Hall, Lippard intended to expose the hypocrisy of the Philadelphia elite as well as the darker underside of American capitalism and urbanization. Lippard's Philadelphia is populated with parsimonious bankers, foppish drunkards, adulterers, sadistic murderers, reverend rakes, and confidence men, all of whom the author depicts as potential threats to the Republic. It is considered the first muckraking novel.

== Critical response ==
Many people were offended by the story's lurid elements. The book may also have prompted new laws, such as New York's 1849 enactment of an anti-seduction law.

The Monks of Monk Hall outraged some readers with its lingering descriptions of "heaving bosoms" but such descriptions also drew readers and increased book sales. A stage version was prepared but banned in Philadelphia for fear of riots.
