= Bull's Head Tavern =

Former pub on Bowery, Manhattan, New York City.

Coordinates: 40.739435°N 73.982638°W

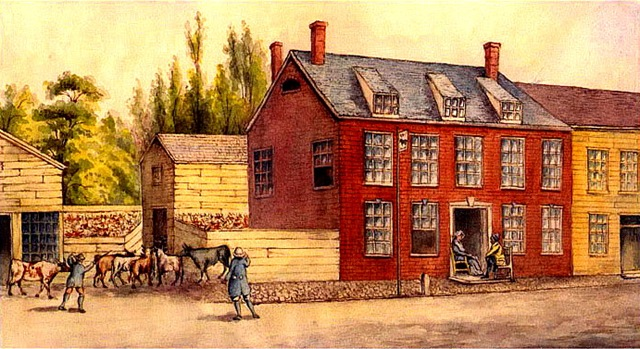
A painting of the Bull's Head Tavern off of the Bowery in Manhattan, New York, during the American Revolutionary War in 1783

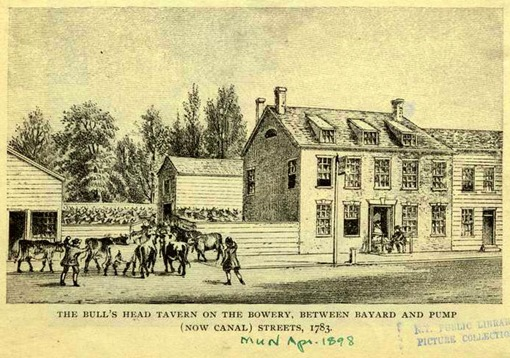
An illustration of the above painting of the Bull's Head Tavern

Bull's Head Tavern was an establishment located on Bowery, a street in Manhattan, New York City.

== History ==
The tavern opened around 1750. It was initially used as a recruitment center for Loyalists fighting for the British in the American Revolutionary War. It was also famous for being the place where George Washington established his temporary headquarters in November 1783. The tavern was later owned by local butcher Henry Astor, the patriarch of the notable Astor family.

In 1813, the tavern relocated uptown to Third Avenue and East 23rd Street, where it survived into the 1830s. A modern tavern of the same name operated at this location from 1996 to April 2015. using the same bull's head logo as the original establishment.
