= 1834 in sports =

1834 in sports describes the year's events in world sport.

== Boxing ==
Events

- Still trying to fight Jem Ward for the English Championship, James Burke travels from town to town giving boxing exhibitions to raise the money. Ward, who refuses to fight Burke, keeps raising the stakes to avoid the fight. The question of the title remains unresolved with Ward officially retired and Burke under a stigma following the death of Simon Byrne in 1833.

== Chess ==
- The La Bourdonnais – McDonnell chess matches take place at the Westminster Chess Club in London. They are a series of matches between Louis-Charles Mahé de La Bourdonnais of France and Alexander McDonnell of Ireland. The matches confirm La Bourdonnais as the leading chess player in the world.

== Cricket ==
Events

- Fuller Pilch reaches his peak as a top-class batsman, scoring 551 runs at an unprecedented average of 61.22, an outstanding achievement on the unpredictable pitches of his time.

England

- Most runs – Fuller Pilch 551 @ 61.22 (HS 153*)
- Most wickets – William Lillywhite 38 (BB 7–?)

== Horse racing ==
England

- 1,000 Guineas Stakes – May-day
- 2,000 Guineas Stakes – Glencoe
- The Derby – Plenipotentiary
- The Oaks – Pussy
- St. Leger Stakes – Touchstone

== Rowing ==
The Boat Race

- The Oxford and Cambridge Boat Race is not held this year
