= James Wharton (boxer) =

English boxer

James "Jem" Wharton
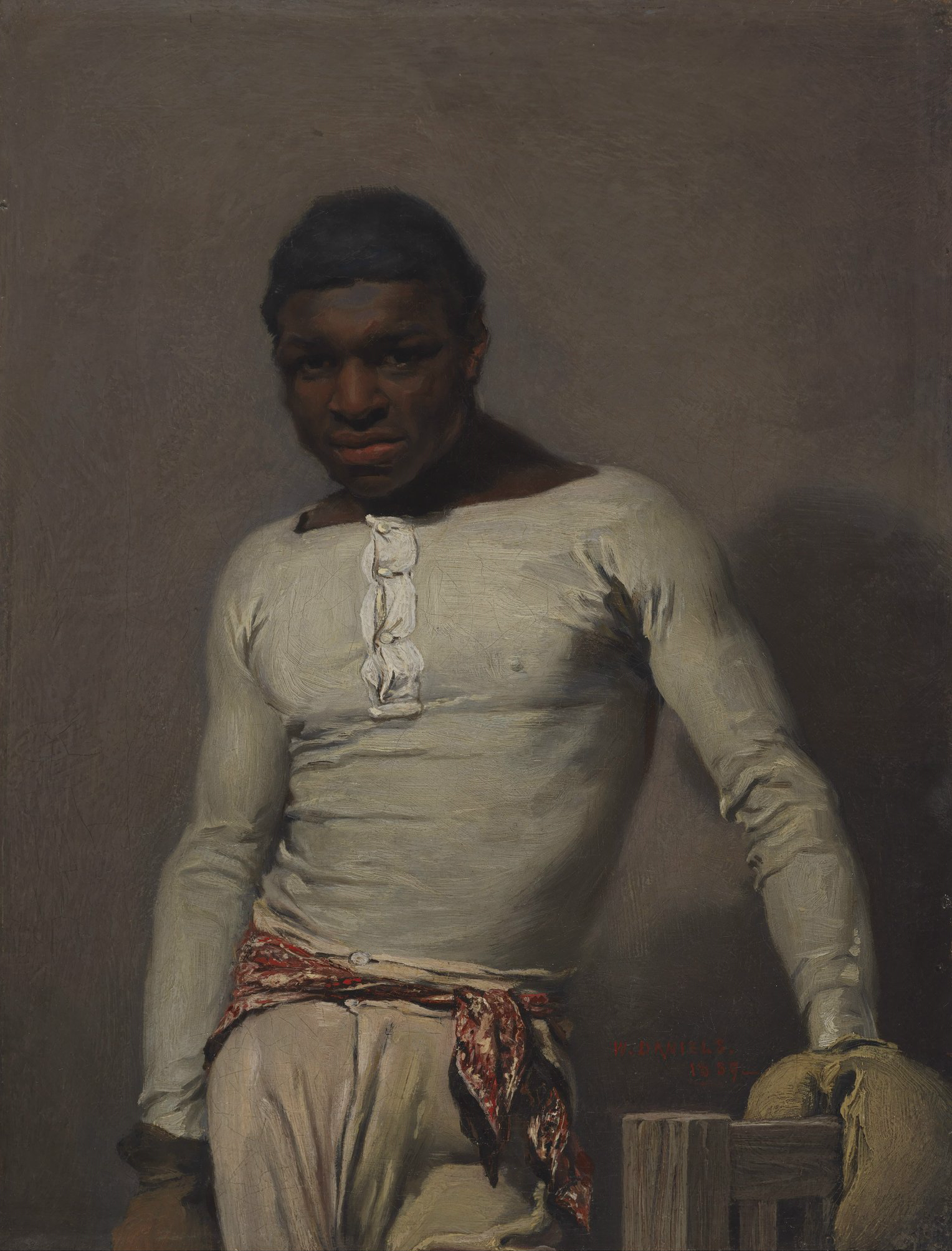
- Portrait of Jem Wharton (1839) by William Daniels

Personal information
- Nicknames: Young Molineaux; The Moroccan Prince; Jemmy the Black; Jem Molyneaux
- Nationality: English
- Born: 3 March 1813 London or Tangiers
- Died: 25 April 1856 (aged 43) Liverpool, England

Boxing career
- Stance: Bareknuckle

Boxing record
- Total fights: 9
- Wins: 8
- Losses: 0
- Draws: 1

James "Jem" Wharton (3 March 1813 — 25 April 1856) was an English boxer. Wharton boxed from 1833 to 1840 and had a career record of eight wins and one draw. He was posthumously inducted into the International Boxing Hall of Fame in 2012.

== Early life ==
Wharton's early life is unclear. During his boxing career he described himself as being born in Tangier, Morocco, on 3 March 1813, and that his mother was a peasant and his father was a sailor. However, in the 1851 census, Wharton gave London as his place of birth. Wharton said that he started working as a cabin boy on a ship called the Hopewell at the age of twelve, which is where he began boxing.

== Career ==
Wharton fought multiple challengers in the early 1830s while working on the Hopewell. One of Wharton's earliest wins was against the cook of the Hopewell who accused him of stealing food. He then went to London to train under retired fighter Jem Burn. Wharton won his first three career fights against Tom McKeevor in 1833, "the Herefordshire Pippin" Evans in 1834, and "the Hammersmith Cowboy" Jack Wilsden in 1835. After the cancellation of an 1835 match against Nick Ward, Wharton toured with Deaf Burke. Later in the year, he won a match against Bill Fisher.

In 1836, Wharton had his only draw in his career against Tom Britton. During the match, fans of Britton threw things at Wharton and threatened him. Wharton's match against Britton lasted over four hours with 200 rounds before a draw was called. After the match, Wharton toured with Deaf Burke's trainer, Tommy Roundhead. In 1837, Wharton went to Liverpool, England to face Harry Preston. Wharton won the match when Preston was rendered unconscious from a throw. Throughout 1837, Wharton won matches against Sandy MacNeish in Scotland and William Renwick in England. In 1839, Wharton won a rematch against Renwick. In 1840, Wharton fought against John Lane. While Wharton almost lost to Lane by a chokehold, Wharton defeated Lane and won his final match.

Wharton retired undefeated in 1840. He went on to work as a trainer and operated a pub in Liverpool.

== Awards and honors ==
Wharton was inducted posthumously into the International Boxing Hall of Fame in 2012.

== Death ==
On 25 April 1856, Wharton died in Liverpool from complications related to tuberculosis.
