= 1829 in sports =

1829 in sports describes the year's events in world sport.

== Boxing ==
Events

- 29 March — Jem Ward fails to take part in a scheduled bout with Simon Byrne and so is held to have forfeited the Championship of England, which falls to Byrne by default.

== Cricket ==
Events

- The earliest known reference to cricket in Worcestershire occurs in 1829.

England

- Most runs – 265 apiece by Jem Broadbridge @ 18.92 (HS 52) and William Searle @ 20.38 (HS 87)
- Most wickets – William Lillywhite 42 (BB 8–?)

== Horse racing ==
England

- 1,000 Guineas Stakes – Young Mouse
- 2,000 Guineas Stakes – Patron
- The Derby – Frederick
- The Oaks – Green Mantle
- St. Leger Stakes – Rowton

== Rowing ==
The Boat Race

- 10 February — Cambridge University Boat Club resolves to challenge Oxford University Boat Club to race "each in an eight-oared boat during the ensuing Easter vacation."
- 10 June — The first Oxford and Cambridge Boat Race is held on the River Thames at Henley-on-Thames in Oxfordshire and won by Oxford. The event is highly popular with contemporary newspaper reports claiming crowds of twenty thousand travelled to watch. The Boat Race will subsequently be contested upstream in London and local racing will foster the Henley Royal Regatta.

== Bibliography ==
- Rowland Bowen, Cricket: A History of its Growth and Development, Eyre & Spottiswoode, 1970
