= 1797 in sports =

1797 in sports describes the year's events in world sport.

== Boxing ==
Events

- 22 August — Jack Bartholomew defeated Tom Owen in 26 rounds at Moulsey Hurst to claim the Championship of England. Bartholomew held the title until 1800.

== Cricket ==
Events

- Marylebone Cricket Club (MCC) enjoyed great success on the field, the team winning nine of its eleven matches.

England

- Most runs – Lord Frederick Beauclerk 758
- Most wickets – Lord Frederick Beauclerk 66

== Horse racing ==
England

- The Derby – colt by Fidget
- The Oaks – Nike
- St Leger Stakes – Lounger
