= Salcey Green =

Area of farm and woodland in England

Coordinates: 52.1342°N 0.8216°W

Salcey Green is an area of farm and wood land within the parish of Hanslope in the Borough of Milton Keynes, England. In 1830 it was the scene of an infamous bare-knuckle fight between boxers Simon Byrne and Alexander McKay that resulted in McKay's death.
