= 1798 in sports =

1798 in sports describes the year's events in world sport.

== Boxing ==
Events

- Jack Bartholomew retained his English Championship title but no fights involving him are recorded in 1798.

== Cricket ==
Events

- With inter-county fixtures not being played again until 1825, the records show a considerable increase in matches played by town clubs rather than county teams.

England

- Most runs – Lord Frederick Beauclerk 369
- Most wickets – Thomas Boxall 42

== Horse racing ==
England

- The Derby – Sir Harry
- The Oaks – Bellissima
- St Leger Stakes – Symmetry
