= Tom Spring =

English bare-knuckle fighter (1795–1851)

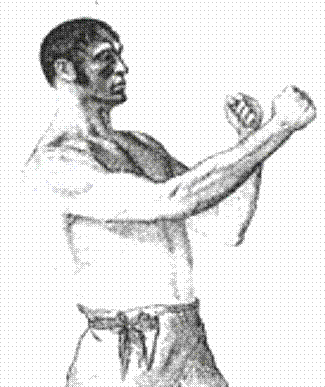
Tom Spring c. 1821

Tom Spring (born Thomas Winter) (22 February 1795 – 20 August 1851) was an English bare-knuckle fighter. He was champion of England from 1822 until his retirement in 1824. After his retirement he became landlord of the Castle Inn at Holborn in London, where he arranged the patronage and contracts of many of the major boxing events of the period while overseeing fair play in the ring.

== Early years ==
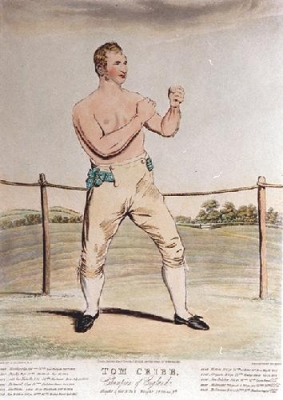
Spring's mentor Tom Cribb circa 1810

Spring was born at Witchend in Fownhope, Herefordshire on 22 February 1795. His true surname was "Winter", which he changed to Spring when he became a professional boxer. His first career was as a butcher, the trade in which he was employed when he had his first known fight in 1812, against John Hollands. He had been encouraged to box from a young age by his father, who had constructed a sand bag for him to train with. Later his father was jailed for debt, which destroyed Spring's relationship with him. In 1814 Spring met the legendary champion Tom Cribb who was staying nearby. Cribb was impressed by Spring's prowess, and persuaded him to go to London under his patronage; this was the beginning of Spring's boxing career. That year, Spring travelled to Mordiford and won a fight in 11 rounds, after which he won a £3 stake.

== Boxing ==
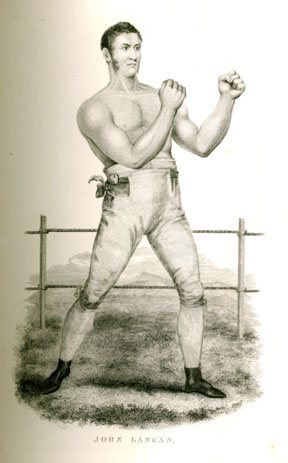
The Irish boxer Jack Langan who fought Spring twice, losing on both occasions

Spring is considered one of the most scientific of the early English boxers, an approach that set him apart from most of his contemporaries. Not possessing a strong punch he honed a fine defense, and a powerful left hook.

Spring's first fight in the Prize Ring was with a Yorkshireman named Stringer, the bout taking place on 9 September 1817 at Moulsey Hurst. After 29 rounds in 39 minutes, Spring won by knocking out his opponent.

Aged 23 Spring twice fought the very experienced Ned Painter, winning the first bout and losing the second. His defeat of Jack Carter in 1819 earned him some notoriety, and he toured the country giving exhibition matches with the reigning English champion Tom Cribb. On Cribb's public retirement at the Fives Court on 15th May 1822 he handed over the championship title to Spring. To defend the title Spring offered to fight anyone in England. No one challenged him until 1823, when he fought Bill Neat. Neat referred to Spring as a "lady’s maid fighter" because of his weak punch. The fight lasted just 37 minutes, with Spring victorious after knocking Neat down in the first round and cutting him severely in the second. This victory ensured that Spring was recognized as the champion of England.

In January 1824 at Pitchcroft, Worcester Spring fought against the Irish fighter Jack Langan. The fight was for a purse of 300 sovereigns (about £25,000 in 2010), and drew a crowd of some 40,000 and lasted 77 rounds.

The two boxers had very different styles – Spring was light on his feet and fast, while Langan was slower and heavier. Spring was victorious against Langan on a second occasion.

In 1824 Spring decided to retire from boxing, his hands, never strong and always easily damaged, were now weakened. Throughout his career Spring had often managed to avoid damage with his fast hits and what became known as his Harlequin Step; this was a technique he developed of putting himself just within reach of his opponent, then avoiding the instinctive punch while simultaneously delivering one himself.

== Retirement ==
On his retirement he purchased the Castle Inn at Holborn (previously owned by the pugilist Bob Gregson), which under his management became the unofficial headquarters of English boxing; fights were arranged and contracts signed under his supervision. On 25 September 1828 an organization known as the Fair Play Club was formed to try and clean up boxing's image, "to ensure fair play to the combatants" and "to preserve peace and order in the outer ring"; this was in addition to the London Prize Ring rules, which had been devised by Jack Broughton almost a century earlier. Spring was elected as the club's first treasurer, and was also authorised to employ officials to enforce the new rules and prevent invasions of the ring by supporters.

Spring, however, was not immune from criticism himself. Vast amounts of money were bet on the outcome of fights and inside knowledge could make the holder enormous sums. Spring twice arranged fights for, and personally seconded, the Irish heavyweight champion Simon Byrne. In 1831 he put Byrne in the ring against the heavyweight champion Jem Ward, knowing that Byrne was unfit and out of condition; Ward was known to be corrupt, having once thrown a fight for £100. Spring finally pulled Byrne out of the fight in the 33rd round, allowing Ward to retire and retain his title. The boxing commentator Gilbert Odd described this fight as a "disgraceful affair".

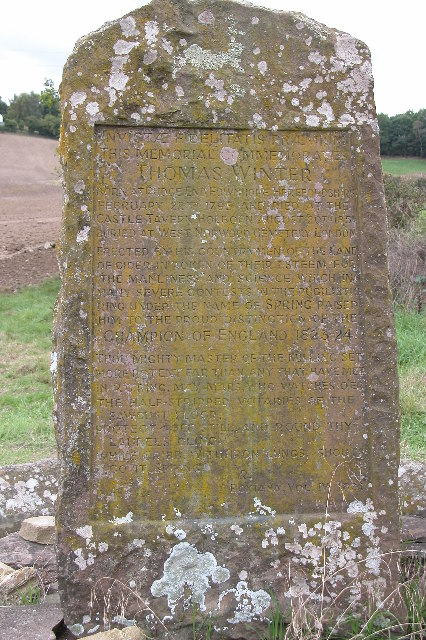
Memorial to Thomas Winter in Fownhope

On the second occasion he seconded for Byrne, in 1833, Byrne was fighting James Burke for the heavyweight title. This was the longest fight in boxing history until the famous bout between Andy Bowen and Jack Burke in 1893, which went 111 rounds. It was brutal and bloody, but vast sums were riding on the fight. In the 99th round Spring had to carry the barely conscious Byrne to the mark to fight. Byrne was quickly knocked unconscious and died three days later. The death finally led to a reform in the rules governing English boxing.

In retirement Spring became very wealthy. He is known to have married and had two children. He split from his wife, and, in spite of the wealth Spring later acquired, she died destitute in the Holborn workhouse. But Spring remained well respected for his kindness and good manners outside of the boxing ring. His reputation was in itself an achievement for a fight promoter of this era. After his death on 20 August 1851 his funeral was well attended, with many neighbours from The Castle, Holborn, walking with his coffin to West Norwood Cemetery. Spring was buried under his real name of Thomas Winter.

Sir Arthur Conan Doyle wrote a short story, "The Lord of Falconbridge", with Spring as the protagonist.

== See also ==
- List of bare-knuckle boxers
