= Boxing News =

UK magazine

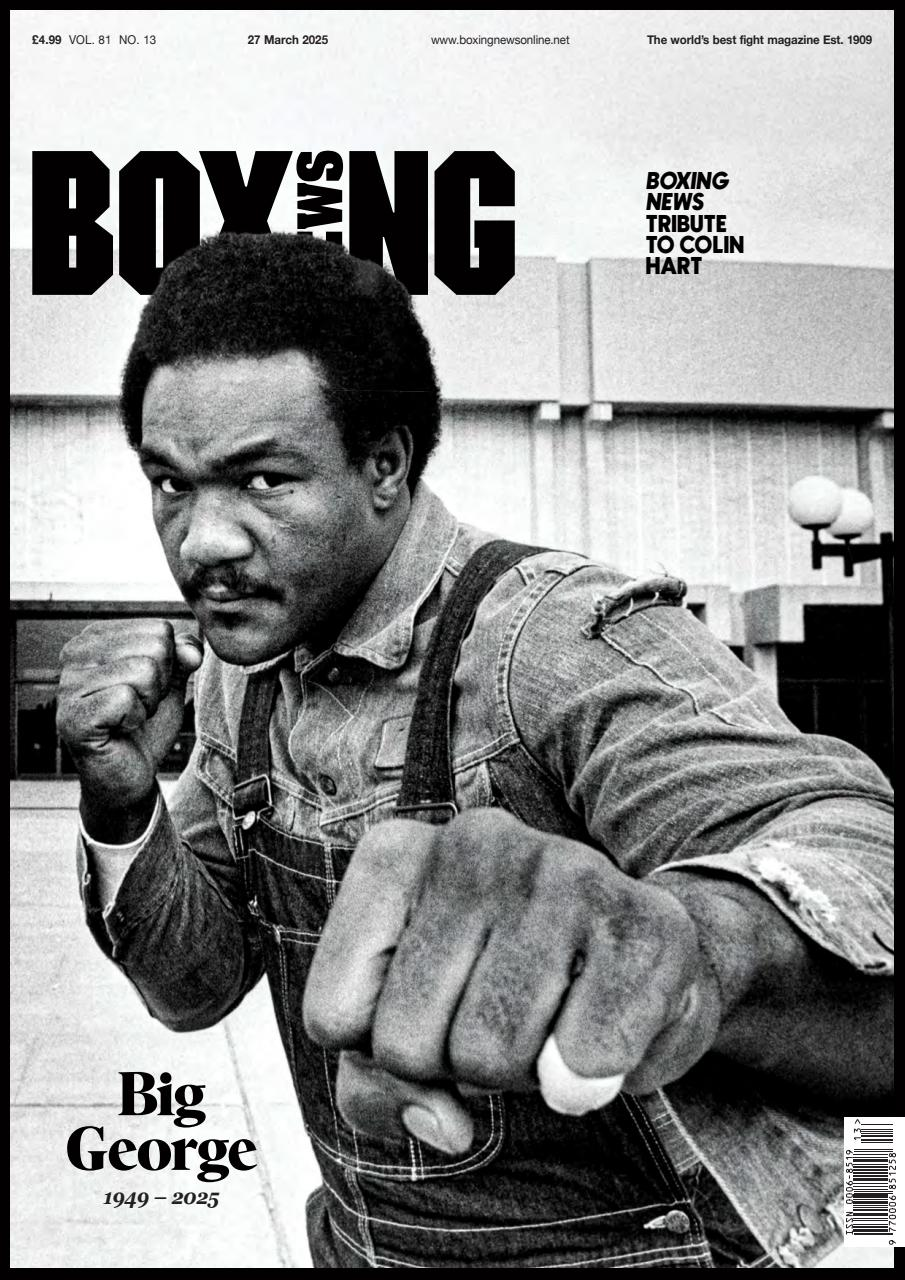
- Issue from March 27, 2025, after the death of George Foreman
- Editor: Oliver Fennell
- Frequency: Monthly (formerly weekly)
- Publisher: Boxing News Ltd
- First issue: 1909
- Country: United Kingdom
- Language: English
- Website: boxingnewsonline.net
- ISSN: 0006-8519

Boxing News is an independently published British boxing magazine. It is the oldest boxing magazine still in publication.

== History ==
John Murray, a regular contributor to Health & Strength magazine, convinced its owner, Bill Berry (later Lord Camrose) to launch a weekly magazine dedicated to boxing.

In 1909, Boxing News was founded by Murray as editor. It is believed that Murray had been inspired by Jack Johnson beating Tommy Burns to become the first black world heavyweight champion. In his first editorial, Murray stated, "Boxing will stand for good clean sport. Its success or failure is in the hands of those who believe in the characteristics of this sport. Our energies will be devoted to giving the best paper that time, thought, and money can devise."

When circulation began to decline in the late 1920s, the name of the newspaper was changed to Boxing, Racing and Football.

== Sale and ownership (1931–1971) ==
In October 1931, the magazine was sold to a syndicate of London sportsmen, who installed Sydney Rushton, a long-time London fight reporter, as the new editor. Rushton proved less popular than Murray and the newspaper was put up for sale again. Another set of sportsmen bought the magazine and Godfrey Williams was named editor. He attempted to run Boxing as a newspaper, cutting popular features, and reducing news stories down to the shortest possible length.

The circulation quickly dropped to its lowest ever. Billy Masters, a city printer and boxing fan, saved the paper, appointing W. H. Miller as the new editor. Miller was responsible for reinvigorating the magazine.

In 1935, Miller departed and was replaced by Sydney Ackland, who had previously worked as John Murray's assistant editor. World War II brought many changes as first Ackland, then replacement Stanley Nelson, contributed to the war effort. Murray then was reinstated as editor, but ill health forced him to step down in 1941. Gilbert Odd took over until the building housing the paper was renovated. Odd was then called up for national service and both Masters and Murray served further terms.

The paper was bought by Australian publicist Vivian Brodzky and former promoter Sydney Hulls. Northern sports writer Bert Callis was the new editor. Odd took over for a second term upon Callis' retirement. Odd implemented the tradition of reporting the results and fighters' weights for every single fight in the country. When Odd quit to write books, he was succeeded by Jack Wilson and then Tim Riley. When Brodzky died, Boxing News was sold twice in quick succession, and Graham Houston became editor in 1971, immediately broadening the range of coverage, especially in North America.

== The Mullan years (1977–1996) ==
In 1977, Harry Mullan, thought to be one of the better editors, replaced Houston. Circulation increased during the Mullan years, doubling at a time of great change in the boxing world. The most notable new developments were the proliferation of world titles and the increase in the number of major British promoters. Mullan was fiercely principled and well respected in the boxing fraternity. When he left in October 1996, he was given a glowing tribute from then-BN publisher Peter Kravitz: "His writing stands comparison with the Lieblings, Hausers and Mailers of this century of boxing."

Assistant editor Claude Abrams succeeded Mullan in November 1996. Boxing News was redesigned, switched to a full-colour format, and became more extensive in content.

== 1999–present ==
In March 1999 the paper went to A3 size before reverting to A4, and increasing in length to 48 pages (from 24) in September 2005. The magazine remained the main trade paper in Britain. Abrams left Boxing News – after 22 years – in December 2009, just three months after the publication celebrated its centenary, and was succeeded as editor by Tris Dixon.

Dixon left the magazine in December 2014, with Matt Christie taking over as editor.

In April 2023, A digital media group announced the acquisition of Boxing News. The acquisition saw the merger of the iD Boxing platform with the Boxing News brand, creating Boxing News Plus.

In February 2024, Boxing News' podcast, The Boxing Show, won Best Combat Sports Podcast at the Sports Podcast Awards.

In March 2024, Boxing News announced the launch of the Boxing News app, which merges a prediction league with live scorecard functionality.

In April 2024, Mark Butcher was announced as editor of Boxing News after the departure of Matt Christie.

Boxing News ceased to be a weekly publication at the end of 2025, after a 116-year run as such. The final weekly edition was published on December 18, 2025, and then the title relaunched as a monthly magazine in January 2026, having merged with and revived the defunct Boxing Monthly magazine. Oliver Fennell was appointed editor.

== Sections of the paper ==
- Editor's Letter: A column tackling the big issues in boxing at the time
- Guest Column: This rotates but features key figures from the sport of boxing including, Tyson Fury, Amir Khan and Joe Gallagher.
- News: All the latest breaking stories and the background behind them. Boxing News has spoken exclusively to, among others, Canelo Álvarez, Frank Warren, Anthony Joshua, and Gervonta Davis.
- Action: British fights and major foreign contests are covered, blow-by-blow. As the motto goes, 'Every punch, every week, since 1909'.
- Previews: A preview of the fights and predictions. When a major fight occurs, it has been known for BN to also produce a 12-page supplement befitting the occasion. This was done for Manny Pacquiao v Floyd Mayweather and Carl Froch v George Groves.
- Features: An in-depth look at key figures and events in boxing. Features have focused on Mexican sensation Saul Alvarez, multi-weight world champion Miguel Cotto and Wladimir Klitschko.
- Q&A: A chat with one of boxing's current or former stars
- Fight Schedule: Every upcoming fight listed
- Rankings: BN updates both its highly regarded World and British rankings for each weight division on a monthly basis.
- Readers' letters: Letters from readers of the magazine.
- Amateur Scene: The very best action, previews and news from the unpaid ranks
- 60 Seconds: Boxers answer quickfire questions in a 60-second interview.
