= 1799 in sports =

1799 in sports describes the year's events in world sport.

== Boxing ==
Events

- Jack Bartholomew retained his English Championship title but no fights involving him are recorded in 1799.

== Cricket ==
Events

- An indication of how cricket was spreading throughout India can be observed in the formation of a cricket club at Seringapatam immediately following the successful British siege which ended the rule of Tipu Sultan
- The number of matches played in England continued to decline due to the impact of the Napoleonic Wars.

England

- Most runs – Tom Walker 239
- Most wickets – Thomas Lord 16

== Horse racing ==
England

- The Derby – Archduke
- The Oaks – Bellina
- St Leger Stakes – Cockfighter
