= Ned Painter =

English bare-knuckle prize fighter

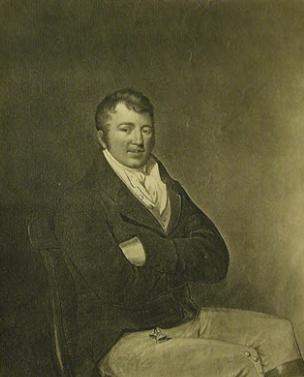
- Painter, c. 1810
- Born: Edward Painter; Stretford, England
- Baptised: 15 February 1784
- Died: 18 September 1852 (aged 68); Norwich, England
- Occupation: Boxer

Edward Painter (1784 – 18 September 1852), better known as Ned Painter, was an English bare-knuckle prize fighter. He was born in Stretford, then in Lancashire, and was possibly the son of John and Mary Painter baptised at Stretford Old Chapel, (now St. Matthews) Stretford on 15 February 1784.

== Boxing career ==
Painter is known to have served time in King's Bench Prison. His first fight was against the Irish boxer J. Coyne, who stood 6 ft (1.8 m) tall and weighed 14 stone (200 lb; 89 kg); Painter was a stone lighter and 5 ft 9 3/4 in (1.77 m). The contest took place at St Nicholas near Margate on 23 August 1813, and after 40 minutes Painter emerged victorious. On 17 May 1814, Painter fought Tom Oliver the Gardener at Shepperton Range, a brutal bout that Painter lost, both men incurring serious injuries. Historian Pierce Egan described the bout as "enough to finish any two men", and by the time of his defeat in the 8th round, stated that Painter was "quite blind, and his nose beat flat upon his face", while Oliver's body was "terribly beaten, his head much disfigured, and nearly one of his eyes closed".

Painter fought Corporal John Shaw on 18 April 1815 in front of a large crowd at Hounslow Heath. He lost the fight, Shaw being at least 6 ft (1.8 m) and around 15 stone (210 lb; 95 kg) with a strength and reach advantage.

Painter twice fought Tom Spring in 1818. During the first match, held on Mickleham Downs on 1 April 1818, he was struck by Spring in the side of the throat, his head and shoulder striking a stake supporting the ring on the way down. He fought on until the 31st round despite his injury but lost the fight. Painter's defeat came as a major upset to the sporting community, and a lot of people lost money betting on the fight. Egan documented: "Painter, from his hard hitting and bottom (Note: "Bottom" is a 19th-century term for physical endurance.) qualities, stood so high in the estimation of the amateurs, that it was booked Spring would prove an easy conquest to him." A rematch took place on 7 August 1818; many of Painter's devoted fans had shifted their allegiance to Spring and he was now the favourite to win. Painter slugged it out for 42 rounds, giving Spring a powerful right above his right eye, before defeating him. According to Frank L. Dowling, Painter "had not been a successful boxer, but the men he had fought were known to be first-raters, and he displayed such gluttony and stamina."

== Later life and death ==
Painter announced his retirement from boxing after his victory over Spring, and became the landlord of The Anchor in Lobster Lane, Norwich, where he lived for many years. He was persuaded out of retirement for a final contest against Tom Oliver on 17 July 1820, which Painter won. He died at his son's home in Lakenham, Norwich, on 18 September 1852, and was buried at St Peters in Lakenham four days later.
