= Alexander McKay (boxer) =

Scottish boxer

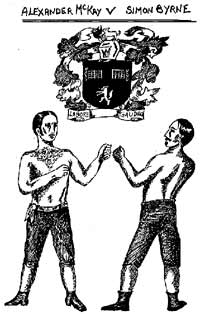
One of the few known images of Alexander McKay, a poster advertising the match between him and Simon Byrne (right)

Alexander McKay (c. 1804 – 3 June 1830) was a Scottish heavyweight bare-knuckle fighter. He fought in just five prize fights, these are:

1. Loss to Simon Byrne after 47 mins, in 5 rounds on 3 May 1827
2. Win over Peter Curran after 18 mins – in 1828
3. Win over Paul Spencer after 25 rounds on 16 October 1828 £40
4. Win over Paul Spencer after 30 mins in 34 rounds on 17 February 1829
5. Loss to Simon Byrne after 53 mins in 47 rounds on 2 June 1830

McKay died of a brain haemorrhage 30 hours after his second fight against Byrne. The news of his death was greeted in his native Scotland by rioting in which several died. He is buried in churchyard in the village of Hanslope, Buckinghamshire. The following epitaph is engraved on his tombstone.

"Strong and athletic was my frame
Far from my native home I came
And bravely fought with Simon Byrne
Alas, but never to return.
Stranger take warning from my fate
Lest you should rue your case too late
If you have ever fought before
Determine now to fight no more"

== See also ==
- List of bare-knuckle boxers
