= Emil Novruzov =

Azerbaijani-Russian boxer

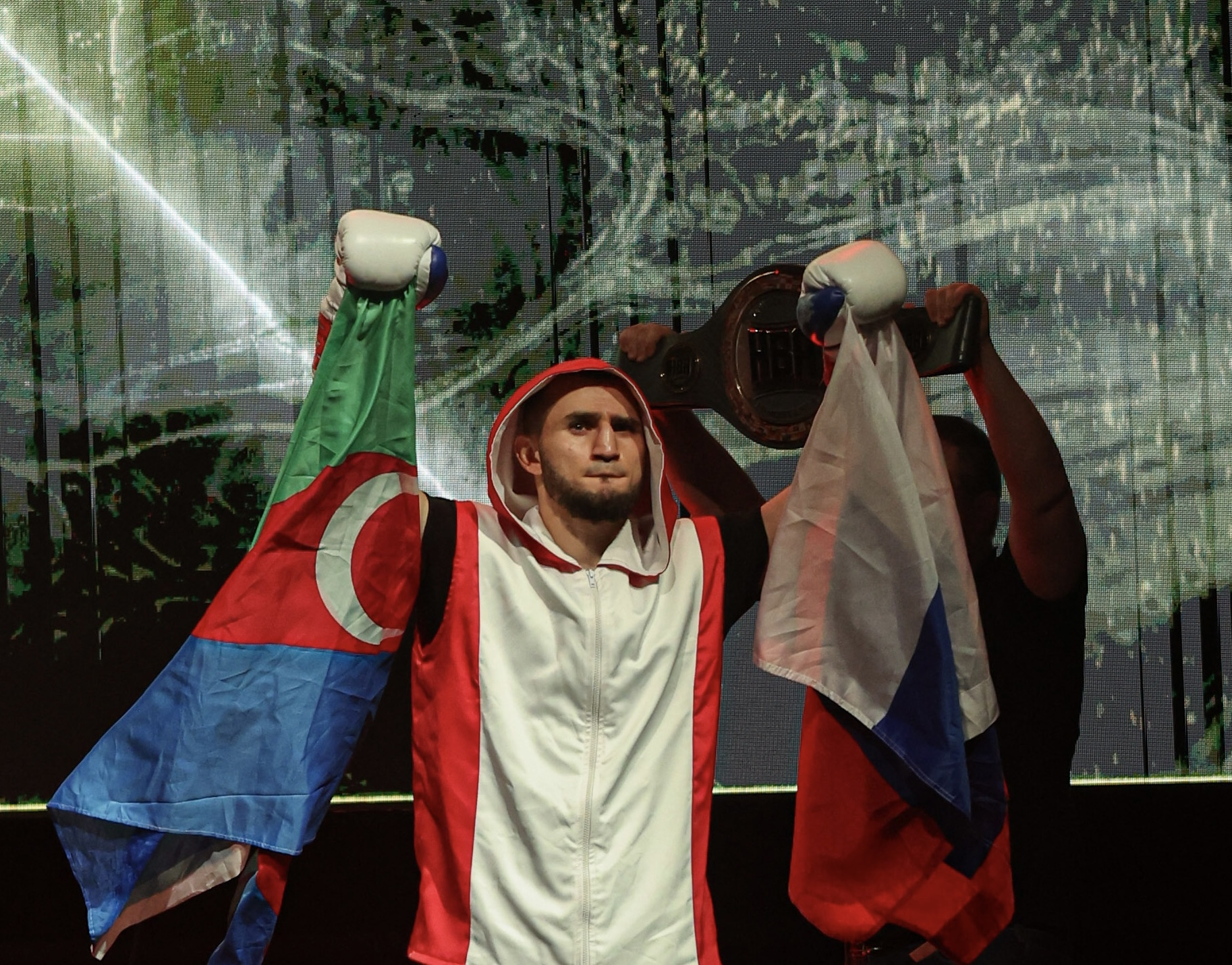

Personal information
- Nickname: Gladiator
- Nationality: (Azerbaijan) Azerbaijani (Russia) Russian
- Born: Emil Novruzov; 8 December 1995 (age 30)
- Height: 177 cm (5 ft 9 1/2 in)
- Weight: Welterweight; Light Welterweight; Lightweight

Boxing career

Emil Novruzov (Russian: Эми́ль Новру́зов; born December 8, 1995, in Baku, Azerbaijan) is an Azerbaijani-Russian boxer competing in the welterweight division of Hardcore Boxing. He is the current Hardcore Boxing Association (HBA) World Champion (2022—present), inaugural Hardcore FC 77 kg Grand Prix finalist, and former Hype Fighting Grand Prix finalist. He has also competed in bare-knuckle boxing for Hardcore FC.

== Biography ==
After graduating from high school, he moved to Moscow to pursue higher education. As a result, he entered Moscow University, majoring in “Financial Management". Because of this, he received the nickname “Financier” on “HardcoreFC". His father was a master of sports in the USSR in freestyle wrestling, so since childhood Emil was a very active child. He was involved in sports such as basketball, fencing and karate. Nevertheless, at the age of 12, Emil, at the request of his father, began to seriously engage in boxing. Being already a student of Moscow University, the fighter often performed at tournaments and fulfilled the Master of Sports standard several times

== Championships and accomplishments ==
- Hardcore Boxing
  - HBA Super Welterweight Champion (One time, current)

== Professional boxing record ==
3 fights	3 wins	0 losses
By knockout	1	0
By decision	2	0

No.	Result	Record	Opponent	Type	Round, time	Date	Location	Notes
3	Win	3–0	(Ghana) Richard Fenyi	UD	6	26 August 2023	Moscow, Russia	
2	Win	2–0	(Venezuela) Yeison Gonzalez	TKO	2 (6), 1:10	18 March 2023	Agenda Arena, Dubai, United Arab Emirates	Retains the HBA super welterweight championship.
1	Win	1–0	(Armenia) Martin Dzhuaryan	DEC	6	7 October 2021	Vegas City Hall, Moscow, Russia	Won the HBA super welterweight championship.

== Bare knuckle boxing record ==
Professional record breakdown
6 matches	5 wins	1 loss
By knockout	1	0
By decision	4	1

Res.	Record	Opponent	Method	Event	Date	Round	Time	Location	Notes
Loss	5–1	Mukhamed Kalmikov	Decision	Hardcore FC 15	February 10, 2021	3	2:00	Moscow, Russia	
Win	5–0	Timur Nikulin	Decision (unanimous)	Hardcore FC 12	December 23, 2020	3	2:00	Moscow, Russia	
Win	4–0	Vitaly Bodrov	Decision (unanimous)	Hardcore FC 10	November 26, 2020	3	2:00	Moscow, Russia	
Win	3–0	Aleksan Stamboltsyan	Decision (unanimous)	Hardcore FC 6	October 1, 2020	3	2:00	Moscow, Russia	
Win	2–0	Faizali Makhmurodov	Decision (unanimous)	Hardcore FC 4	September 3, 2020	3	2:00	Moscow, Russia	
Win	1–0	Amirkhan Oev	TKO (doctor stoppage)	Hardcore FC 2	July 24, 2020	1	N/A	Moscow, Russia	

== Modified rules record ==
Res.	Record	Opponent	Method	Event	Date	Round	Time	Location	Notes
Win	5–1	(Brazil) Eduardo Castro	TKO (injury)	Nomad Fighting Championship: Novruzov vs. Castro	14 March 2023	1	2:40	Almaty, Kazakhstan	Boxing with MMA gloves.
Win	4–1	(Kazakhstan) Askhat Akimov	Decision (unanimous)	Nomad Fighting Championship: Novruzov vs. Akimov	18 May 2022	3	3:00	Almaty, Kazakhstan	Boxing with MMA gloves.
Loss	3–1	(Russia) Kharon Boziev	Decision (unanimous)	Hype FC 5: Novruzov vs. Boziev	21 December 2021	3	3:00	Moscow, Russia	Cage boxing.
Win	3–0	(Kazakhstan) Muratbek Kasymbay	Decision	Hype FC 4: Kasymbay vs. Novruzov	4 October 2021	3	3:00	Moscow, Russia	Cage boxing.
Win	2–0	(Russia) Akhmad Edelbiev	DQ	Hype FC 3: Ziyaev vs. Isaev	15 September 2021	2		Moscow, Russia	Cage boxing.
Win	1–0	(Tajikistan) Chorshanbe Chorshanbiev	Decision	Hype FC 2: Chorshanbiev vs. Novruzov	8 July 2021	3	3:00	Moscow, Russia	Cage boxing.
