= Nicholas Ward (boxer) =

British bare-knuckle boxer

Nicholas Ward (1 April 1811 – 17 February 1850) was an English bare-knuckle fighter. Nick Ward was the heavyweight champion of England for four months in 1841. His first recorded fight was in 1835 against Harry John Lockyer. In 1840 he fought his brother Jem Ward's old enemy James Burke; Burke was a feared and dangerous fighter, who had killed one opponent, the champion Simon Byrne. Following the match Jem Ward had refused to fight Burke, would not hand over the championship belt or acknowledge Burke as the heavyweight champion, even after he was acquitted of murder. Nick Ward won the bout against Burke when his gang of supporters forced the referee to disqualify Burke for an alleged foul. This winning pattern was repeated when in February 1841 Ward became heavyweight champion. He beat Ben Caunt, the reigning champion, when Caunt was disqualified, after the referee succumbed to pressure from the crowd claiming Caunt hit Ward while he was down. In May of the same year Caunt legitimately beat Ward and regained his title. At this time boxing was governed by the less than arduous London Prize Ring rules. The more strict and fair Queensbury rules were not implemented until much later in the century.

Nick Ward is today considered a "mediocre" boxer, known for using "unfair tactics" and avoiding head on fighting. However, in spite of his reputation for underhand fighting he was considered a good counter puncher.

Ward died in Soho, London in 1850 aged 38.

== See also ==
- List of bare-knuckle boxers
