= James Burke (boxer) =

English boxer

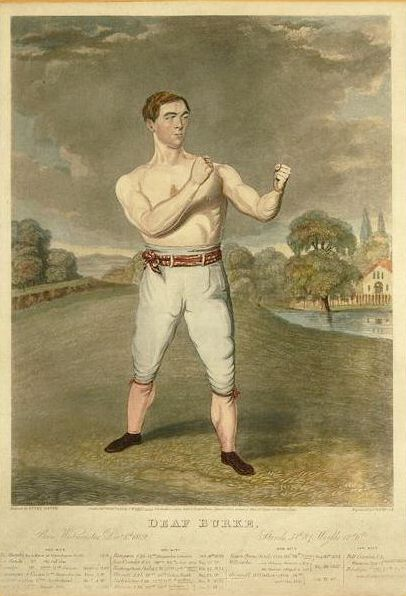
Hand-coloured aquatint by Charles Hunt, c. 1839 (after a painting by Henry Hoppner Meyer)

James "Deaf" Burke (8 December 1809 – 8 January 1845) was an English bare-knuckle boxer active from 1828 to 1843. He primarily competed in Southern England, though he also toured the United States from 1836 to 1838, fighting both exhibition matches and prizefights.

== Early life and boxing career ==
James Burke was born on 8 December 1809 in St Giles, London. He was deaf from infancy and worked as a waterman on the River Thames before he began boxing professionally in 1828. He stood 5 feet 8 inches (173 cm) tall and weighed between 12 stone 4 pounds (172 lb; 78 kg) and 13 stone (180 lb; 83 kg) during his career. He was known by the nicknames "Deaf Burke" and "the Deaf'un".

His first major fight was against Bill Fitzmaurice at Harpenden on 9 June 1829. Burke won the bout, which went for 166 rounds, lasting three hours. He fought ten additional opponents in various bouts between 1829 and 1833, including an 8 January 1833 fight which he won against Harry Macone, who stood 6 feet 2 inches (188 cm) tall and weighed 15 stone (210 lb; 95 kg).

== Burke versus Byrne ==
In 1833, Burke challenged Simon Byrne, and they fought on 30 May 1833 at Nomansland Common, Hertfordshire. According to Bell's Life in London, each man staked £100 but an 1833 broadside published in Edinburgh claimed that each side staked £150. Burke was backed by boxers Tom Gaynor and Dick Curtis and trained with Thomas Owen at Northfleet. Byrne was backed by boxers Jem Ward, Tom Spring, and Ned Neale, training with the latter. Burke was favoured to win by 5–4 odds.

Bell's Life in London claims that the fight went for ninety-nine rounds, lasting three hours and six minutes, but the Edinburgh broadside claims it lasted twenty-seven rounds, totalling seventy-five minutes. Both fighters drew blood during the first round. Burke was knocked down in the twenty-seventh round and vomited blood in the thirtieth round. Burke rallied in the forty-ninth round, and by the ninety-third round Byrne exhibited signs of exhaustion. Witnesses later recounted that both fighters had been carried to scratch at the start of some rounds, and that by the fight's final rounds, neither man would have been able to get up from his own corner without being carried by his seconds, a practice later banned by the 1838 London Prize Ring Rules. In the ninety-ninth round, Byrne fell unconscious and could no longer stand. Burke was declared the victor, and Gaynor proclaimed that Burke was the "Champion of England".

Byrne was carried to St Albans, where a surgeon attended to his wounds. His conditioned worsened the day after the fight. Leeches were applied to the bruised parts of his head and body. As his condition worsened, he was inspected by surgeon Astley Cooper, who determined that Byrne would not recover. Byrne died from injuries three days after the fight. Burke was charged with first-degree manslaughter, and Ward, Spring, Curtis, Gaynor, the umpires, and the referees were charged with second-degree manslaughter. Burke and Curtis were tried at the Hertford Assizes on 11 July 1833 but were acquitted and freed because the surgeon who had attended to Byrne was unable to determine if Byrne died from blows to the head or from the force of his exertions.

== Tour of the United States ==
Burke struggled to find opponents in Britain after Byrne's death. In 1833, he received a challenge from Irish boxer Sam O'Rourke to fight at the Curragh of County Kildare, but Burke refused to go to Ireland. He tried to arrange a fight with Young Dutch Sam for a £500 stake on each side, but Burke was unable to raise sufficient funds. He then tried to arrange a fight with Jem Ward for a £100 stake on each side, but Ward declined to fight for less than £200 per side.

Burke went to the United States in 1836. He fought against American boxers, including Jim Phelan and Abraham Vanderzee. Sam O'Rourke had gone to America in 1834, and he and Burke staged sparring exhibitions across the country. On 6 May 1837, Burke and O'Rourke fought a prizefight in New Orleans. O'Rourke was favoured by the local Irish population, and a riot broke out among some of the Irish spectators during the third round. Burke fled on horseback, pursued by an armed mob. Violence continued among the spectators until the mayor raised the militia to quell the violence.

Burke travelled to New York and appeared in local clubs and theatres. On 21 August 1837, he won a prizefight against Tom O'Connell at Hart Island. Three hundred spectators attended, paying $5 each for steamboat transport to the island. O'Connell was seconded by Abraham Vanderzee and Alexander Hamilton; Burke, by Jake Somerendyke and Bill Hatfield. Burke dominated from the first round and was declared the victor after the tenth round.

== Return to Britain ==
Burke returned to Britain in 1838 and on 29 July issued a challenge to fight any man for the championship of England and a stake of either £100 or £500 a side. He also demanded that Jem Ward, who had retired, add his champions belt to the pot. William "Bendigo" Thompson accepted the challenge, and on 12 February 1839, the men arranged a fight regulated by the new London Prize Ring Rules for a total sum of £220 at Heather, Leicestershire. As many as 15,000 spectators attended. Burke was seconded by Jem Burn, King Dick, and Tommy Roundhead; Thompson, by Jim Ward, Nick Ward, and Peter Taylor. Thompson drew first blood in the third round, causing Burke's nose to bleed. Burke was disqualified in the tenth round for headbutting Thompson twice, in violation of the new prize ring rules. Jem Ward presented Thompson with a champions belt. Burke initially spoke of rematch, but Thompson suffered a leg injury in March 1840, and did not box for several years.

Burke fought Nick Ward at Lillingstone Lovell, Oxfordshire, for a £100 prize on 22 September 1840. Ward drew blood in the first round, causing Burke's cheek to bleed, but Burke also cut Ward's lip later in the round. Ward fought cautiously, slowly, and defensively for the first four rounds. In the 17th round, Ward had Burke on the ropes and knocked him down. Burke's seconds cried foul, and while the referee was making a decision and Burke was in his corner, Ward repeatedly struck Burke in face. Referee decided in Ward's favour, and Ward won the fight, though Burke protested the outcome.

== Later life and death ==
Burke retired from prize fighting after his defeat by Ward, and made a living teaching self-defence lessons. He came out of retirement to fight Bob Castles for a £50 prize on 13 June 1843. Burke won the bout after thirty-seven rounds, though he was infected with tuberculosis at the time.

Burke died of tuberculosis on 8 January 1845 at his home in Frances Street, Waterloo, London. He is buried in St John's Church-yard, Waterloo. He was inducted to the International Boxing Hall Of Fame in 1992.
