= William Daniels (painter) =

British painter

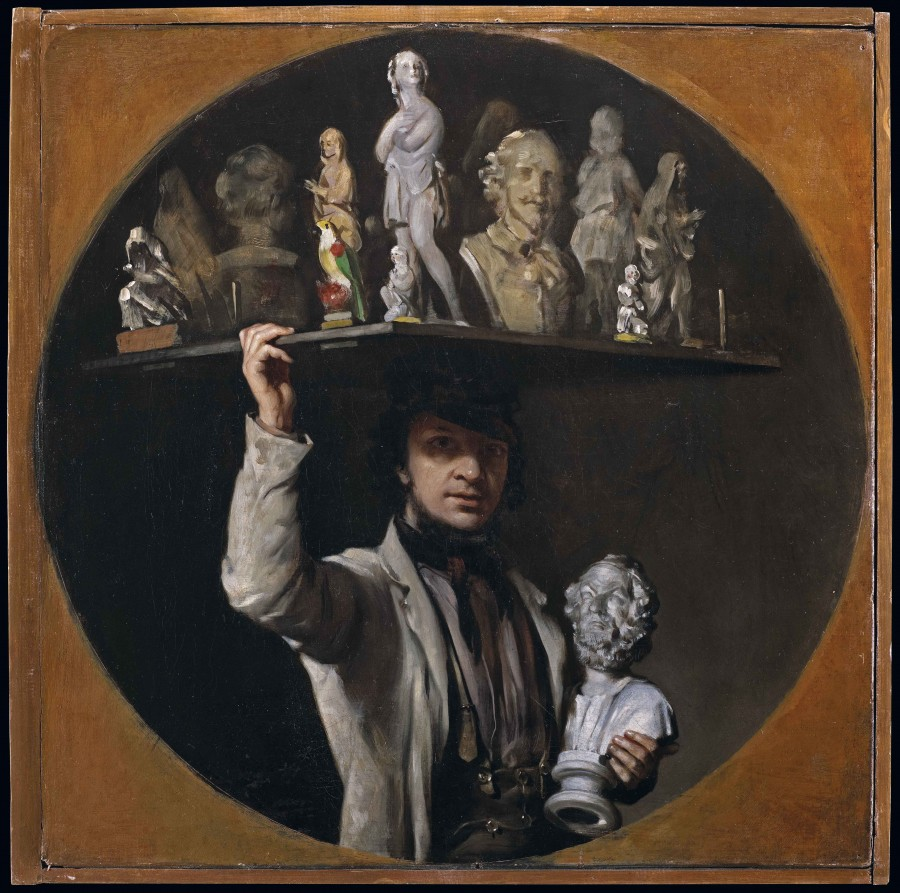
- Self-Portrait, As Pedlar of Statues, c.1850
- Born: 9 May 1813; Liverpool, England
- Died: 13 October 1880 (aged 67); Everton, Liverpool
- Education: Self taught
- Spouse: Mary Owen
- Patrons: Joshua Walmsley

William Daniels (9 May 1813 – 13 October 1880), was a British painter known for his work in Liverpool.

== Early life ==
Daniels was born in the Scotland Road district of Liverpool. His father was a former soldier turned brick maker and his mother was a barmaid. Daniels worked with his family in the brickfields from a young age. While working there, his talent for making modelled red clay was noticed by local artist and wood-engraver Alexander Mosses, who taught him drawing and wood engraving. He then served as an apprentice wood-engraver for seven years and received instruction in drawing at the Royal Liverpool Institution.

== Career ==
Daniels was entirely self-taught as a painter – mostly teaching himself at home by candle-light. He often used himself and family members as models, also painting local characters in his work.

The first public exhibition of his work was at the Liverpool Academy of Arts, when he was 17. Seven of Daniels's paintings were exhibited at the Royal Academy, London in 1840 and 1846. He was unsuccessful at establishing a career in London, but built a reputation as a portrait painter in Liverpool. Sir Joshua Walmsley became a patron of Daniels and commissioned three portraits of the Walmsley family. Other patrons from Liverpool's elite circles included Sir Humphry Davy and George Stephenson. Walmsley bequeathed five portraits to the Victoria & Albert Museum in London. Daniels was commissioned to travel to London to complete a portrait of the Duke of Wellington, but was dismissed from the job when he was late for a sitting.

== Works ==
His paintings are in the collections of the Walker Art Gallery, Liverpool, the Victoria & Albert Museum, London, the University of Wales, Bangor, and the Williamson Art Gallery, Wirral. He is considered one of the 'Liverpool school' of painters, Liverpool-born artists who flourished in first half of the 19th century, which includes William Huggins, Alexander Mosses, Robert Saloman, Charles Towne, Samuel Walters, W. L. Windus.

== Personal life ==
Art historian H.C. Marillier said he had a "taste of low life and convivial associations", an anonymous obituarist described him as having a "fascination with strong drink" and being a "slave to liquor". Many of his paintings ended up in the hands of local publicans and brewers. He enjoyed sparring with local professional boxers like Jem Ward, Tom Sayers and Jem Wharton. The clown and pub landlord Harry Boleno was also a friend. An obituary described him as delighting "in the society of pedlars, tramps, actors and boxers" and being "active with the gloves".

He married Mary Owens in 1839. He purchased the wedding ring using the proceeds from the sale of one of his paintings.

He was described as being "handsome and peculiarly dark" with a "bold, swarthy appearance" and was rumoured to have Romani and Welsh ancestry.

== Death ==
He died in Everton, Liverpool on 13 October 1880. He was buried at St James's Cemetery on 18 October 1880.

== Gallery ==
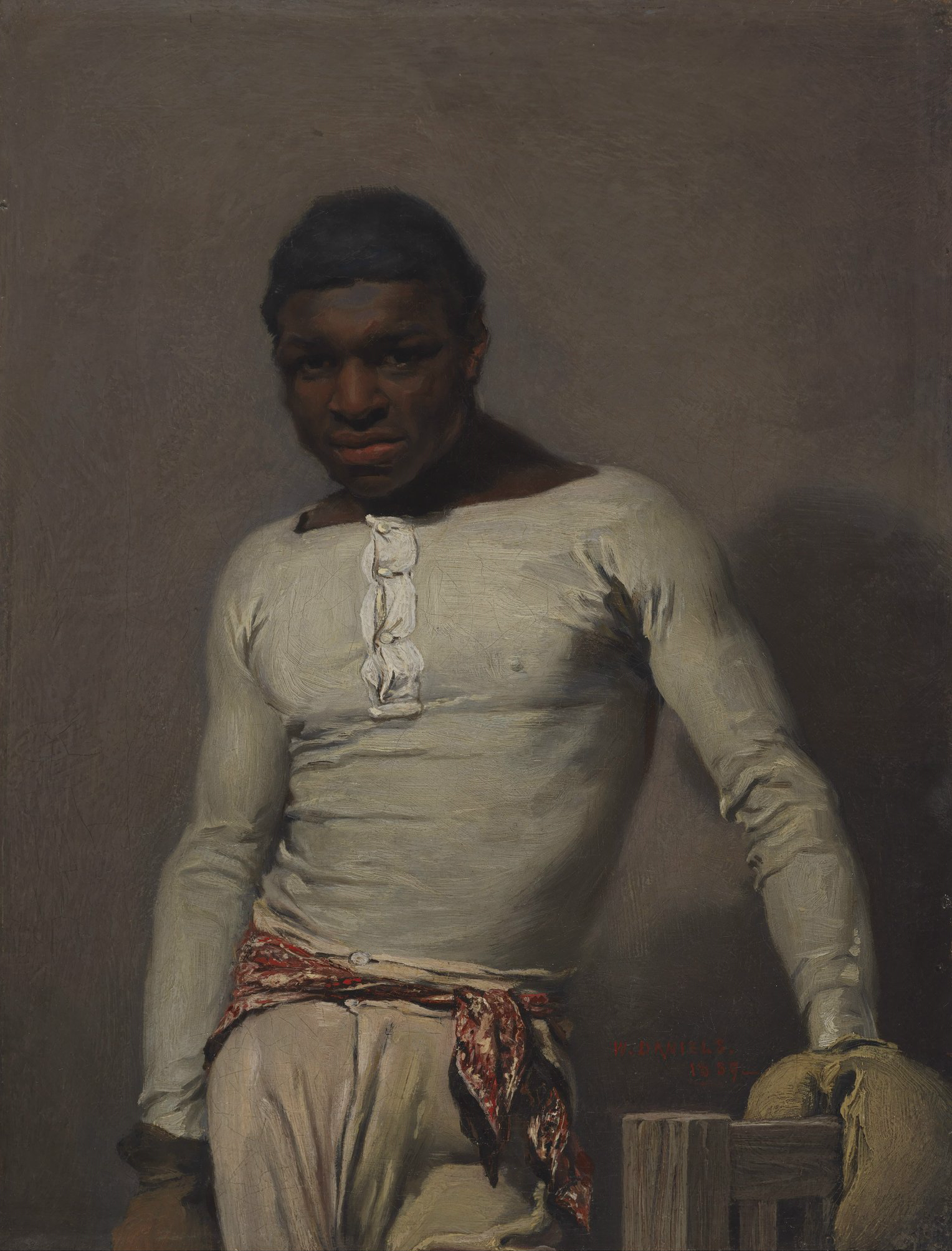
Portrait of Jem Wharton, 1839

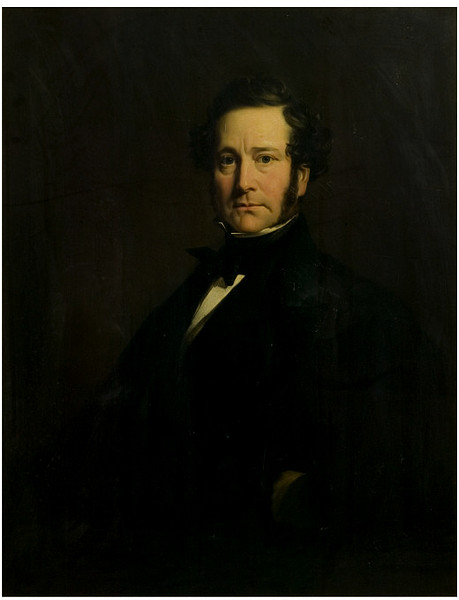
Portrait of Sir Joshua Walmsley, c.1843

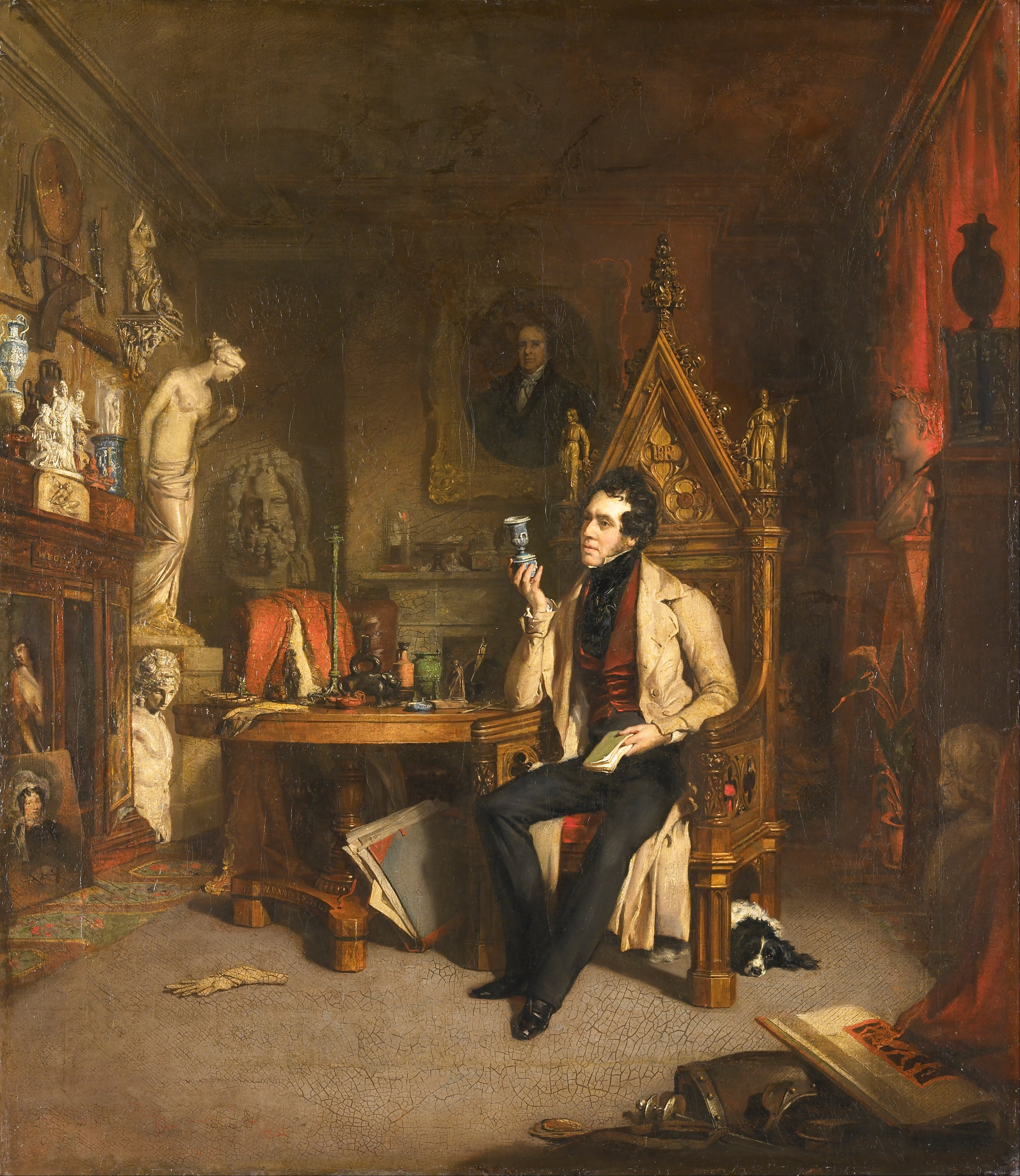
Portrait of Joseph Mayer, c.1843

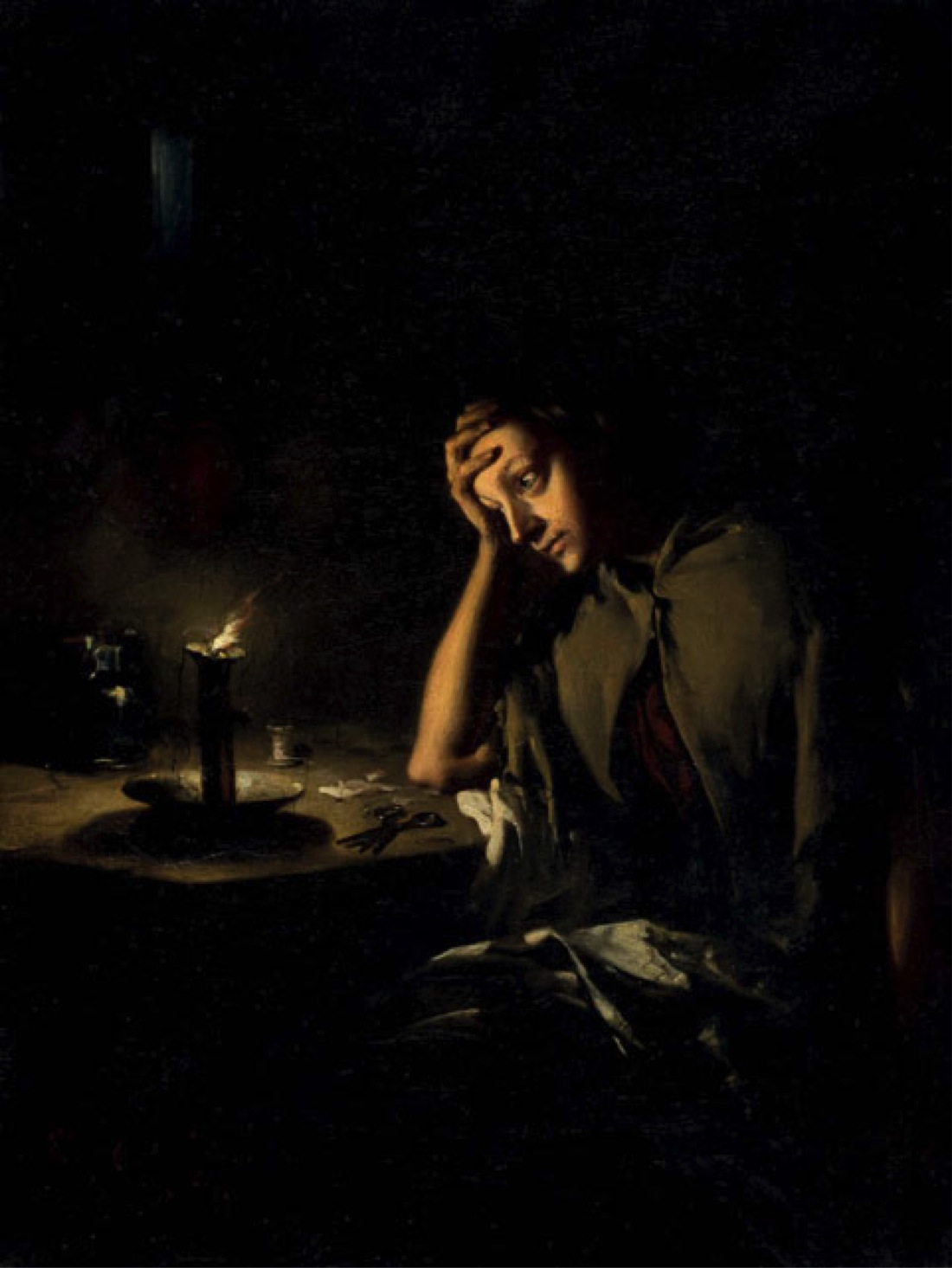
The Song of the Shirt, 1875
