= Peter Crawley (boxer) =

English boxer

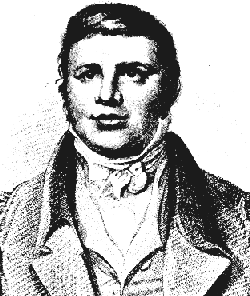

Personal information
- Nickname: Young Rump Steak
- Nationality: British
- Born: 5 December 1799 Newington Green, Middlesex, England
- Died: 12 March 1865 (aged 65) West Smithfield, London, England
- Height: 6 ft 0.5 in (1.84 m)
- Weight: 164.5 lb (74.6 kg)

Boxing career

Peter Crawley (born 5 December 1799, Newington Green, London – 12 March 1865, West Smithfield, London) was an English bare-knuckle boxer. He won the Championship of England in 1827.

== Fights ==
=== 1815 ===
- Pat Flannagan – WIN

=== 1816–1817 ===
- Bill Hunt – WIN
- Jack Bennett – WIN
- Tom Price – WIN
- Bill Coleman – WIN
- "Clara Market John" – WIN
- Harry Buckstone – WIN
- Tom McCarthy – WIN
- Tom Tyler – WIN
- Shirley's Carman – WIN
- Big Drayman – WIN

=== 1818 ===
- 11 February – Tom Watson – DRAW
- 7 August – Ben Sutcliffe – WIN

=== 1819 ===
- 16 March – Tom Hickman – LOSE

=== 1822 ===
- 7 May – "Southern's Bully" – WIN

=== 1823 ===
- 5 May – Dick Acton – WIN
- Crawley defeated some more minor opponents

=== 1825 ===
- Crawley was unsuccessful to find a backed to fight with Jem Ward for the championship of England

=== 1826 ===
- "Unknown Englander" – WIN (private fight)

=== 1827 ===
- 2 January – Jem Ward – WIN – Crawley becomes Champion of England
- 4 January – Crawley retires from the ring and refused to meet Jem Ward in another Championship fight
