= Harry Mullan =

Irish boxing writer and journalist

Harry Mullan was an Irish boxing writer and journalist. He died on 21 May 1999 at the age of 53 after suffering from cancer for four years. Born Patrick Henry Pearse Mullan in Coleraine, Ireland, on 22 April 1946, Mullan was brought up in Portstewart and later educated at St Patrick's College, Armagh and University College Dublin. He edited the British trade paper, Boxing News for 19 years, from 1977 until 1996. Only Gilbert Odd, Mullan's mentor, had a longer tenure. Mullan was an authoritative and principled writer, never afraid to highlight perceived injustice, and conveyed an innate understanding of the sport's political structure.

He wrote many books on boxing and was held in high regard in the United States, where he covered many bouts and was posthumously inducted into the International Boxing Hall of Fame in 2005. Mullan also contributed regularly to television and radio coverage of the sport. In the 1990s, Mullan worked as the boxing correspondent for the Sunday Times and later for the Independent on Sunday.

In accordance with his dying wishes he is buried in England near his wife, children and grandchildren

== Bibliography ==
In addition to a vast output for daily and weekly newspapers, and editorship (1977–87) of Boxing News Annual and (1988–92) News of the World Boxing Annual, Mullan's books include:

- The Illustrated History of Boxing (Hamlyn, 1987)
- The Book of Boxing Quotations (Stanley Paul, 1988)
- Heroes and Hard Men (Stanley Paul, 1989)
- (with Barry McGuigan and Gerry Callan) Barry McGuigan: The Untold Story (Robson, 1991) - a biography suppressed by a libel action
- Boxing: The Last 25 Years (W.H. Smith, 1991)
- (with Peter Arnold) A Boxing Companion (W.H. Smith, 1992)
- Fighting Words (Canterbury: Colebridge Associates, 1993) ISBN 0-9522714-0-0
- The Ultimate Encyclopedia of Boxing (London: Carlton, 1996), subsequently updated in various editions by Bob Mee, 2007 ed. ISBN 978-1-84442-401-6, 2010 ed. ISBN 978-1-84732-618-8
- Ring Wars: Pictorial History of Boxing (Paragon, 1997)
- Boxing: Inside the Game (Cambridge: Icon Books, 1998) ISBN 1-84046-029-6
- Boxing: The Complete Illustrated Guide
- The World Encyclopedia of Boxing
