= Nomansland Common =

Open space in Hertfordshire, England

Coordinates: 51°47.85768′N 0°18.21498′W

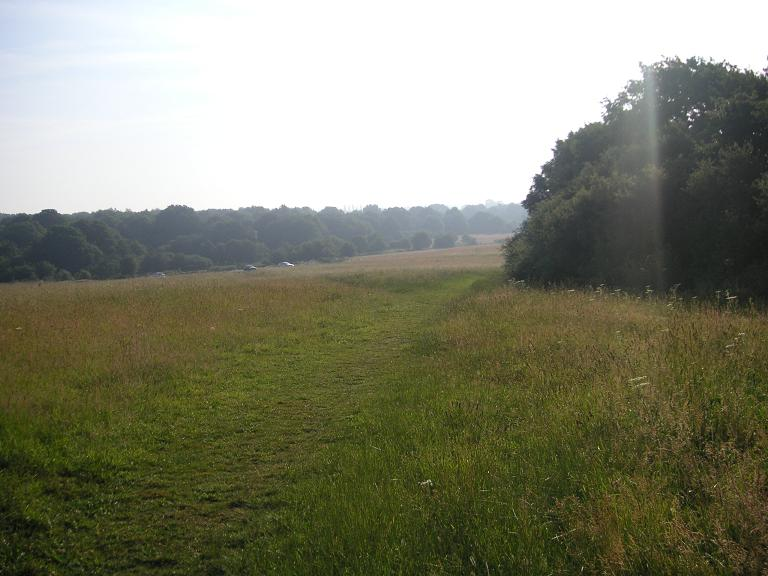
Nomansland common

Nomansland Common (sometimes simply called No Man's Land) is an area of common land in Hertfordshire, England to the south of Harpenden and the south-west of Wheathampstead.

Geologically, the common is part of the Harpenden Dry Valley. In the last ice age a glacier dammed the river (which then flowed from Dunstable) south of Sandridge into St Albans Vale, creating a lake. When the dam melted and water drained away, it left the thin, stony soil still found on the common today. Nomansland has, throughout its history, been recognised for uniquely poor soil quality for agricultural purposes, although flint axe heads suggest that the common may have been cleared for grazing as long ago as 4000 BC. In World War II attempts were made to plant crops on the common, but the common yielded less than half of the produce per unit area as other arable land, despite heavy use of fertilisers. After the end of the war, the land was re-seeded as grass and returned to recreational use.

== History ==
Nomansland Common, as its name implies, is extra-parochial, and was the source of frequent disputes between the monastery of St Albans and that of Westminster, both claiming it to be within their respective dioceses, and the manors of Sandridge and Wheathampstead. It is now divided between the parishes of Wheathampstead and Sandridge. In 1427 the abbot of Westminster erected a gallows there, which the servants of St Albans Abbey promptly destroyed. In 1428 a shepherd died on the common and the Vicar of Sandridge claimed the body for burial, but the men of Wheathampstead spirited the corpse away and buried it in their churchyard. In 1429 a jury agreed that both abbeys should share grazing rights and beat the boundaries according to their own claims.

In 1460 the Second Battle of St Albans was fought on Bernards Heath, and part of the conflict (the flight of the Yorkists) occurred on the common. In the 18th century, cannonballs and 25 skeletons were recovered from the site, and are believed to date from the battle.

In the 17th century brigands and footpads preyed upon travellers around the common, the most famous of which was the "Wicked Lady", a highwaywoman claimed, after her death, to have been Lady Katherine Ferrers of Markyate. Ferrers Lane, which runs through the middle of the common, takes its name from her, and her exploits are the subject of two films of that name. Also, a pub on the edge of the common is called The Wicked Lady.

Two murders are associated with the Common. In 1977 the body of 24-year-old Janie Shepherd, an Australian heiress, was dumped there; she had been raped and murdered. In 2009, a severed male forearm was discovered on a grass verge in Drovers Lane by a group of walkers. The arm proved to be part of the body of Jeffrey Howe, who had been stabbed to death and dismembered before his severed body parts were dumped across two counties.

== Sport ==
On 2 June 1833 Simon Byrne, the famous bare-knuckle fighter, died after a particularly bloody encounter at Nomansland which lasted no less than 99 rounds. His opponents, the seconds, and the referee were all convicted of manslaughter, and the local magistrates were censured for not stepping in to prevent the fight.

Thomas Coleman (1796-1877), a noted trainer, introduced the concept of steeplechasing into England as a spectator sport (although steeplechasing itself dated from nearly 75 years earlier, prior steeple chases had been between individuals). The first proper steeplechase in England was held at Nomansland in 1830. The sport rapidly became popular, although Coleman discontinued the steeplechase in 1839 when the Grand National was started.

Cock fighting, despite being illegal, is believed to have been carried on at the common until the early part of the 20th century.

== Modern recreational use ==
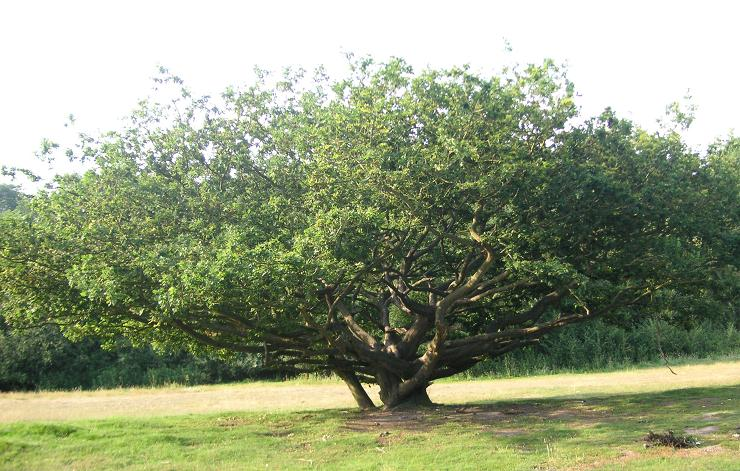
The climbing tree on Nomansland Common, popular with local children

Nomansland Common is bisected by Ferrers Lane (named after the Wicked Lady); the land to the south of the Lane is open grassland and is mostly used for dog walking, horse riding and picnics. The land to north has grown up into woodland, and also contains, as is well known to local children, what is believed to be "the best climbing tree in the world".

Nomansland is also popular for the local model aircraft flying club known as Nomansland Flyers which can normally be seen flying most commonly on a Saturday from lunch time up to 7 pm. The permitted flying times are as follows;

Electric Models : Daylight hours
I/C Models : Mon-Sat 10 am-7 pm
