= William Stevens (boxer) =

William Stevens, known as The Nailer, was a boxer, who attained notoriety for defeating Jack Slack in 1760. His reputation was greatly tarnished over an accusation that he threw his fight with George Meggs. Boxiana and Pugilistica recognise him as having been Champion of England from 1760 to 1761.

== Early career ==
In January 1760 Stevens defeated a butcher by the name of Swafford in about 15 minutes. On February of that same year, Stevens fought a Jacob Taplin, a Carman, who was favoured by three to one odds. The contest lasted about 12 minutes, before Stevens ultimately won. A later account published in the Sporting Magazine in 1798 states that Taplin was winning the contest and that Nailer was knocked down with punches to the stomach, before Stevens rose to knock down Taplin, who gave up in the next round. Taplin was reported to have had two of his ribs broke, and subsequently died from his injuries, however was reported as taking part in later contests.

== Contest with Jack Slack ==
On 17 May 1760, Stevens was reported to have sent a formal challenge to Jack Slack, noted for defeating Jack Broughton. The battle took place at the Tennis Court in Haymarket. After approximately three to three and a half minutes of fighting, at the end of the third round, a blow to the stomach caused Slack to yield.

The Chronology of Boxing in the 1797 Sporting Magazine stated Stevens intentionally hit Slack's right arm with his left fist, while landing to the head with his right and using his foot to trip Slack off balance to make his knockdowns heavier.

== Contest with George Meggs ==
In 1761, Stevens would fight George Meggs. The Bath Chronicle states that they each knocked the other down twice, before George Meggs scored six knockdowns in a row, showing both skill and strength to win. The Public Ledger was less favourable to the combatants, stating that Stevens missed Meggs with a punch, and subsequently got caught on the side of the head, before both held and fought defensively for 17 minutes before Stevens gave in.

Allegations that Stevens threw this contest would later tarnish Stevens and this fight. In Modern Manhood, Henry Lemoine states that Jack Slack had paid Stevens to throw his fight against Meggs. It quotes Stevens as saying "The day that I fought Jack Slack, I got ninety guineas; but I got forty more than I could have got otherwise, but letting Meggs beat me, and Dam'me, I'm the same man still." He further states that disgust at the fix not only damaged Stevens' reputation, but also caused the popularity of boxing itself to drop.

== Later career ==
In December 1761, Stevens fought Carrots, with each of their brothers also fighting. Stevens prevailed, however his brother lost. In June 1762, he was to fight a coach-spring maker named Turner, however this was reported to have been stopped due to legal interference.

In August 1767, the Nailer would fight William Darts, the Dyer. The odds favoured the Dyer 6 to 1, however Stevens won after 15 minutes. Henry Lemoine stated he won using the same technique the Sporting Magazine stated he used to defeat Slack. In 1769, Stevens was once again defeated, this time by George Milsom, in between six and seven minutes.

In September 1778 Stevens was defeated by Harry Sellers defeated Stevens after a hard fought contest lasting thirty minutes. By this time Stevens was reported to be fifty years old and in poor condition, however he succeeded in knocking Sellers down, he ultimately lost the contest.

== Legacy ==
William Stevens is regarded to have been the Champion of England, from his victory 1760 over Jack Slack to his 1761 defeat by George Meggs.

Stevens' reputation was greatly affected by the view that he lacked honesty. In Boxiana, Pierce Egan praised his strength and skill, but was scathing of his character while in Pugilistica, Henry Downes, states Stevens had the potential to be remembered alongside Jack Broughton, Jack Slack, and George Taylor, had he not been involved in the fix.
