= Simon Byrne =

Irish boxer

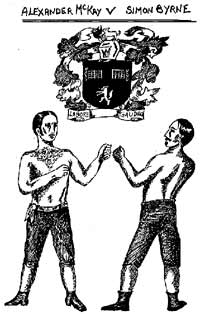
The only known image of Simon Byrne, a poster advertising the match between Alexander McKay (left) and Simon Byrne (right)

Simon Byrne (1806 – 2 June 1833), nicknamed "The Emerald Gem", was an Irish bare-knuckle prize fighter. The heavyweight boxing champion of Ireland, he was drawn to England by the larger sums of prize money on offer and his hopes of becoming the heavyweight champion there as well. He became one of only six fighters ever to have been involved in fatal fights as both survivor and deceased since records began in 1741.

Byrne fought in an era when English boxing, although illegal, was patronised by many powerful individuals. Its patronage and popularity did not, however, free it from corruption, heavy betting, and staged fights. Byrne fought eight recorded matches, but accounts of his career focus on the last three, against the Scottish champion Alexander McKay, the English champion Jem Ward, and James Burke for the vacant championship of England. The injuries McKay received in his fight with Byrne resulted in his death the following day, and rioting in his home country of Scotland. Byrne went on to lose his next match against Jem Ward, which some commentators believed he was not sufficiently in condition to fight. His final contest in May 1833 was a gruelling 99 rounds against James Burke that lasted for 3 hours and 6 minutes, the longest ever recorded prize fight. Byrne died three days later as the result of damage to his brain caused by the beating he had received. Burke was arrested and tried for manslaughter but was acquitted. Following the death in 1838 of another fighter, William Phelps, also known as Brighton Bill, the London Prize Ring Rules were introduced to more clearly define the rules of prize fighting and to introduce certain safety measures, rules that still form the basis for the modern sport of boxing.

== Early 19th-century English boxing ==
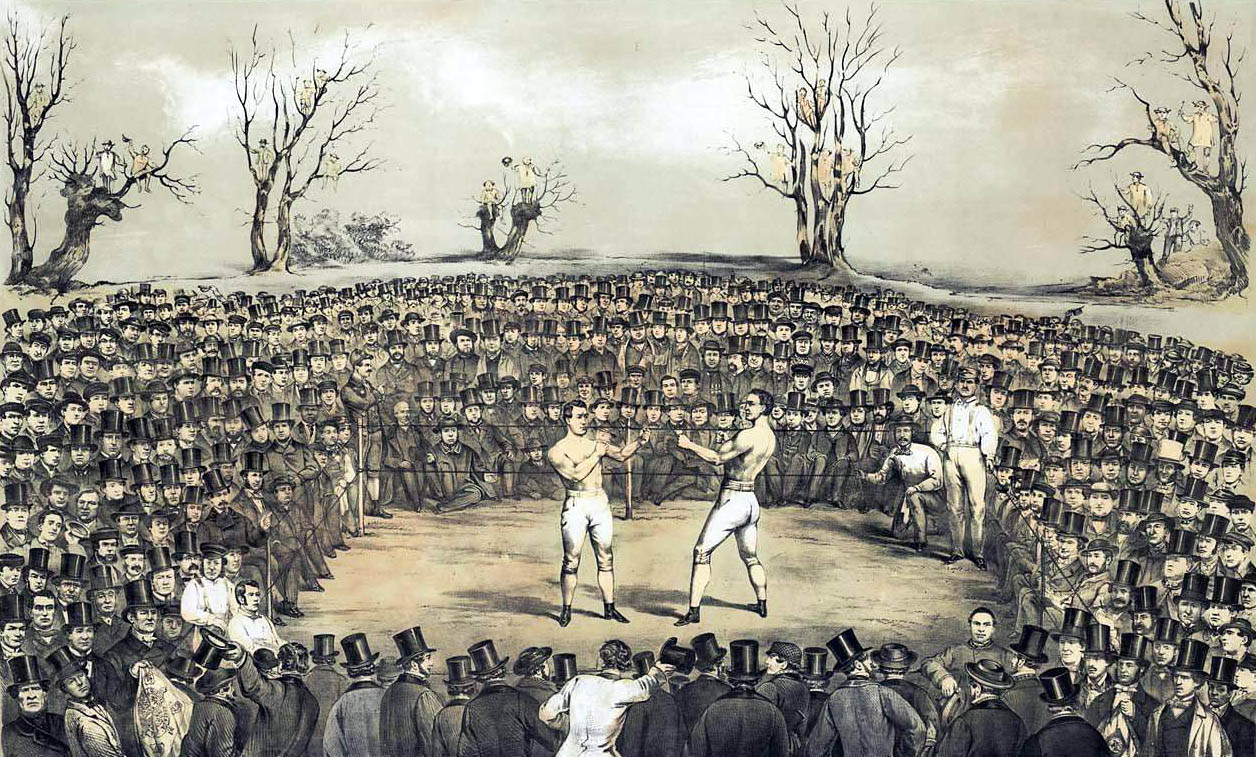
A typical 19th-century boxing match, often held in warehouses, courtyards of inns, or in open fields away from the eyes of local authorities. This painting was by Byrne's friend Jem Ward.

During the first half of the 19th century pugilism, better known as prize-fighting, held a curious position in British society. Although supported by members of the establishment from the royal princes downwards, it was considered illegal under the terms of the Riot Act of 1715, which defined a riot as "a tumultuous disturbance of the peace by three or more persons assembling together, of their own authority, with intent mutually to execute a violent enterprise to the terror of the people".

The boxer George Stevenson had died a few days after his 35-minute fight with the English champion Jack Broughton in 1741, an event that triggered Broughton to draw up a set of rules with the help of some of his patrons to prevent a recurrence. Published on 16 August 1743, Broughton's Rules outlawed hitting or seizing any part of an opponent's body below the waist, or striking him when he was down, but otherwise left much to the discretion of referees. Rounds were not of a fixed length but continued until one of the fighters was knocked or thrown to the ground, after which those in his corner were allowed 30 seconds to return him to the "scratch" – the middle of the ring – failing which his opponent was declared the victor.

The sport enjoyed an unprecedented surge in popularity during the Regency period when it was openly patronised by the Prince Regent (later George IV) and his brothers. Championship boxing matches acquired a louche reputation as the places to be seen by the wealthy upper classes. Thus, a match would often be attended by thousands of people, many of whom had wagered money on the outcome. The Duke of Cumberland (an uncle of King George III) was reported to have bet thousands of pounds on Jack Broughton, who was the English champion for 18 years.

Boxing had become a nest of "gambling related corruption" by the 1820s. The epitome of this era was the championship reign of Jem Ward, a fighter who on one occasion admitted taking £100, equivalent to several thousand pounds today, to lose a contest. By 1830 the sport had become widely known for its corruption, and blatant cheating was commonplace. It was against this background that Simon Byrne earned his living.

== Early life ==
Very little is known of Byrne's early life beyond the fact that he was born in Ireland in 1806. His first fight, in 1825, was a loss to Mike Larking; it lasted 138 rounds spread over 2 1/2 hours—despite the fact that at this time a round could vary in length, and usually only ended when a man was knocked down. His second fight was a draw against Jack Manning in 1826, earning Byrne £100. Next was Byrne's first match against the Scottish boxer Alexander McKay, which Byrne won easily in five rounds, earning him a further £100. This match was McKay's first ever prize-fight. This victory was soon followed by a win against Bob Avery, earning a further £50, then another win over Phil Samson in 1829, earning him £200. By the standards of the day these latter sums were enormous; it is therefore surprising that he was then offered £200 for a rematch, regardless of whether he won or not, against the less experienced McKay, whom he had beaten so easily on the first occasion. As of 2008 that would be the equivalent of about £13,600. (Note: Comparing relative purchasing power of £200 in 1830 with 2008.)

== Byrne versus McKay ==
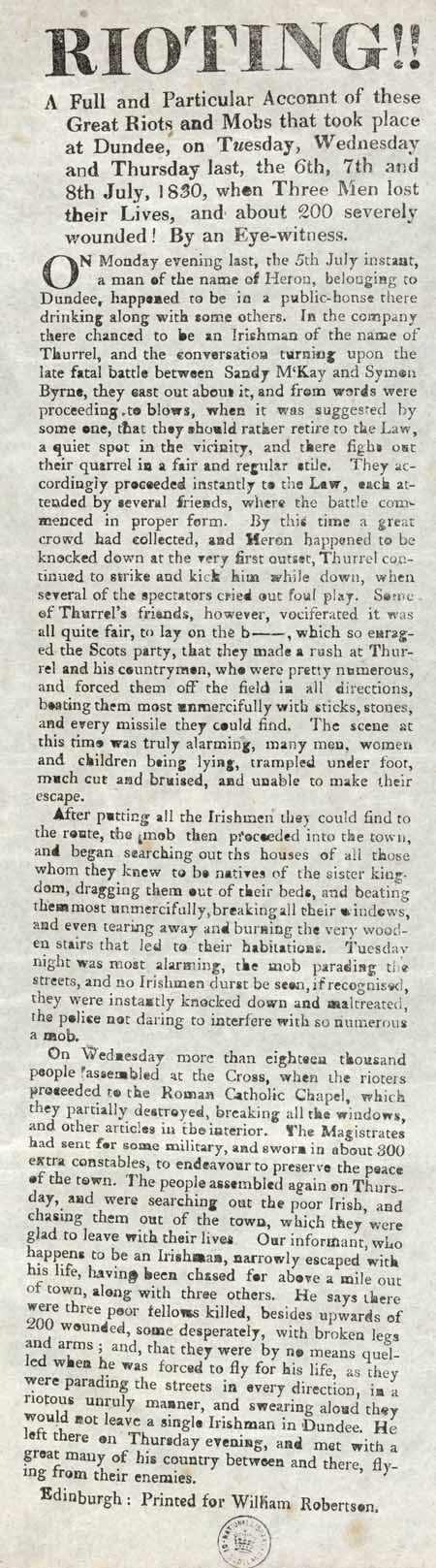
Newspaper report of rioting against the Irish population of Dundee following McKay's death

The fight against Alexander McKay was Byrne's first brush with notoriety. On 2 June 1830, Byrne, billed as "Champion of Ireland", fought McKay, the "Champion of Scotland", for the right to challenge Jem Ward, the heavyweight champion of England. The match had been organized at Tom Spring's "Castle Tavern", in Holborn. The former champion boxer Tom Spring, as treasurer of the "Fair Play Club" – the organization which oversaw boxing – was immensely influential in the boxing world. Along with two other well-known boxers, Gentleman Jackson and Tom Cribb (who also acted as Byrne's manager), he was Byrne's sponsor for the match. Cribb was considered to be one of the greatest fighters of the era; more than 20,000 people attended one of his fights.

Contracts were signed at Spring's tavern and it was arranged for the fight to take place at Hanslope, Buckinghamshire. But as a vast crowd of spectators began pouring into Hanslope the venue was switched at the last minute to Salcey Green, just inside Northamptonshire, thus rendering the Buckinghamshire constables powerless to prevent it.

Despite the publicity and billing this was only McKay's fifth prize-fight. Since his defeat at the hands of Byrne 2 1/2 years earlier, McKay had fought and won just three matches, earning him £180, while Byrne had earned £200. Both men were promised £200 for the match whatever its outcome. McKay had earned £100 for his previous fight against Paul Spencer, the most he had ever received; the promised payment was a huge improvement in his fortunes.

McKay's boxing relied on brute strength rather than scientific pugilistic theory, but the fight still lasted for 47 rounds before McKay collapsed under a left-handed punch to the throat that did not seem particularly powerful. He was carried to his corner, where he regained consciousness, complaining of severe headache. He was bled by a surgeon on the scene and taken to a local inn, the Watts Arms, where he died at 9:00 pm the following evening. A post mortem examination found the cause of death to be brain damage. McKay was buried in Hanslope Churchyard with the following inscription on his headstone:

Strong and athletic was my frame
Far from my native home I came
And bravely fought with Simon Byrne
Alas, but never to return.
Stranger take warning from my fate
Lest you should rue your case too late
If you have ever fought before
Determine now to fight no more

McKay's death attracted widespread publicity and led to rioting in the streets of his homeland. In Dundee, three people died and 200 were injured in the fracas. In Glasgow, four people died, and the Dragoons were called out to quell rioting after a Roman Catholic church was burned and looted (the mob would have assumed Byrne, an Irishman, to be a Roman Catholic). Byrne was arrested three days later on board the ferry to Ireland as he tried to leave the country. He was incarcerated in Buckingham Gaol to await his trial and the prospect of the gallows.

== Trial ==
The trial was held at the Assizes in the small rural market town of Buckingham. More used to the trials of local poachers and sheep thieves, Buckingham had never before seen such a spectacle. The town was inundated with journalists and the merely curious. Byrne was charged with manslaughter. Tom Cribb, Reuben Martin, Thomas Reynolds, and George Cooper were charged with aiding and abetting manslaughter. With such illustrious names as Cribb's, Jackson's and Spring's involved, the trial had the potential to turn into a huge establishment scandal. People of all classes had bet hundreds of pounds on the outcome of the boxing match. Despite being banned, prize fighting enjoyed huge public support and patronage from levels up to the younger male members of the royal family, some of whom Jackson had taught to box. The support received by Byrne at his trial is testimony to the wealth of his backers. The establishment rallied to his support; Byrne was represented by three barristers and five solicitors, and twelve witnesses journeyed from London to give evidence on his behalf.

The defence produced a witness who claimed to have seen McKay fall and strike his head on some stones several hours before the fight, and the Glasgow Free Press began a rumour that McKay had been drugged by "a sleeping draught" introduced into his water bottle. That the fight was illegal, as was the public assembly of spectators does not seem to have been considered in court. This benign neglect is surprising because as recently as 1825, in the case of Rex v. Billingham, Savage and Skinner, it had been deemed that anyone even attending a fight was guilty of an offence.

At the trial Byrne was described by a Bow Street Runner as a "very human kind man", and McKay as "a very large muscular man – a magnificent man". The jury came to a verdict after only ten minutes of deliberation: "Not guilty". Byrne was once again a free man, but the image of the sport had been damaged. The Times of 5 June 1830 condemned the "barbarous, filthy and swindling exhibitions called prize fights" and expressed the hope that "an example will be made of the more wealthy monsters in this affair of blood – the sanguinary cowards who stood by and saw a fellow creature beaten to death for their sport and gain!"

As the "wealthy monsters" patronising boxing included King George IV (who had asked Gentleman Jackson and the country's leading pugilists to act as pages at his coronation in 1821) and his heir, the Duke of Clarence, The Times's words fell on deaf ears, and the sport continued unabated. The following year a similar legal case occurred when another boxer was killed. However, in this instance less wealthy patrons and illustrious names were involved, and the manager of the convicted boxer, unlike Tom Cribb, was found guilty of abetting manslaughter and sentenced to 14 years transportation.

== Byrne versus Ward ==
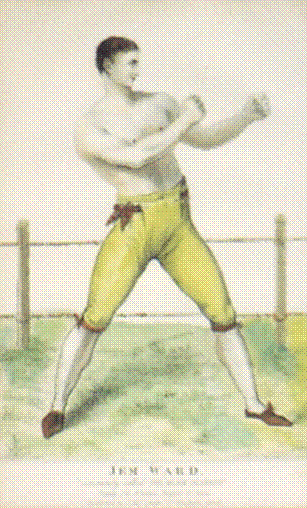
Jem Ward, c. 1825

Cleared of any responsibility for McKay's death, Byrne collected his £200 prize money, and as the winner earned the right to fight the English heavyweight champion Jem Ward. The fight was originally scheduled to take place at Leicester on 10 March 1829, but at the last minute Ward claimed that he was unfit and too ill to fight, much to the disapproval of his backers and friends. Rumours circulated that Ward had refused to enter the ring unless he received a prize money of £250 plus an additional £250 if he lost; the event became known in some quarters as the Leicester Hoax. Ward did not fight again for two years, but he and Byrne finally met on 12 July 1831 at Willeycott, near Stratford upon Avon. Each fighter was paid £200. Although Ward was the older man he prevailed in the contest after one hour and seventeen minutes, when Byrne's seconds, Tom Spring and Tom Reynolds, withdrew their man in the 33rd round.

An observer commented that Byrne may not have been in the best of condition for the fight, as "his appearance failed to favour the impression that he possessed active vigour"; boxing historian Gilbert Odd describes the fight as "disgraceful". Another commentator noted that "it is a singular fact that neither of the men had a black eye; neither had an external cut worth mentioning".

== Byrne versus Burke ==
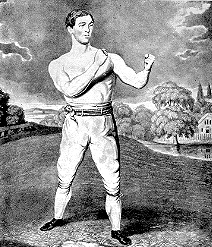
James Burke, nicknamed "The Deaf Un" or "Deaf Burke"

Jem Ward announced his retirement from the ring in a letter published in the 29 January edition of Bell's Life in London. He was succeeded as champion of England by James Burke, although some disputed Burke's right to the title as Ward had refused to fight him before retiring. Standing 6 feet 2 inches (1.88 m) tall, weighing 200 lb (90 kg), and handicapped by deafness, Burke had assumed the championship after defeating Harry Macone in one of the prolonged and brutal fights for which he was known. Ward, who had faced public criticism for his refusal to fight Burke, felt that Byrne was the better fighter and promised to acknowledge the victor of a fight between Burke and Byrne as the new champion. The match took place on 30 May 1833 on Nomansland, a tract of common land between the villages of Sandridge and Wheathampstead in Hertfordshire, for a prize of £100 to each man. To get himself into condition for the fight, Byrne had reduced his weight from 210 pounds (95 kg) to 186 pounds (84 kg), an effort that "as it was effected by hard work and sweating, somewhat impaired his natural stamina, especially as, his habits being far from abstemious when in Ireland, he was scarcely fitted to undergo the necessary amount of labour". Despite his hard work Byrne looked "fleshy", with "no special show of muscle", compared to Burke's "perfect condition", although he did have a slight height advantage. Burke weighed in at 172 pounds (78 kg), and started the contest as the marginal favourite at odds of 5–4.

Tom Spring was once again in Byrne's corner, as was Jem Ward. In true Burke style the match lasted for 3 hours and 6 minutes, during which time 99 rounds were fought the longest ever recorded prize fight. For the most part Byrne seemed to be in control in the early stages of the fight; in the 30th round he trapped Burke against the ropes and battered him severely around the body before throwing him to the ground. Burke fell on his face, vomiting and throwing up blood, and for the next few rounds Byrne looked the more likely winner. By the 49th round however, Burke had recovered sufficiently to knock Byrne to the ground, whose hands by then were so swollen that he was unable to deliver a finishing blow. By the 93rd round Byrne was "scarcely able to stand, and rolled before the Deaf'un like a ship in a storm". Although both men were utterly exhausted Burke continued to "pepper away at [Byrne's] body and head", until in the 99th round Byrne collapsed unconscious and could not be revived to take his place once again at the scratch. A contemporary newspaper report of the day describes a blow-by-blow account of a fair match. (Note: The report accounts for only 27 of the 99 rounds.)

Byrne was carried to "The Woolpack" inn in nearby St Albans, where he was attended to by Tom Spring. On the evening of the fight Byrne was considered to be close to death, but over the course of the following two days he seemed to be recovering, and was sufficiently conscious to thank his friends for their ministrations. But his condition worsened during the afternoon of Saturday 1 June 1833, and he died the following day; the cause of death was given as "congestion of blood in the brain". Byrne himself was reportedly of a different opinion, telling a chambermaid shortly before his death that "If I should die, it will not be from the beating I received but from mortification. I would rather have died than been beaten in that fight." He left behind a wife and four children in Dublin.

== Aftermath ==
One contemporary view of Byrne's fatal fight, and of his earlier contest against Ward, was expressed in a popular poem written by James Catnach, the catchpenny publisher of Seven Dials, London:

On Thursday, 30 May day, Brave Simon took the ring,
Back'd by Jem Ward the champion, likewise by Gallant Spring,
To fight Burke for two hundred pounds, a man of courage bold,
To stop reports that with Ward the battle he had sold.

Burke was arrested and tried for manslaughter. He was acquitted on 11 July 1833, but avoided competitive fights for some time afterwards, only taking part in exhibition matches. He retired in 1843 and died of tuberculosis less than two years later in 1845, having by then been reduced to poverty.

Following the death in 1838 of another fighter, William Phelps, also known as Brighton Bill, in a match against Owen Swift, the London Prize Ring Rules were introduced by the Pugilists's Protective Association to more clearly define the range of fouls and to introduce certain safety measures. Butting, gouging, biting, scratching, kicking were all forbidden as was the use of stones or any hard object in the hand. Thirty-second breaks were introduced between rounds, at the end of which each fighter had to walk to the scratch unaided within 8 seconds. The wearing of spiked boots was prohibited, and boxers who went to ground without being hit were disqualified. These rules still form the basis for the modern sport of boxing.

== See also ==
- List of bare-knuckle boxers
