= Bare-knuckle boxing =

Boxing without the use of boxing gloves

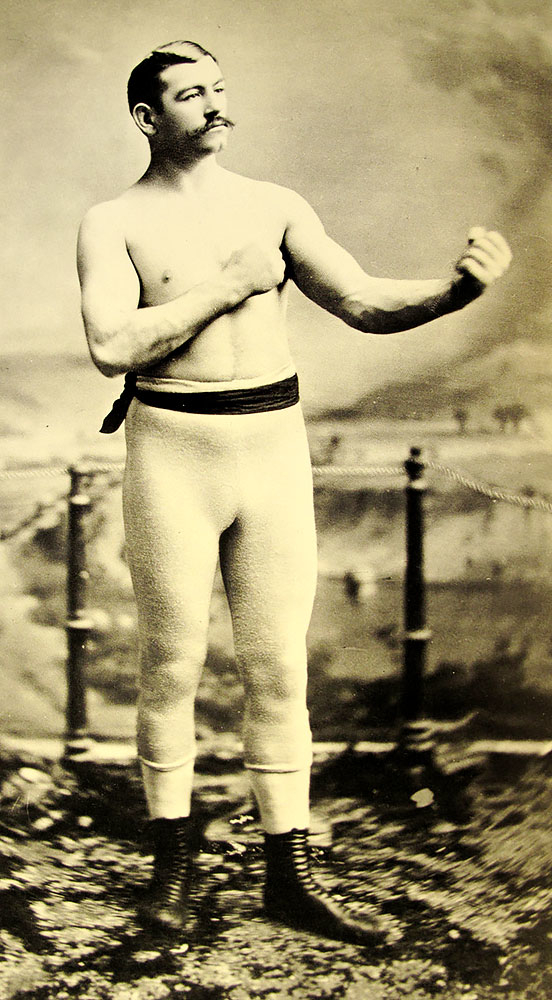
- Irish-American fighter John L. Sullivan
- Also known as: Classical pugilism; fisticuffs; fist fight; illegal boxing; prizefighting
- Focus: Striking; grappling
- Country of origin: England
- Parenthood: Ancient Greek boxing; street fighting

Bare-knuckle boxing (also known as bare-knuckle or bare-knuckle fighting) is a full-contact combat sport based on punching without any form of padding on the hands. The sport, as it is known today, originated in 17th-century England and, although similar, it differs from street fighting as it follows an accepted set of rules.

The rules that provided the foundation for bare-knuckle boxing for much of the 18th and 19th centuries were the London Prize Ring Rules. By the late 19th century, professional boxing moved from bare-knuckle to using boxing gloves. The last major world heavyweight championship held under bare-knuckle boxing rules happened in 1889 and was held by John L. Sullivan. The American National Police Gazette magazine was recognized as sanctioning the world championship titles.

Bare-knuckle boxing has seen a resurgence in the 21st century with English promoters such as Bare Knuckle Boxing (BKB) in Coventry and Ultimate Bare Knuckle Boxing (UBKB) in Warrington, as well as American promoters Bare Knuckle Fighting Championship (BKFC) in Philadelphia and BYB Extreme (BYB) in Miami.

== Early history ==
The sport as it is known today originated in England. According to the boxing chronicle Pugilistica, the first newspaper report of a boxing match in England dates from 1681, when the Protestant Mercury stated: "Yesterday a match of boxing was performed before his Grace the Duke of Albemarle, between the Duke's footman and a butcher. The latter won the prize, as he hath done many before, being accounted, though but a little man, the best at that exercise in England."

The first bare-knuckle champion of England was James Figg, who claimed the title in 1719 and held it until his retirement in 1730. Before Jack Broughton, the first idea of current boxing originated from James Figg, who is viewed as the organizer of cutting edge boxing. In 1719, he set up a 'pugilistic foundation' and charged himself as 'a professional in the Noble Science of Defence' to instruct boxers on the utilisation of clench hands, sword, and quarterstaff. Noted champions were Jack Broughton, Elizabeth Wilkinson, Daniel Mendoza, Jem Belcher, Hen Pearce, John Gully, Tom Cribb, Tom Spring, Jem Ward, James Burke, William "Bendigo" Thompson, Ben Caunt, William Perry, Tom Sayers and Jem Mace.

The record for the longest bare-knuckle fight is listed as 6 hours and 15 minutes for a match between James Kelly and Jonathan Smith, fought near Fiery Creek in Australia on 3 December 1855, when Smith gave in after 17 rounds.

The bare-knuckle fighter Jem Mace is listed as having the longest professional career of any fighter in history. He fought for more than 35 years into his 60s, and recorded his last exhibition bout in 1909 at the age of 78.

Professional bare-knuckle boxing was never legal under any federal or state laws in the United States until Wyoming became the first to legalize on 20 March 2018. Prior to that date, the chief sanctioning organization for bare-knuckle boxing was the magazine National Police Gazette, which set up matches and issued championship belts throughout the 1880s. The Police Gazette sanctioned what is considered the last major bare-knuckle heavyweight world championship, between John L. Sullivan and Jake Kilrain on 8 July 1889, with Sullivan emerging as the victor.

Other noted champions were Tom Hyer, Yankee Sullivan, Nonpareil Dempsey, Tom Sharkey, Bob Fitzsimmons, and John Morrissey.

=== Rules ===
Classical pugilism began to adopt rules by the mid-18th century to decrease cases of injuries and death, while also showcasing the sport as a respectable athletic endeavor. There were two rules that were adopted until the acceptance of modern gloved boxing.

- Broughton Rules: The first set of rules devised by champion Jack Broughton in 1743. Under Broughton's rules, a round continued until a man went down; after 30 seconds he had to face his opponent (square off), standing no more than a yard (about a metre) away, or be declared beaten. Hitting a downed opponent, as well as grabs and throws below the waist, were also forbidden.
- London Prize Ring Rules: A new set of rules initiated by the British Pugilists' Protective Association in 1838 and further revised in 1853. The new rules provided for a ring 24 feet (7.32 metres) square bounded by two ropes. When a fighter went down, the round ended, and he was helped to his corner. The next round would begin 30 seconds later, with each boxer required to reach, unaided, a mark in the centre of the ring. If a fighter could not reach that mark by the end of 8 additional seconds, he was declared the loser. Kicking, gouging, butting with the head, biting, and low blows were all declared fouls.

== Techniques ==
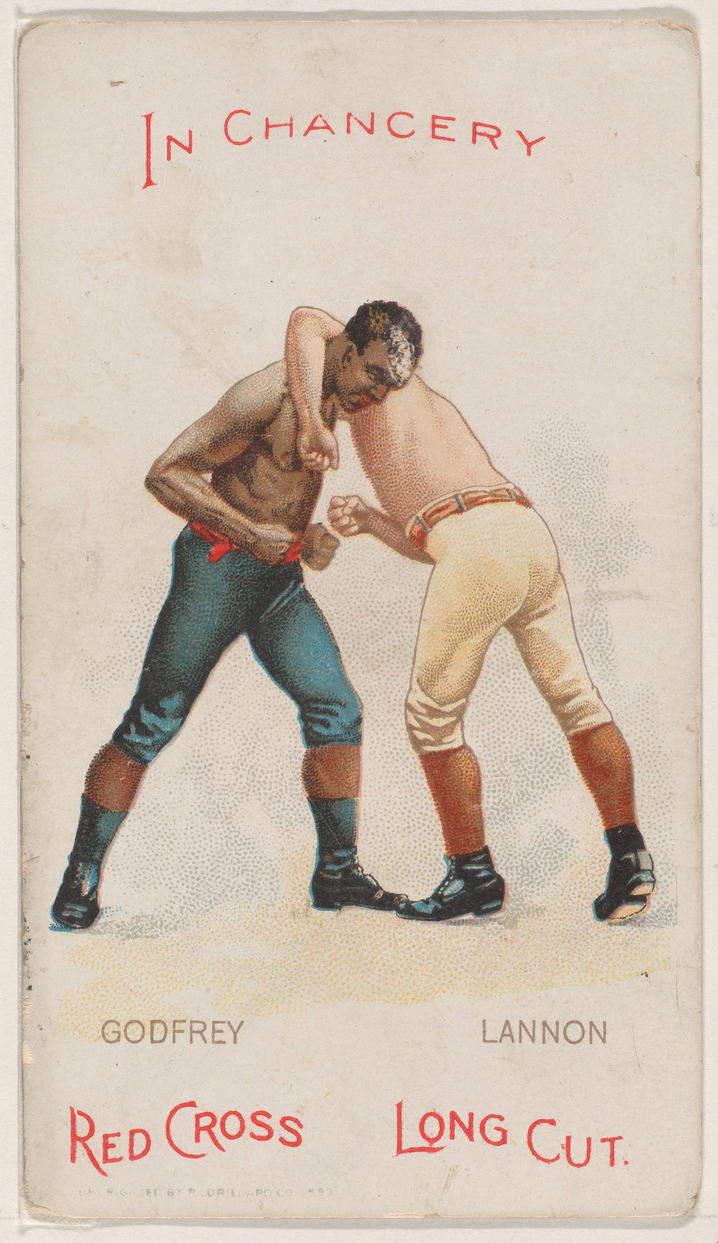
Depiction of bare-knuckle boxers George Godfrey vs. Joe Lannon in chancery

Early fighting had no written rules. There were no weight divisions or round limits and no referee, resulting in very chaotic fights. An early account of boxing was published in Nottingham in 1713 by Sir Thomas Parkyns, 2nd Baronet, a landowner in Bunny, Nottinghamshire, who had practised the techniques he described. The article, a single page in his manual of wrestling and fencing, Progymnasmata: The inn-play, or Cornish-hugg wrestler, described a system of headbutting, punching, eye-gouging, chokes, and hard throws that are not recognised in boxing today. Consequently, there were no round limits to fights. When a man could not come to scratch, he would be declared loser and the fight would be brought to a halt. Fights could also end if broken up beforehand by crowd riot, police interference or chicanery, or if both men were willing to accept that the contest was a draw. While fights could have enormous numbers of rounds, the rounds in practice could be quite short with fighters pretending to go down from minor blows to take advantage of the 30-second rest period.

Even though the Broughton Rules attempted to make boxing more civilized, there were still many techniques in this era that are illegal in today's gloved boxing. However, there were also new revolutionary moves, still in-use today, that were formulated during that time. Grappling was allowed and many favored the use of cross-buttock throw and suplexes, although grabs below the waist were prohibited. Clinching, known as chancery, were also legal and in-use. Fibbing, where a boxer grabs hold of an opponent by the neck or hair before pummeling him multiple times, were allowed. The traditional bare-knuckle boxing stance was actually designed to combat against the use of grappling as well as block punching. Kicking was also allowed in boxing at that time, with William "Bendigo" Thompson being an expert in kicks during his fight with Ben Caunt, and the Lancanshire Navigator using purring kicks in his battle with Tom Cribb.

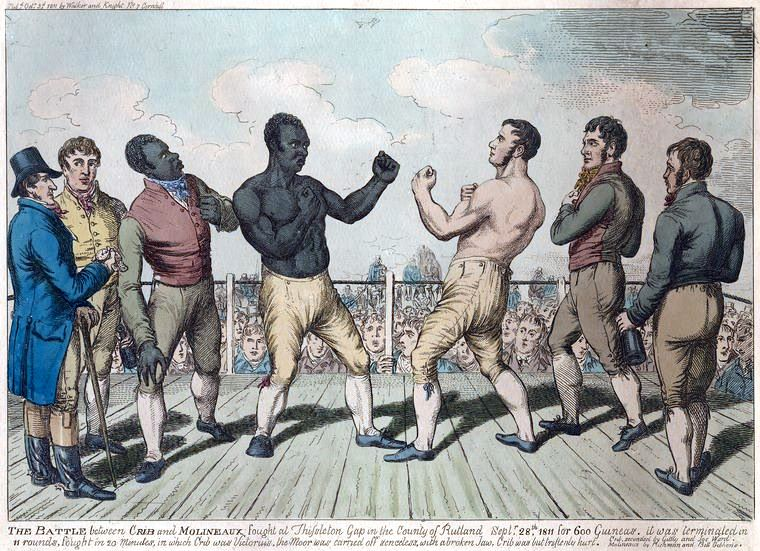
Tom Molineaux (left) vs Tom Cribb in a re-match for the heavyweight championship of England, 1811.

It was during classical pugilism where many famous boxing techniques were invented. Samuel Elias was the first to invent a punch that later became known as the uppercut. Tom Spring popularized the use of the left hook and created a technique called the "Harlequin Step", where he would put himself just within reach of his opponent, then avoiding the instinctive punch while simultaneously delivering one himself; basically inventing the boxing feint. Daniel Mendoza also popularized the outboxer-style of boxing.

=== Irish stand down ===
The Irish stand down is a form of traditional bare-knuckle fighting in which lateral movement and evasive maneuvering are minimized or eliminated, emphasizing sustained, close-range striking exchanges. Unlike conventional bare-knuckle boxing, which incorporates footwork and distance management, stand down fighting places participants in a fixed or near-fixed position, often described as "toe-to-toe," where fighters exchange punches with limited opportunity to disengage.

In some accounts, the practice is associated with strap fighting, in which the fighters' non-striking hands are bound together to restrict movement and enforce continuous engagement, though historical descriptions vary and such binding was not universal.

This form of combat was reported to be particularly prevalent in Irish-American working-class communities during the late 19th century, especially within urban neighborhoods where informal fighting traditions persisted alongside broader practices of faction fighting. Over time, it declined in popularity as more structured forms of combat emerged, first under bare-knuckle prizefighting conventions such as the London Prize Ring Rules and later under gloved boxing governed by the Marquess of Queensberry Rules.

The Irish stand down is also referred to as "strap fighting" or "toe-to-toe", although the terms are not always used consistently in historical sources.

== Modern bare-knuckle boxing ==
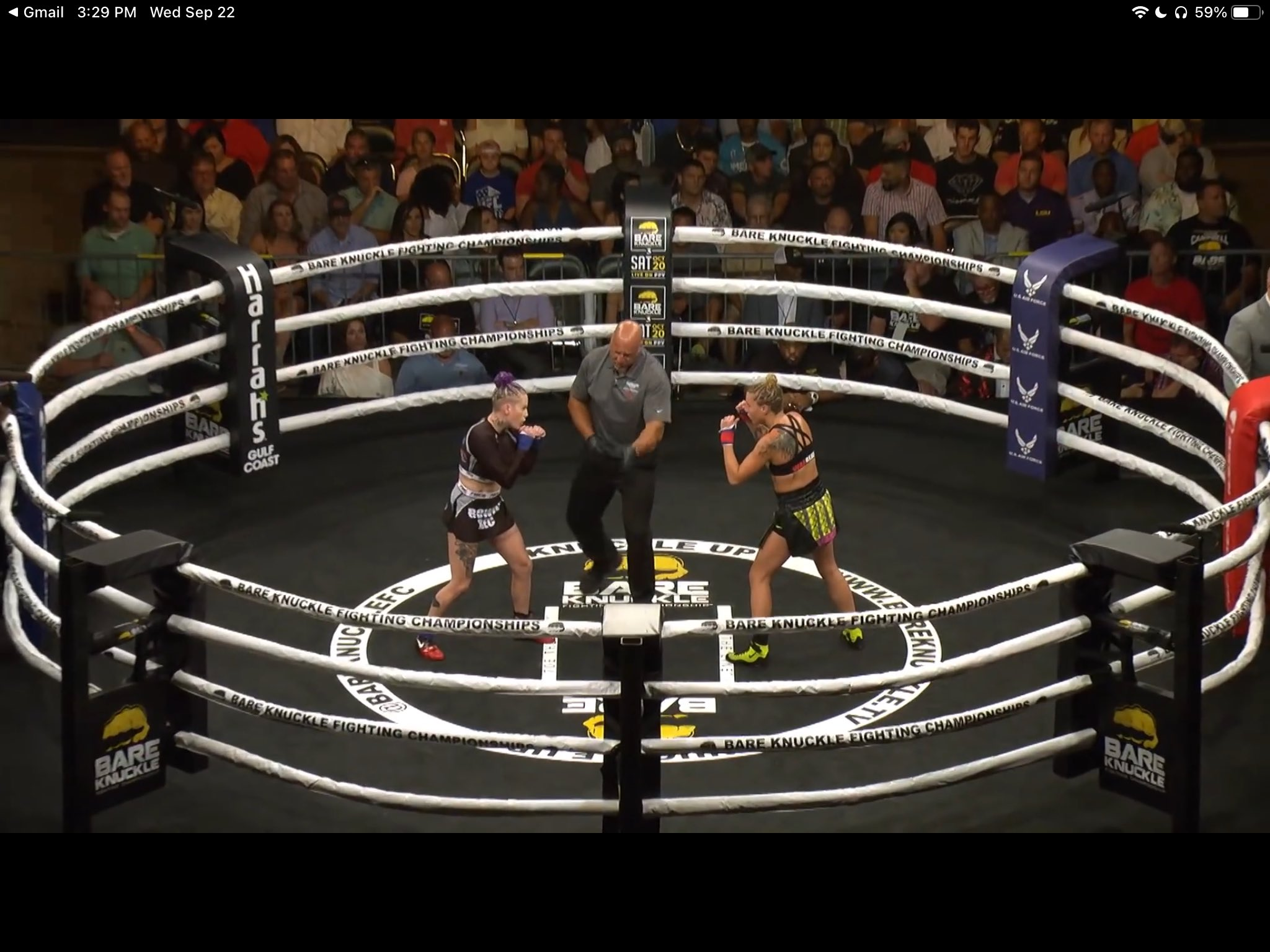
A match of the Bare Knuckle Fighting Championship (BKFC), an example of modern bareknuckle boxing

After more than a century, bare-knuckle boxing returned legally to the UK in Kettering on 29 June 2015. The show was promoted by UBBAD, headed by Joe Smith-Brown and Jim Freeman, founders of BKB Bare Knuckle Boxing. They discovered that, by law, fighters would have to wear hand wraps in order to compete in bare-knuckle contests legally.

With the resurgence of bare-knuckle boxing in the 21st century, several modifications have been made to classical rules that controlled historical bare-knuckle boxing. Additionally, there are several changes from the Marquess of Queensberry Rules. Most notably, there is an 18-second count on any knockdown in the BKB, although the BKFC and BYB Extreme use the traditional 10-count. In most modern bare-knuckle promotions, there is no three-knockdown rule and fighters cannot be saved by the bell. Fights consist of 5 rounds of 2 minutes in BKFC, both for non-title and title fights. In BKB and BYB Extreme, non-title fights are 5 rounds of 3 minutes while title fights are 7 rounds of 3 minutes. Female fights in both BKB and BYB Extreme are shortened to two-minute rounds. One of the distinguishing characteristics of modern bare-knuckle boxing is the inclusion of punching in the clinch, also known as "dirty boxing". In BKB, punching in the clinch is prohibited and fights can range from 3 rounds of 3 minutes to 7 rounds of 3 minutes.

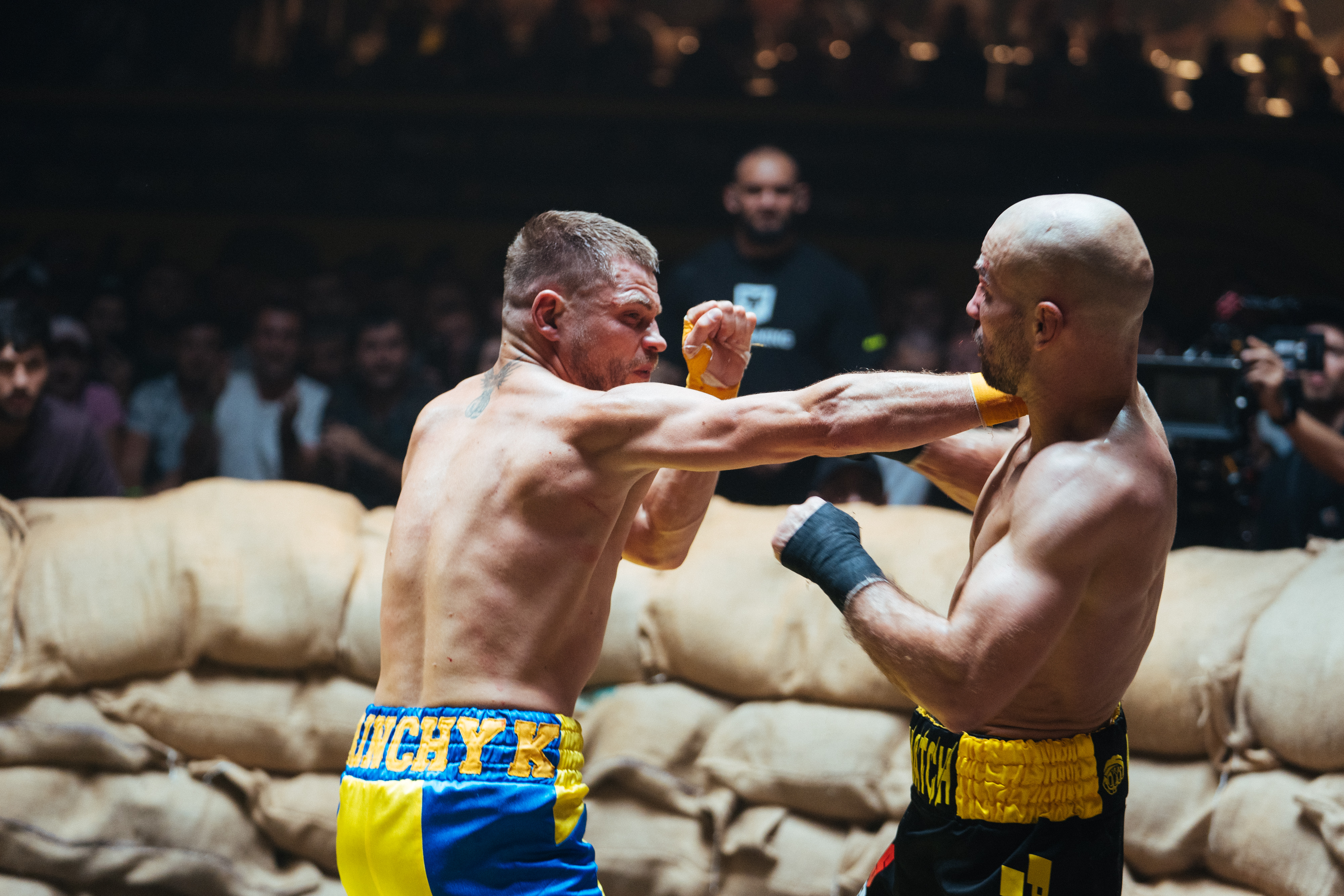
Modern bareknuckle boxing match in Kyiv, 2020

In October 2021, BKFC Thailand (later renamed BKFC Asia) was established as the officially licensed branch of Bare Knuckle Fighting Championship (BKFC) in Asia. It hosted its first event, titled BKFC Thailand 1: The Game Changer on 18 December 2021, at the Pattaya Exhibition And Convention Hall in Pattaya. BKFC Thailand became the first promotion to receive full licensing and sanctioning for bare-knuckle boxing in Thailand and Asia.

On 26 February 2022, Swedish fighter Mathilda Wilson defeated English fighter (and late replacement) Taylor Reeves in the UK's first legal female bare-knuckle fight in the modern era. The bout was held in Wolverhampton and was sanctioned and governed by the International Sport Kickboxing Association, with Wilson winning by first-round TKO to become the first Scandinavian woman ever to compete professionally in bare-knuckle boxing.

In September 2022, it was announced that Bare Knuckle Fighting Championship had acquired the UK organisation Bare Fist Boxing Association (BFBA) to form Bare Knuckle Fighting Championship UK (BKFC UK). The move meant that BKFC would now regularly hold shows throughout the United Kingdom.

In 2025, mixed martial arts fighter Ricardo "Loco" Arreola created what would be the first bare-knuckle boxing promotion in Mexico, Clandestino FC.

=== Bare Knuckle Fighting Championship rules ===
1. Fighters are permitted to wrap and tape the wrist, thumb, and mid-hand. No gauze or tape can be within 1 inch (25 mm) of the knuckles.
2. Fighters will "toe the line". There are two lines, 3 feet (91 cm) apart, in the center of the ring where the fighters will start each round. The front foot will be on the line, and the referee will instruct the fighters to "knuckle up", which indicates the beginning of the bout/round.
3. Punches are the only strike allowed and must be with a closed fist (no kicks, elbows, knees or grappling).
4. In the clinch, the fighter may punch his way out with the open hand. If there is a three-second lull in action while clinching, the referee will break the fighters.
5. A fighter who is knocked down will have 10 seconds to return to his feet, or the referee will stop the fight. It is not permitted to hit a downed fighter. Any fighter who does will be disqualified, and the purse will be withheld. While a fighter is downed, the other fighter will be instructed to report to a neutral space.
6. If a fighter is cut and the blood is impairing a fighter's vision, the referee may call a timeout to give the cutman 30 seconds to stop the bleeding. If the blood cannot be controlled and the blood inhibits the fighter's vision, the referee will stop the fight and award victory to the other fighter.
7. Fights are two minutes per round and each bout will be 3 or 5 rounds in length. In BKB can be 3, 5 or 7.
8. All fighters must wear a groin protector with a cup, a mouthpiece, trunks or boxing trunks, and boxing/wrestling shoes.
9. All fighters are expected to give 100% effort and behave with complete sportsmanship.

=== Current titleholders ===
==== Police Gazette ====
Weight class	Holder
Police Gazette
World Heavyweight	Arnold Adams
World Cruiserweight	Marko Martinjak
World Light Heavyweight	Cub Hawkins
World Middleweight	Barrie Jones
World Welterweight	Seth Shaffer
World Lightweight	Luis Palomino
World Bantamweight	Johnny Bedford
World Women's Featherweight	Paty Juarez
World Women's Flyweight	Christine Ferea
World Women's Super Welterweight	Jozette Cotton

==== Bare Knuckle Boxing (BKB) ====
Weight class	Holder
World
Heavyweight / +16 st (224.0 lb; 101.6 kg)	Richie Leak
Cruiserweight / 16 st (224.0 lb; 101.6 kg)	Carl Hobley
Light Heavyweight / 15 st (210.0 lb; 95.3 kg)	vacant
Super Middleweight / 14.5 st (203.0 lb; 92.1 kg)	Marko Martinjak
Middleweight / 14 st (196.0 lb; 88.9 kg)	Dan Lerwell
Super Welterweight / 13.5 st (189.0 lb; 85.7 kg)	Jimmy Sweeney
Welterweight / 13 st (182.0 lb; 82.6 kg)	Jimmy Sweeney
Lightweight / 12.5 st (175.0 lb; 79.4 kg)	James Connelly
Featherweight / 12 st (168.0 lb; 76.2 kg)	Barrie Jones
Bantamweight / 11.5 st (161.0 lb; 73.0 kg)	Barrie Jones
Flyweight / 11 st (154.0 lb; 69.9 kg)	Scott McHugh
Minimumweight / 10.5 st (147.0 lb; 66.7 kg)	vacant
British
Heavyweight	Kevin Greenwood
Cruiserweight	Bradley Scott
Light Heavyweight	vacant
Super Middleweight	Dave Thomas
Middleweight	Dan Lerwell
Super Welterweight	Danylo Hrebenuyk
Welterweight	Marley Churcher
Lightweight	Ionel Levitchi
Featherweight	Martin Refell
Bantamweight	Aaron McCallum
Flyweight	Liam Rees
Minimumweight	Jonny Jones

==== BYB Extreme (BYB) ====
Weight class	Holder
BYB
Heavyweight	Gustavo Trujillo
Light Heavyweight / 175 lb (79.4 kg; 12.5 st)	Gregoris Cisneros
Super Middleweight / 165 lb (74.8 kg; 11.8 st)	LT Nelson
Middleweight / 160 lb (72.6 kg; 11.4 st)	LT Nelson
Welterweight / 147 lb (66.7 kg; 10.5 st)	Carlos Alexandre
Lightweight / 135 lb (61.2 kg; 9.6 st)	Julio Tanori
Featherweight / 125 lb (56.7 kg; 8.9 st)	Harold McQueen
Women's Super Welterweight / 154 lb (69.9 kg; 11.0 st)	Jozette Cotton
Women's Super Lightweight / 140 lb (63.5 kg; 10.0 st)	Khortni Kamyron
Women's Lightweight / 135 lb (61.2 kg; 9.6 st)	Paty Juarez
Women's Featherweight / 125 lb (56.7 kg; 8.9 st)	Helen Peralta
Women's Super Flyweight / 115 lb (52.2 kg; 8.2 st)	Agnesa Kirakosian

==== Bare Knuckle Fighting Championship (BKFC) ====
Weight class	Holder
BKFC
Heavyweight / 265 lb (120.2 kg; 18.9 st)	Mick Terrill
Cruiserweight / 205 lb (93.0 kg; 14.6 st)	Alessio Sakara
Light Heavyweight / 185 lb (83.9 kg; 13.2 st)	Mike Richman
Middleweight / 175 lb (79.4 kg; 12.5 st)	David Mundell
Welterweight / 165 lb (74.8 kg; 11.8 st)	Austin Trout
Lightweight / 155 lb (70.3 kg; 11.1 st)	Franco Tenaglia
Bantamweight / 135 lb (61.2 kg; 9.6 st)	Alberto Blas
Women's Flyweight / 125 lb (56.7 kg; 8.9 st)	Christine Ferea
Women's Strawweight / 115 lb (52.2 kg; 8.2 st)	Britain Hart

==== Bare Knuckle Fighting Championship Asia (BKFC Asia) ====
Weight class	Holder
BKFC Asia
Light Heavyweight / 185 lb (83.9 kg; 13.2 st)	Sirimongkol Singmanasak
Featherweight / 145 lb (65.8 kg; 10.4 st)	Kritsana Srisang
Women's Strawweight / 115 lb (52.2 kg; 8.2 st)	Po Denman

==== Bare Knuckle Fighting Championship UK (BKFC UK) ====
Weight class	Holder
BKFC UK
Cruiserweight / 205 lb (93.0 kg; 14.6 st)	Anthony Holmes
Light Heavyweight / 185 lb (83.9 kg; 13.2 st)	Danny Christie
Featherweight / 145 lb (65.8 kg; 10.4 st)	Ellis Shepherd

==== Hardcore Fighting Championship ====
Weight class	Holder
Hardcore FC
Heavyweight	Timur Slashinin
Light heavyweight / 93 kg (205.0 lb; 14.6 st)	Vitaly Ananin
Middleweight / 84 kg (185.2 lb; 13.2 st)	Muhamed Kalmykov
Welterweight / 77 kg (169.8 lb; 12.1 st)	vacant
Lightweight / 70 kg (154.3 lb; 11.0 st)	Emil Novruzov
Featherweight / 66 kg (145.5 lb; 10.4 st)	Timur Musaev

==== Top Dog Fighting Championship ====
Weight class	Holder
Top Dog
Light heavyweight / 94 kg (207.2 lb; 14.8 st)	Oleg Fomichev
Middleweight / 85 kg (187.4 lb; 13.4 st)	Magomed Magomedov
Welterweight / 77 kg (169.8 lb; 12.1 st)	Nabi Gajiev
Lightweight / 70 kg (154.3 lb; 11.0 st)	Kantemir Kalazhokov
Featherweight / 64 kg (141.1 lb; 10.1 st)	Shakhobiddin Egamov
Bantamweight / 59 kg (130.1 lb; 9.3 st)	Chingiz Salbyryn

==== Gromda Fight Club ====
Weight class	Holder
GROMDA
Openweight	Mateusz Kubiszyn
NITRO / 80 kg (176.4 lb; 12.6 st)	Mateusz Ziomek
GROMDA International
Openweight	vacant

== List of English Heavyweight Bare-Knuckle Boxing Champions ==
- James Figg 1719–1730
- Tom Pipes 1730–1734
- George Taylor (boxer) 1734–1736
- Jack Broughton 1736–1750
- Jack Slack (boxer) 1750–1760
- William Stevens (boxer) 1760–1761
- George Meggs 1761–1762
- Tom Juchau 1765–1766
- William Darts 1766–1769
- Tom Lyons (boxer) 1769
- Willam Darts 1769–1771
- Peter Corcoran 1771–1776
- Harry Sellers 1776–1779
- Duggan Fearns 1779
- Tom Johnson 1787–1791
- Benjamin Brain 1791–1794
- Daniel Mendoza 1794–1795
- John Jackson 1795–1796
- Thomas Owen 1796–1797
- Jack Bartholomew 1797–1800
- Jem Belcher 1800–1805
- Hen Pearce 1805–1807
- John Gully 1807–1808
- Tom Cribb 1808–1822
- Tom Spring 1823–1824
- Tom Cannon 1824–1825
- Jem Ward 1825–1827
- Peter Crawley (boxer) 1827
- Jem Ward 1827–1832
- James Burke (boxer) 1833–1839
- William Thompson (boxer) 1839–1840
- Ben Caunt 1840–1841
- Nick Ward (boxer) 1841
- Ben Caunt 1841–1845
- William Thompson (boxer) 1845–1850
- William Perry (boxer) 1850–1851
- Harry Broome 1851–1856
- Tom Paddock 1856–1858
- Tom Sayers 1858–1860
- Sam Hurst 1860–1861
- Jem Mace 1861–1862
- Tom King (boxer) 1862–1863
- Joe Wormald 1865
- Jem Mace 1866–1871

== List of United States Heavyweight Bare-knuckle Boxing Champions ==
- Tom Molineaux 1810–1815
- Tom Hyer 1841–1851
- John Morrissey 1853–1859
- John Camel Heenan 1860–1863
- Joe Coburn 1863–1865
- Jimmy Elliott 1865–1870
- Mike McCoole 1870
- Tom Allen (boxer) 1870
- Jem Mace 1870–1871
- Tom Allen (boxer) 1873–1876
- Joe Goss 1876–1880
- Paddy Ryan 1880–1882
- John L. Sullivan 1882–1889

== See also ==
- Bare Knuckle Fighting Championship
- Bare Knuckle Boxing Hall of Fame
- BYB Extreme
- Bare Knuckle Fighting Championship United Kingdom
- Bare Knuckle Fighting Championship Thailand
- Chivarreto boxing
- List of bare-knuckle lightweight champions
- Lethwei
- London Prize Ring rules
- Russian boxing
- Rough and tumble fighting
- Savate

== Sources and further reading ==
- The Outsiders – Exposing the Secretive World of Ireland's Travellers Chapters 4 and 5 (ISBN 978-1-903582-67-1) by Eamon Dillon, published Nov 2006 by Merlin Publishing
- David Snowdon, Writing the Prizefight: Pierce Egan's Boxiana World (2013)
- Interview with bare knuckle boxer from the 1950s
