= Jem Ward =

English bare knuckle boxer and artist

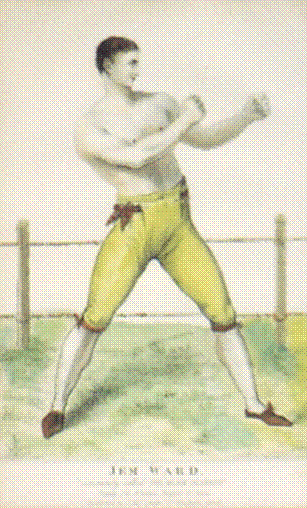
Jem Ward circa 1825

Jem Ward (26 December 1800 – 3 April 1884) was an English bare-knuckle boxer. "A fine fighter and powerfully built man", he was the English champion from 1825 until 1831. He became known as one of the first boxers to be sanctioned for deliberately losing a fight. During his fighting career he was nicknamed "The Black Diamond". In retirement he became a successful artist.

== Boxing career ==
Ward first became a professional boxer in 1815, at 15 years of age. He was 5 ft 11 inches (1.80 m) tall, and weighed 12 stone (76 kg). His first fight was victorious against George Robinson and never lost a match until he fought Bill Abbott in 1822. This was the controversial bout that wrecked Ward's early professional career. He was heard to call to his opponent "Now, Bill, look sharp, hit me and I’ll go down." He was promptly hit and fell to the ground. Abbott was considered to be Ward's inferior, and suspicions were immediately aroused. The Pugilistic Society, the body which then governed boxing and enforced the London Prize Ring rules, held an inquiry. Eventually after confessing he had received a £100 bribe to lose, Ward was banned from fighting in any contest governed by the Society. In this era boxing was an object of heavy betting by all strata, including the sons of King George III.

The incident left Ward's reputation with a lasting stigma and delayed his admission to the Boxing hall of Fame for 120 years after his death. Ward was the elder brother of the boxer Nick Ward, who had a reputation for using unfair tactics. Nick never matched his brother's success.

Deprived of his living, Ward was reduced to travelling the country fighting under assumed names at fairs or in any ungoverned brawl where he could possibly pick up a prize. In 1823 while attending a bout as a spectator, he was called upon to enter the ring when the planned fight ended prematurely and someone was needed to keep the crowd present and spending money. He fought and defeated Ned Baldwin, but the match was voided due to his ban. Later in 1823, the Pugilistic Society allowed him to reenter their fights.

After his reinstatement, he lost his first fight to Josh Hudson. In 1825, anxious for publicity and thus money, he challenged and fought the reigning champion Tom Cannon, drawing a crowd. Cannon was seconded by two previous champions Tom Spring and Tom Cribb. The match took place on 19 July 1825 at Stanfield Park on a hot day. It took Ward just over 10 minutes to dispatch Cannon and become the new English champion.

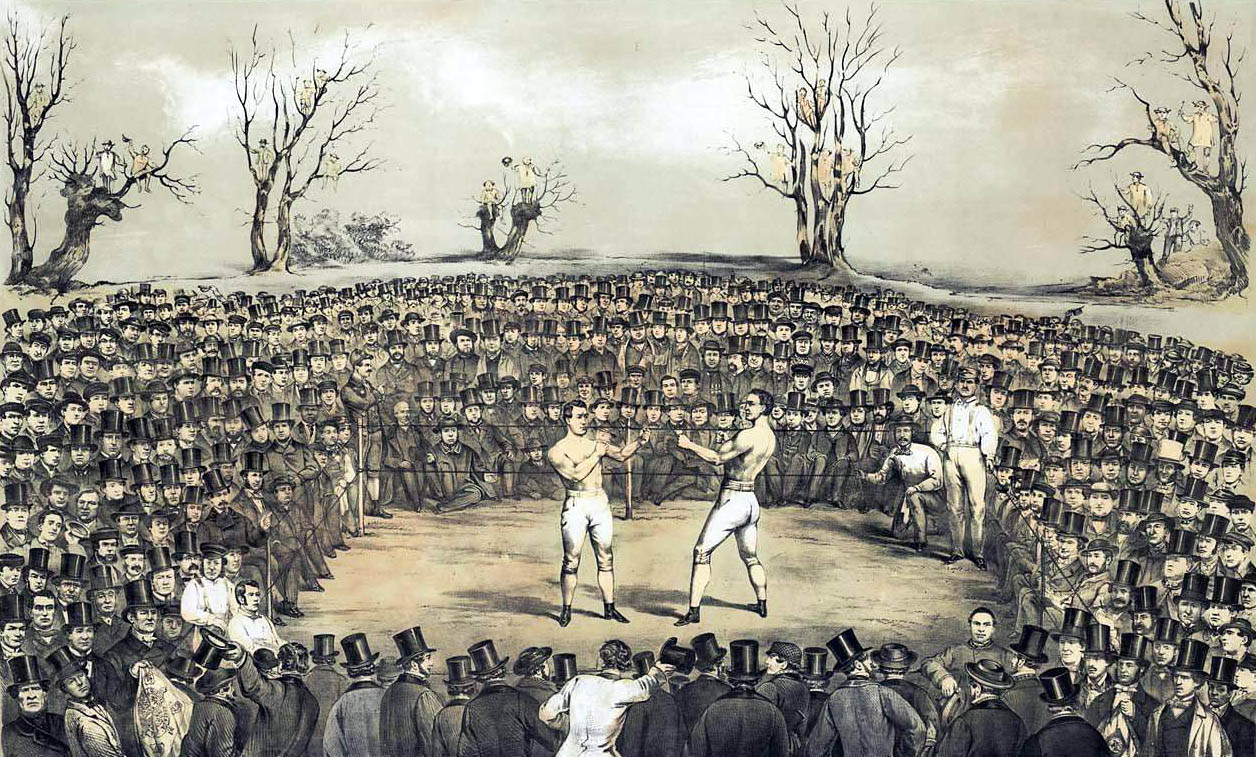
Painting by Jem Ward of the fight for the "Championship of England and America" between Thomas Sayers and John C. Heenan in 1860.

Following the victory Ward led a life of ease and dissipation for two years, having bought a public house. In 1827 he was forced by public opinion to return to the ring, and accept a challenge from Peter Crawley. He was defeated by Crawley, but quickly reclaimed the title when Crawley retired immediately after their match. Ward's last match was in 1831. On 12 July, he fought his last fight against the Irish champion, Simon Byrne. After an hour and seventeen minutes Ward was victorious, and retained his title until his retirement in 1831.

His 1831 retirement was forced. Ward had received criticism for refusing to face a younger challenger, James Burke, leading him to retire and relinquish his title to the victor of Burke's match against his last adversary Simon Byrne in 1833. Ward then refused to hand over the belt when Burke beat Byrne. Byrne had been knocked unconscious and died three days after the fight, Burke was tried and acquitted of his murder, but Ward still refused to part with the championship belt. He finally handed the belt over to William ‘Bendigo’ Thompson at the Queen’s Theatre in Liverpool following the latter's defeat of Burke in 1839.

== Retirement ==
In retirement he kept the "York Hotel" in Liverpool, where he was taught to paint by his friend, artist William Daniels. He became an accomplished and proficient artist exhibiting his work in London and Liverpool. He played both the violin and flute and sang in concerts. He taught the boxing arts to students, one of whom, Tom King, defeated the legendary Jem Mace to become champion in 1863. Ward died in 1884 at his home in London. He was elected to the International Boxing Hall of Fame in 1995. He is buried in Nunhead Cemetery, London.

== See also ==
- List of bare-knuckle boxers
