= Gilbert Odd =

Gilbert Odd (1902 – 12 May 1996) was a British boxing historian and sportswriter.

Odd boxed briefly as an amateur, then at 18 turned his sights on the sports writing side of the game, becoming a ringside correspondent for the weekly magazine, Boxing. Starting in 1941 and continuing for ten years after, he served as Editor in Chief of Boxing News, the successor to Boxing. In 1944, he began assisting in the publication of The Boxers Annual, which compiled the records of both professional and amateur boxers. In addition, he began the publication of a similar record book, the Boxing News Authors' and Record Book. Throughout the process of compiling and publishing these records, Odd became known as the best boxing historian in England.

Odd was a member of the British Boxing Board of Control from 1961 to 1969 and became a founding member of the Boxing Writers' Club. He also is the only journalist to be made an honorary member of the National Sporting Club. Odd was enshrined in the International Boxing Hall of Fame in 1995. He retired to Northiam, where he lived until his death in 1996.

== Bibliography ==
Odd has written literally hundreds of articles on boxing for various publications. In addition, he has published over a dozen books, among them:

- Ring Battles of the Century (1949) -- ASIN B0006DCTZA
- Was the Referee Right? (1952)
- Debatable Decisions (1953)
- Great moments in sport: heavyweight boxing—ISBN 978-0-7207-0695-6
- Boxing, the Great Champions (1974) -- ISBN 978-0-600-31302-1
- Great moments in sport: Boxing : cruisers to mighty atoms (1974) -- ISBN 978-0-7207-0775-5
- Ali—The Fighting Prophet (1975) -- ISBN 978-0-7207-0845-5
- The Fighting Blacksmith (1976) -- ISBN 978-0-7207-0927-8
- Boxing, the Inside Story (1978) -- ISBN 978-0-600-31458-5
- Lee Harvey, Prince of Boxers (1978) -- ISBN 978-0-7207-1026-7
- The Woman in the Corner (1978) -- ISBN 978-0-7207-1105-9
- Kings of the ring : 100 years of world heavyweight boxing (1985) -- ISBN 0-600-35899-2
- The Encyclopedia of Boxing (1989) -- ISBN 978-1-55521-395-4
