= Jack Bartholomew (boxer) =

English boxer (1763–1803)

Jack "Barty" Bartholomew, (1763–1803 (Note: Some sources report 1760)) was a bare-knuckle boxer born in Brentford, Middlesex, England.

== Personal life ==
Little is known about Bartholomew's life except that he was a market gardener. The primary sources for Bartholomew are Pierce Egan's 'Boxiana' and Henry Downes Miles 'Pugilistica'.

== Relevant fights ==
Bartholomew defeated Tom Owen on 22 August 1797. The bout lasted thirty minutes and took place at Moulsey Hurst, England.

Bartholomew drew his first fight with Jem Belcher in 40 minutes, but lost the second on 15 May 1800 at Finchley Common. The fight lasted twenty minutes. Belcher was later recognised as English Prizefighting Champion from 1800 to 1805.

== Boxing specifications and style ==
Bartholomew stood at 5'9.5" and weighed 13.5 stone. He was backed by Lord Camelford, captain of the Royal Navy. Bartholomew was described in Boxiana as 'a very hard hitter; extremely active and formidable in all his battles, and perfectly entitled to the appellation of a sound and complete boxer'.

== Death ==
Bartholomew died 14 July 1803, in Almonry, Westminster, England. He died of severe cirrhosis of the liver and was bed-ridden for the last few days of his life.
