= Thomas Owen (boxer) =

English boxer (1768–1843)

Tom Owen

Personal information
- Nickname: The "Fighting Oilman"
- Nationality: English
- Born: 21 December 1768 Portsea, Portsmouth, England
- Died: 13 December 1843 (aged 74) Plumstead, London, England
- Height: 5 ft 10 in (1.78 m)
- Weight: 168 lb (76 kg)

Boxing career
- Stance: Orthodox

Boxing record
- Total fights: 7 (estimated)
- Wins: 5 (estimated)
- Win by KO: 0
- Losses: 2
- Draws: 0
- No contests: 0

Tom Owen (21 December 1768 – 1843) was an English bare-knuckle boxer. He was born at Portsea, Portsmouth, Hampshire.

== Career ==
After several provincial bouts against local fighters Tom Owen moved to London and followed the occupation of an oil seller. While carrying a jar of oil through Haymarket he was ‘rudely assailed by a huge carman’ and a street fight resulted. This encounter was witnessed by a passing boxer, who was so impressed by Owen that he later introduced him to the reigning English champion John Jackson. This incident seems to have led to Owen’s involvement in the London prizefighting scene and he was soon matched against the established fighter Bill Hooper for stakes of 100 guineas a side (a significant sum for a prizefight during this period). This fight took place near Harrow on 14 November 1796 and was described in a contemporary report as follows: ‘The contest lasted rather more than an hour, during which the men fought fifty rounds of hard fighting, but for the most part of which Owen constantly kept a straight guard of such prodigious strength, that Hooper could never beat it down, and very seldom put in a hit. Hooper, in striking a blow, dislocated his shoulder, and being also dreadfully bruised, gave in. Owen was so little hurt, that he leisurely put on his clothes and walked away.’

The contemporary source Boxiana records a second fight against Hooper, taking place ten weeks later at the same location, which Owen won again “in equally good style“. The stakes were again recorded as 100 guineas, although Henry Downes Miles notes that this encounter goes unmentioned in the other contemporary sources. The details (result, location, stakes and ease of victory) seem to duplicate those of the earlier Owen-Hooper fight, so it is possible that this second fight was included in Boxiana in error.

Owen was next matched against Jack Bartholomew for 25 guineas-a-side. On 22 August 1797 Bartholomew emerged victorious at Moulsey Hurst, a frequent prizefighting location. The bout was described as “a truly desperate battle, and highly spoken of, at the time […], for the great courage displayed on both sides; and it was much in favour of Owen during one period of the fight […]; but owing to missing his aim from over-reaching himself, Owen, it seems, received so tremendous a hit from his adversary, that he lost the battle […].’.

On September 2, 1799, Tow Owen faced Houssa for 10 guineas-a-side at Enfield Racecourse. Owen was “so desperately beaten in this contest, after a struggle of forty minutes, that he was incapable of coming to the scratch in due time, leaving [Houssa] the conqueror”. (A round in prizefighting ended when a fighter was downed, he then had 30 seconds to return to the mark - or scratch - in the centre of the ring or he automatically lost the bout. This is the origin of the well-known phrase “coming up to scratch”.)

Owen then returned to winning ways in Deptford in December 1799, beating a 14-stone excavator called Davis in a fight lasting an hour. Owen is described as having “won it in fine style”.

== Later life ==
After retiring from prizefighting Owen worked frequently as a trainer and second, and in both pursuits he was very highly regarded. It was while working as a second that he ended up serving three months imprisonment in 1805 after being convicting of riot and conspiracy due to his involvement in the organisation of a prizefight on Putney Common.

In 1820, in his early 40s, Tom Owen returned to the ring to fight Daniel Mendoza (English Champion from 1792-5). Both men were well past their bests but agreed to fight to settle an old grudge, Mendoza hadn’t fought in 14 years and Owen hadn’t fought in 21. The fight took place at Banstead Downs, with Owen emerging victorious after 12 rounds. Mendoza acquitted himself rather poorly based on contemporary reports.

Owen is recorded as having worked for many years as a pub landlord, running two different pubs at different time (one in an area now occupied by St Katharine Docks, east London, and the other being the Shipwrights’ Arms in Northfleet). He was described by the leading boxing writer Pierce Egan as follows:

"Owen is of prepossessing appearance, and in height about five feet ten inches, weighting 12 stone. He is full of fun and anecdote; a good knowledge of life; of a cheerful disposition; sings a flash song with characteristic point and humour; and the company Tom spends an evening with will not have to complain that the time proved tedious or dull upon their hands. He is also well acquainted with the old school of boxers; and has given a public imitation of their various attitudes and modes of fighting with effect and success."

== Death ==
Tom Owen died in Plumstead in 1843 aged 75 years.
