= List of bare-knuckle boxers =

List of bare-knuckle boxers is an aggregate of articles pertaining to boxers that fought either all or part of their careers as bare-knuckle boxers.

== A ==
- (England) Barney Aaron
- (England) Don Adams
- (Republic of Ireland) James Ambrose

== B ==
- (England) Jem Belcher
- (England) Stuart Bennett
- (England) Isaac Bitton
- (United States) Andy Bowen
- (England) Benjamin Brain
- (England) Bill Brassey
- (United States) Bill Brennan
- (Scotland) Bob Brettle
- (England) Charles Bronson
- (England) Harry Broome
- (England) Johnny Broome
- (England) Jack Broughton
- (Australia) Lucas Browne
- (England) James Burke
- (United States) Charley Burley
- (Republic of Ireland) Simon Byrne

== C ==
- (England) Ben Caunt
- (England) Arthur Chambers
- (United States) Joe Choynski
- (Republic of Ireland) / (United States) John Clark
- (Republic of Ireland) / (United States) Mike Cleary
- (Republic of Ireland) / (United States) Joe Coburn
- (England) / (United States) Sam Collyer
- (United States) James J. Corbett
- (England) Tom Cribb
- (England) Dick Curtis

== D ==
- (Australia) George Dawson
- (Republic of Ireland) Dan Donnelly

== E ==
- (England) Billy Edwards

== F ==
- (United States) Mike Farragher
- (England) James Figg
- (England) Bob Fitzsimmons
- (United States) Dan "Porky" Flynn

== G ==
- (United States) Awful Gardner
- (Republic of Ireland) / (United States) George Gardner
- (Republic of Ireland) / (United States) Owney Geoghegan
- (Confederate States of America) / (United States) Harry Gilmor
- (Canada) George "Old Chocolate" Godfrey
- (Republic of Ireland) Bartley Gorman
- (England) / (United States) Joe Goss
- (England) Bob Gregson
- (England) John Gully
- (Canada) Bobby Gunn
- (England) Mark Godbeer

== H ==
- (Australia) Jim Hall
- (United States) John C. Heenan
- (United States) Jacob Hyer
- (United States) Tom Hyer

== J ==
- (England) John Jackson
- (Australia) Peter "Black Prince" Jackson
- (England) Paddington Tom Jones

== K ==
- (United States) Jake Kilrain
- (England) Thomas King

== L ==
- (England) Nat Langham
- (England) James Leak
- (United States) Chris Leben
- (United States) Jack Lester
- (Russia) Artem Lobov

== M ==
- (England) Jem Mace
- (United States) Billy Madden
- (Republic of Ireland) / (United States) Peter Maher
- (United States) Billy Martin
- (Republic of Ireland) / (United States) Jack McAuliffe
- (United States) Dominick McCaffrey
- (Republic of Ireland) / (United States) Mike McCoole
- (United States) Charles "Kid" McCoy
- (United States) Patrick "Paddy" McGuigan
- (Scotland) Alexander McKay
- (England) Victor McLaglen
- (England) Lenny "The Guv'nor" McLean
- (United States) Jack McManus
- (England) Daniel Mendoza
- (Australia) "Professor" William Miller
- (United States) Tom Molineaux
- (England) Johnny Moneghan
- (Republic of Ireland) / (United States) John Morrissey

== N ==
- (Republic of Ireland) John Joe Nevin
- (Scotland) Tommy Nevin

== O ==
- (England) John 'Coffee Johnny' Oliver

== P ==
- (England) Tom Paddock
- (England) Ned Painter
- (England) Henry Pearce
- (England) Isaac Perrins
- (England) William Perry
- (United States) William Poole

== R ==
- (England) Jack Randall
- (Australia) Bec Rawlings
- (England) Bill Richmond
- (Republic of Ireland) / (United States) Paddy Ryan
- (United States) Tommy Ryan

== S ==
- (England) Tom Sayers
- (Australia) Curtis Scott
- (Republic of Ireland) / (United States) Tom Sharkey
- (England) Roy "Pretty Boy" Shaw
- (United States) Viro Small
- (England) Jem Smith
- (England) Tom Spring
- (United States) John L. Sullivan
- (Republic of Ireland) / (United States) Yankee Sullivan
- (England) Owen Swift
- (Republic of Ireland) Jimmy Sweeney

== T ==
- (Republic of Ireland) / (United States) John Mahan
- (England) William Thompson

== W ==
- (England) Jonny Walker
- (England) Jem Ward
- (England) Nicholas Ward
- (United States) Harry Woodson

== See also ==
- List of bare-knuckle lightweight champions
