= List of bare-knuckle lightweight champions =

See also List of bare-knuckle boxers

This list of bare-knuckle lightweight champions is a chronological list from England and the United States. In some cases, the champions and their reigns can be disputed. The purpose of this list is to chronicle the evolution of the lightweight division.

Reign began	Reign ended	Champion	Recognition
ca. 1799	1804	(United Kingdom) Caleb Baldwin	England
1804	1810–retired	(United Kingdom) Dutch Sam	England
1810s	1810s–vacated	(United Kingdom) Jack Randall	England
1820s	1820s–vacated	(United Kingdom) Dick Curtis	England
1830s	1830s–vacated	(United Kingdom) “Young” Dutch Sam	England
ca. 1838	1841	(United Kingdom) Jack Hannan	England
1841	1842–retired	(United Kingdom) Johnny Broome	England
1842	?	(United Kingdom) Jonny Walker	England
1850s	?	(United Kingdom) Bob Travers	England
1855	1856	(United Kingdom) Johnny Moneghan	USA
1856	1856–vacated	(United States) James Hart	USA
1856	1857	(United Kingdom) Johnny Moneghan	USA
1857	1858	(United Kingdom) Barney Aaron	USA
1858	ca. 1861–retired	(United States) Patrick “Scotty” Brannigan	USA
1861	1863–retired	(Republic of Ireland) Owney Geoghegan	USA
1866	1867	(France) Sam Collyer	USA
1867	1867–retired	(United Kingdom) Barney Aaron	USA
1868–claimed title	?–vacated	(United States) Abe Hicken	USA
1867–claimed title	1868	(France) Sam Collyer	USA
1868	1872	(United Kingdom) Billy Edwards	USA
1872	1879–retired	(United Kingdom) Arthur Chambers	USA
1880s–claimed title	?	(United States) Charley Norton	USA
1880s–claimed title	ca. 1885–moved up in weight	(Republic of Ireland) "Nonpareil" Jack Dempsey	USA
1885	1892–retired	(Republic of Ireland) Jack McAuliffe, last bare-knuckle champion/first gloved champion	USA

== See also ==
- List of bare-knuckle boxers
