= Robert Gregson =

Robert Gregson may refer to:

- Robert Gregson (filmmaker), American filmmaker
- Bob Gregson (1778–1824), British bare-knuckle fighter
