= Awful =

Awful may refer to:

- "Awful" (song), a 1999 single by the band Hole
- Awful Orphan, a 1949 cartoon
- Awful Gardner, a notorious gambler
- Awful End, a 2002 children's novel
- "Awful, Beautiful Life", a song by Darryl Worley
- Awful Mess Mystery, a Wolfie album
- The Awful DYNNE, a character from The Phantom Tollbooth
- The Awful Truth, a 1937 comedy
- Mount Awful, a mountain in New Zealand
- Something Awful, a comedy website

== See also ==
- The Awful Truth (disambiguation)
