= Crazy Lou =

Pseudonymous New York showgirl and prostitute

Crazy Lou (died 1886) was the pseudonym of a New York showgirl and prostitute who was a well-known personality in the Bowery during the late 19th century. Described as a "famous local harlot derived from Boston society"', little of her life is known before her arrival in New York. She is said to have been the daughter of a wealthy Boston merchant who, at the age of 17, was seduced by a young man and traveled to New York to join him. She instead fell into the hands of procuresses who sold her to one of the Seven Sisters brothels, a group of seven well-known establishments located in a residential area of brownstones on West 25th Street. Forced into prostitution, she was eventually released "when her beauty faded".

Remaining in New York, she frequented the Haymarket and the Cremorne and eventually became a popular dance hall girl. She regularly performed at some of the top bars and social clubs in the city including establishments owned by Tom Gould, Harry Hill and Billy McGlory. She spent her last years at Frank Stephenson's Black and Tan Club where, even after retirement, she remained a regular, typically staying from midnight until 2:00 am. As she grew older, she became destitute and reportedly "lived on scrappings from garbage pails" and made her living begging or selling flowers on the street. Yet she continued going to the Black and Tan, where she had a regular table and was personally served a tumbler of whiskey by Stephenson free of charge. One night in 1886, the elderly woman did not show up at the bar, and the next morning, her body was found floating in the East River. Her mysterious death was never solved; however, Stephenson continued to set a glass of whiskey at her usual table for a month after her death and allowed no one to sit at the table until 2:00 am.
