= 1808 in sports =

1808 in sports describes the year's events in world sport.

== Boxing ==
Events

- 10 May — John Gully successfully defends his English title by defeating Bob Gregson in 24 rounds at Woburn. Gully announces his retirement later in the year.
- 8 October — Tom Cribb defeats Bob Gregson in 23 rounds at Moulsey Hurst to win the English championship following John Gully's retirement.

== Cricket ==
Events

- George Osbaldeston makes his debut in first-class cricket.

England

- Most runs – Lord Frederick Beauclerk 379 (HS 100)
- Most wickets – Thomas Howard and Lord Frederick Beauclerk 16 apiece

== Horse racing ==
England

- The Derby – Pan
- The Oaks – Morel
- St Leger Stakes – Petronius
