= Sam Collyer =

United States Army Medal of Honor recipient, boxer

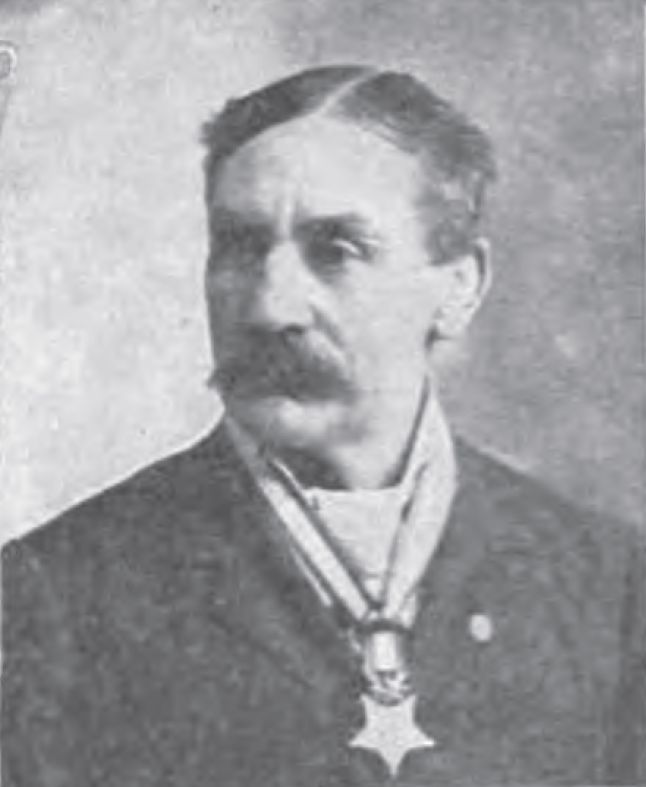
- Walter Jamieson wearing his Medal of Honor
- Born: Walter Jamieson; May 14, 1842; Boulogne, France
- Died: December 7, 1904 (aged 62); Brooklyn, New York
- Military career
- Allegiance: United States of America; Union
- Branch: Union Army
- Service years: 1861 - 1865
- Rank: Lieutenant
- Units: The 28th Regiment, New York State Militia; 139th New York Volunteer Infantry Regiment
- Conflicts: American Civil War: Siege of Petersburg; Battle of Chaffin's Farm
- Awards: Medal of Honor

Sam Collyer (born Walter Jamieson; May 14, 1842 – December 7, 1904) was a bare-knuckle boxer, and the American Lightweight Champion. He was the son of James Jamieson and Jane Taylor of Angus, Scotland. He weighed between 115 and 125 pounds, and stood 5 feet 5 ½ inches. Born in France, he came to the United States as a boy. He received the United States Medal of Honor in 1898, for his actions in 1864 in the American Civil War.

== Early life ==
Collyer was born May 14, 1842, in Boulogne, France, as Walter Jamieson. He came to the United States as a boy. He joined the Army from Brooklyn in September 1862. He received the Medal of Honor for his actions in the Siege of Petersburg. He left the army with the rank of Lieutenant in June 1865.

== Boxing career ==
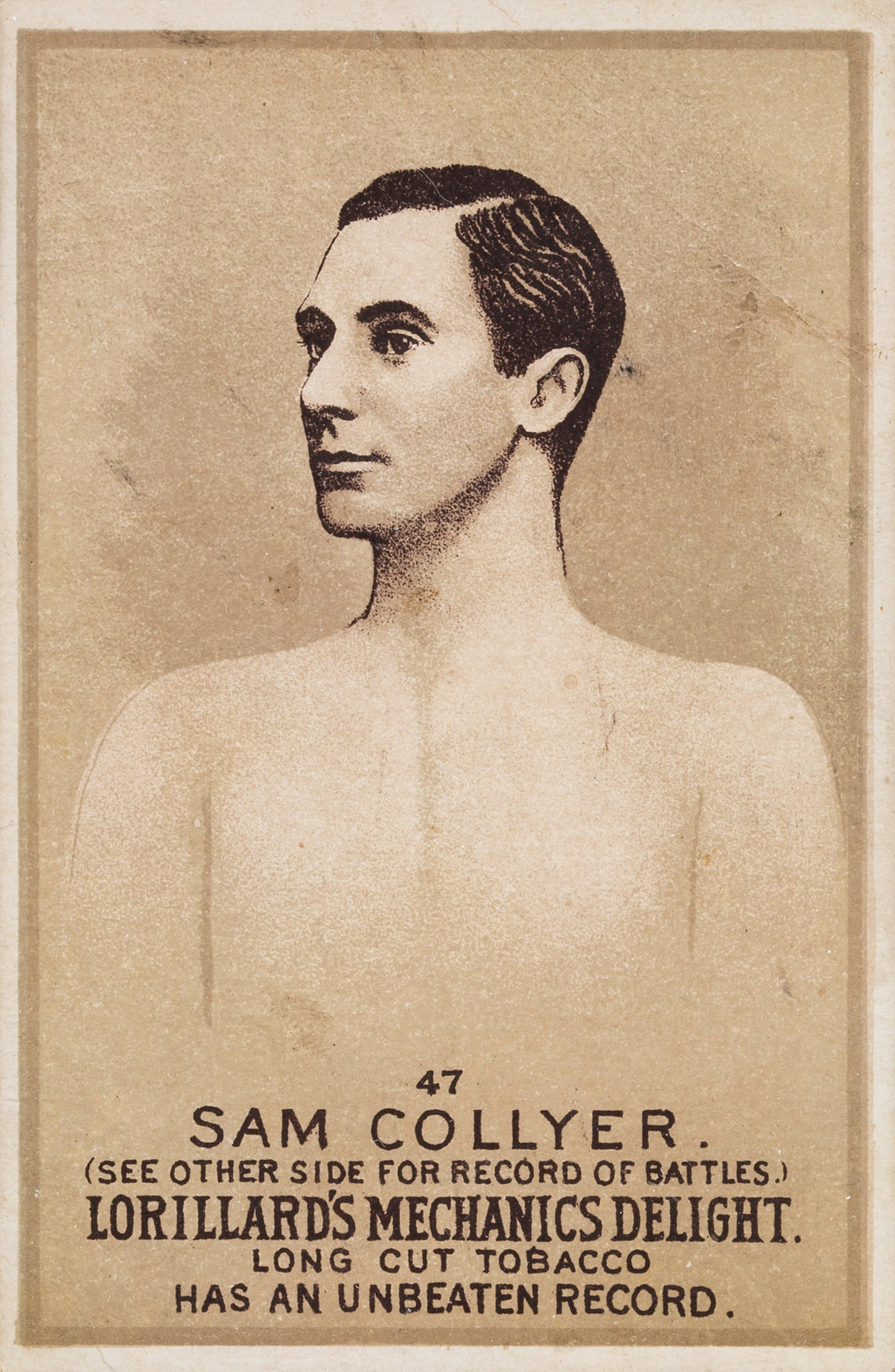
1887 Trading card of Sam Collyer, made by Lorillard Tobacco

The earliest contests of Sam Collyer differ from source to source. Some list different dates, locations and people for these bouts. It is certain however, that Collyer did battle, and defeat a man named Mike Carr in early 1866 . The first significant contest of Collyer's career was his bout with Horatio "Race" Bolster. The two met in Alexandria, VA on May 8, 1866. During the contest, Bolster broke his hand, and was given a tremendous beating. The fight ended after 49 rounds and 55 minutes. Collyer ended the contest when he knocked his opponent off his feet, and Bolster's seconds threw in the towel.

=== Taking the American Lightweight Championship, June 1866 ===
Later that year, Collyer battled former champion Young Barney Aaron for the vacant Lightweight Championship of America. The Title had been vacated since the retirement of Owney Geoghegan back in 1863. The Aaron/Collyer contest was held on June 20, 1866, at Pohick Landing, VA. The fierce battle was contested for 47 rounds taking 2 hours and 14 minutes before Collyer was declared the winner. Below is an account of the last few rounds of the Collyer/Aaron fight as written in the New York Herald on June 21, 1866:

Rounds 41 to 44—These rounds were merely repetitions of each other, Barney constantly going down on his knees, apparently for the purpose of receiving a foul blow and thereby winning the stakes. At the close of

Round 47—He was entirely blind, and his seconds seeing that there was no possible chance of success and unwilling to subject a game man to further punishment threw up the sponge in token of defeat.

On September 7, 1866, Collyer defended his title against Johnny Lafferty in a contest that lasted 39 rounds and 62 minutes (some sources report 60 minutes). His second defense came against Johnny McGlade at Goldsboro, PA on January 15, 1867. McGlade had suffered a severe fever while training, and was completely dominated during the contest. The two battle for 47 rounds and 55 minutes in the sleet covered ring before McGlade's corner threw in the towel.

=== Losing and reclaiming the American Lightweight Championship, June 1867 ===
Collyer lost his title in a rematch with Young Barney Aaron on June 13, 1867. The two contested in a hard-fought battle for 68 rounds and 1 hour and 55 minutes at Aquia Creek in Northern Virginia. The fight began at 8:50 am, with around 1500 in attendance and was fought outdoors in an Amphitheater on the banks of Aquia Creek in Northern Virginia. Young Barney won the choice of position and wisely took the side of the ring not facing the sun. By the end of the bout, Collyer's eyes were closed causing his seconds to throw in the sponge. The bare-knuckled boxing was desperate and brutal and both boxers were down in various rounds. Immediately after winning the title, Young Barney Aaron took a long leave from the ring, leaving the crown open for Collyer to reclaim. His bouts with Collyer were considered among his most memorable and significant.

The first man to challenge his right to the title was Billy Kelly. Kelly was a gifted pugilist, and word of the battle quickly spread. The Collyer/Kelly contest was held on November 27, 1867, in Strickland, PA. Collyer pressed the fight from start to finish, and his opponent was forced into the defensive mode for nearly the entire bout. A total of 111 short rounds and 1 hour and fifty minutes were fought before the champion knocked his opponent down for the final time.

Below is an account of the last three rounds (and conclusion) of the contest. They were documented in the New York Herald the day after the contest:

Round 109—Collyer, determined to close fight before dark, rushed in [? ?] Kelly and struck him a right-hander over the left [?], then gave him the left on the nose, and again the right on the mouth, when Kelly went down.

Round 110—Collyer led off with his left, which brought upon Kelly's nose, and then, putting in two heavy right-handers clinched, Kelly and threw him, falling heavily on him.

Round 111 and Last—Collyer rushed at Kelly and hitting a heavy right-hander in the mouth knocked him down.

The sponge was thrown up in token of defeat and Sam Collyer hailed the victor. Kelly, the game fellow, was much mortified at the result and shed tears. Collyer went over to him and putting his arms around him, also burst into tears. He then went around among the crowd and collected money for the man he had beaten in a fair fight for the championship of the lightweights of America.

=== Rivalry with Billy Edwards ===
1893 color lithograph of Sam Collyer and Billy Edwards, made by Lorillard Tobacco

On August 24, 1868, Collyer lost his American Lightweight Title to Billy Edwards in 47 rounds. Their second fight was on March 2, 1870, on Mystic Island CT, near Long Island, NY. The American Lightweight Title was again decided in this fight, this time with Collyer throwing in the sponge in 40 rounds.

Edwards accepted a third challenge from Collyer in July 1870. Collyer sent the final installment for the stakes by courier, however they did not reach the stakeholder before the agreed time, thus forfeiting the match to Edwards. Collyer claimed he sent the payment on time and it was the courier's fault for late delivery of the payment, and sued to get his money back, damaging his reputation as a prize fighter.

The rivalry between Collyer and Edwards continued to spill out of the ring. In March 1871, Collyer challenged Edwards to a fight on the spot in Harry Hill's Saloon in New York. Tensions rose and Edwards drew a pistol in Collyer's face, and Collyer responded by punching Edwards. The fight escalated with Collyer taking more of the beating.

Their third and final contest came on August 8, 1874, in Mill Creek, WV. In the 10th round, Collyer landed a square uppercut that knocked Edwards on his back, ending the round. The 11th came and Edwards appeared winded and was slow to come to the line. As he did, Collyer's seconds noticed something in Edwards hands, and the referee called for him to open them. In the New York Clipper's article from 22 August 1874, covering the fight it said:

"...Barney Aaron called on him to open his hands. He obeyed, when a white paste was found to be on them, and a tuft of grass in his right. It was a sticky substance intended to keep the fists closed. Sam's seconds and umpire instantly claimed foul for him. Billy's mawleys were wiped with a sponge, but it failed to clean them entirely. There was of course great confusion, one or two parties yelling themselves hoarse, under the impression, probably that justice was deaf. After some hesitation the referee ordered the fight to proceed. Billy then advanced to the scratch, but Sam's seconds would not allow him to do so. Roach, the umpire for Edwards, then vociferously claimed the fight for his man. The referee seemed nonplussed, and finally ended the difficulty and the fight by announcing that he would reserve his decision."

Five days later, on August 13, 1874, the referee Charles Carroll publicized his decision, declaring Edwards the winner, effectively making an unsatisfactory ending to Collyer and Edwards' six-year rivalry.

=== Death of Billy Walker and Prison Time ===
Sam Collyer was the trainer for, and seconded Billy Walker in a prize fight verses Jimmy Weedon on August 31, 1876, in Pennsville, NJ. In round 76, Weedon knocked out Walker, who did not get back up. Collyer threw up the sponge to end the fight. Walker would die later that night from his injuries. Weedon, Collyer and a number of other men involved in the fight were arrested, tried and convicted. Collyer, Weedon and the others were sentenced to six years in prison for manslaughter. Weedon died a year later in prison. Collyer was pardoned and released two years later.

=== Later career ===
Collyer continued to fight in small bouts after being released from prison. In 1888, Collyer heard that the current Lightweight Champion Jack McAuliffe had claimed he could knock out the veteran Collyer in two rounds. The 46-year old Collyer then challenged the 22-year old McAuliffe to a gloved fight of six rounds. The fight took place on December 16, 1888, in New York City. Collyer lost in two rounds in three minutes. Afterward, the Governor of New Jersey, Collyer's former Civil War commander the General George B. McClellan summoned for Collyer and made him take an oath to forever leave the prize-ring.

== Later life ==
After retirement Collyer began working as a machinist in the Brooklyn Navy Yard, and remained there until his death on December 7, 1904. During his life he raised the teenage sons of his late brother, Henry Jamieson, and performed with the boys in Barnum and Bailey show.

== Medal of Honor citation ==
Rank and organization: 1st Sergeant, Company B, 139th New York Infantry. Place and date: At Petersburg, Va., 30 July 1864; At Fort Harrison, Va., 29 September 1864. Entered service at: New York, N.Y. Birth: France. Date of issue: 5 April 1898.

Citation:

Voluntarily went between the lines under a heavy fire at Petersburg, Va., to the assistance of a wounded and helpless officer, whom he carried within the Union lines. At Fort Harrison, Va., seized the regimental color, the color bearer and guard having been shot down, and, rushing forward, planted it upon the fort in full view of the entire brigade.

== Legacy ==
Collyer was elected into the Boxing Hall of Fame in 1964.

== Partial List of Fights ==
Date	Result	Opponent	Round	Time	Purse	Location	Notes
Mar 16, 1866	Won	Mike Carr	14	24 minutes	$200	near Rock Creek, MD	First known professional fight
Apr, 1866		Jim Kerrigan	**	**	$1000	not chosen	Kerrigan side forfeits after financial backers back out
May 7, 1866	Won	Horatio "Race" Bolster	49	55 minutes	$600	near White House, VA	Fight was spur of the moment
Jun 20, 1866	Won	"Young" Barney Aaron	47	2 hours, 5 minutes	$2000	near Pohick, VA	American Lightweight Title fight; both fighters carried off on stretches, and arrested by police.
Jan 15, 1867	Won	Johnny McGlade	47	55 minutes	$2000	near Goldsboro, PA	American Lightweight Title fight
Jun 13, 1867	Lost	"Young" Barney Aaron	68	1 hour, 55 minutes	$1000	near Aquia Creek, VA	American Lightweight Title fight; Barney Aaron retires soon after passing the Title back to Collyer
Nov 27, 1867	Won	Billy Kelly	111	1 hour, 50 minutes	$2000	near Strickland, PA	American Lightweight Title fight
Aug 24, 1868	Lost	Billy Edwards	47	1 hour, 14 minutes	$2000	Traverse Island, Coan River, VA	American Lightweight Title fight
Oct 5, 1869		Charley Doherty	**	**	$2000	Jamestown Island, Smith River, VA	American Lightweight Title fight; Doherty overweight on weigh-in, forfeits to Collyer
Mar 2, 1870	Lost	Billy Edwards	40	47 minutes	$2000	Mystic Island, CT	American Lightweight Title fight
Jul 19, 1870	Won	Johnny Lafferty	21	14 minutes	$600	3 miles south of Quindaro, MO	
Sep 27, 1870		Billy Edwards	**	**	$1600	within 50 miles of St. Louis, MO	American Lightweight Title fight; Collyer's side forfeits because final deposit not received in time from courier. Edwards keeps Title. Collyer sues to get money back.
Nov 23, 1872	Won	Patsy McGuire	7	20 minutes	$400	2 miles from Little Rock, AR	Foul by McGuire; Collyer declared winner
Aug 8, 1874	Lost	Billy Edwards	11	24 minutes	$2000	Mill Creek, WV	Collyer's side claimed foul, refused to keep fighting. Referee declares Edwards winner.

== See also ==
- List of Medal of Honor recipients
- List of Bare-knuckle Lightweight Champions
- List of bare-knuckle boxers
