= Billy McGlory =

American saloon keeper

Billy McGlory (McGrory)
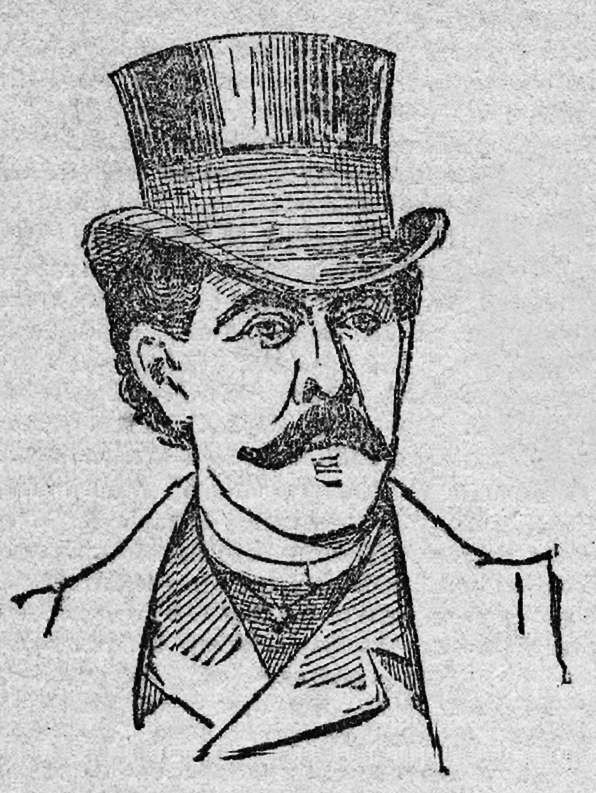
- McGlory in 1884
- Born: William McGlory; 1851; New York City, New York
- Died: 1927 (aged 75–76)
- Other names: Billy McGrory
- Occupation: Saloon keeper
- Known for: New York saloon keeper and underworld figure during the mid-to late 19th century; owner of the infamous Bowery resort McGlory's Armory Hall.

William McGlory (born McGrory; 1850–1927) was an American saloon keeper and underworld figure in New York City during the mid-to late 19th century. He was well known in The Bowery and Five Points districts, owning a number of popular establishments throughout the city, most notably McGlory's Armory Hall, a popular Bowery hangout for members of the underworld in the old Fourth and Sixth Wards.

== Early life and criminal career ==
Reports of Billy McGlory's early life differ. Popular legend has it that he was born in the slums of the Five Points and grew up in an atmosphere of vice and crime, prior to the reform efforts of Reverend Lewis Pease and the Five Points House of Industry during the mid-1850s. Contemporary reports says he was born and raised in the Sixteenth Ward (bounded by West 14th Street, the Hudson River, West 26th Street and Sixth Avenue), specifically on 16th Street between 6th and Seventh Avenues, by respectable Irish parents. Billy's half-brother by his mother's first marriage, Johnny Thompson, was a well-known Bowery actor. It is likely that as a young man he was a member of both the Forty Thieves and the Chichesters. Former New York City Chief of Police George W. Walling described him in his memoirs as "a man out of whom forty devils might be cast were it possible to get at him". One of the first saloons he ever opened, known as the Burnt Rag, was located in the basement of 50 Bleecker Street. Only 200 feet away from police headquarters, the so-called "notorious thieves' den" was subject to frequent police raids. In 1878, he operated Eagle Hall, also known as the Burnt Rag at 6 Rivington Street. By September 1878, he was running another drinking place known as Burnt Rag No. 2, or the Windsor Palace, out of 103 Bowery, formerly occupied by Owen Geoghegan. Geoghegan relocated his saloon to 105 Bowery that same year.

== Armory Hall ==
McGlory opened McGlory's Armory Hall, located at 158 Hester Street, in the late 1870s. It was described by a journalist for the Cincinnati Enquirer as having "a beastliness and depravity ... compared with which no chapter in the world's history is equal". It very quickly became a popular underworld resort, frequented by thieves, pickpockets, and procurers throughout the old Fourth and Sixth Wards for nearly two decades. Armory Hall was often the scene of barroom brawls and gang violence. Drunken customers were robbed, many times by the female regulars who flirted with the victim beforehand, and then dragged from a table by a bouncer and thrown out into the street. Once outside, the victim would be searched by for anything of value and was usually stripped of his clothes.

Many of the bouncers of McGlory's Armory Hall were well-known criminals and hired thugs of the Five Points and the New York waterfront. These men were described as "some of the most expert rough-and-tumble fighters of the period" and could be seen walking the club freely wearing pistols, knives, brass knuckles, and bludgeons which they often used against unruly or otherwise uncooperative customers.

Armory Hall was entered from the street through a double doorway, which led into a long, narrow passageway with its walls painted "dead black". Fifty feet down the unlighted passage was the barroom and from there the main dance hall, furnished with chairs and tables, which accommodated up to 700 people. The music played in the dance hall included a piano, a cornet and a violin. A balcony ran around two sides of the hall with small box seats, some containing secret compartments, separated by heavy curtains reserved for wealthy patrons. These were usually out-of-towners who were known as big spenders in the city's many resorts and clubs. Private exhibitions were held in these boxes "even more degraded then the Haymarket" and McGlory, as an added attraction, employed half a dozen young males as waitresses "dressed in feminine clothing and circulated through the crowd, singing and dancing". They were "painted like women" and spoke in high, falsetto voices. As well as the many prostitutes and "serving girls" working in the dance hall, the concert saloon was widely known for encouraging homosexual activity among its patrons. McGlory also held athletic events at Armory Hall and charged 15 cents to attend these promotions. In 1883, his Grand Scarlet Ball included a cakewalk, mixed boxing matches, a beauty contest and a masquerade ball.

In January 1879, McGlory was indicted for running a disorderly house. When he failed to show up in court the following month, his US$500 (equivalent to $17,277 in 2025) bail was forfeited but no further action was taken. It was the robbery of a contractor, Bernard Lee, and others that prompted District Attorney John McKeon to search for untried indictments against McGlory. He found three and took them to Recorder Frederick Smythe who then ordered McGlory to appear before the General Sessions court. Though McGlory's lawyer requested bail be set at $500, McKeon raised an objection which was supported by Recorder Smythe and raised to $1,000. As a result of this trial, McGlory spent time in The Tombs and thereafter in the penitentiary on Blackwell's Island. He was freed August 13, 1884. During the time of his trial and subsequent imprisonment, McGlory became a member of The Salvation Army and claimed to support the Temperance movement. Upon release from prison he said that he would not take up the temperance cause as he was an "awful example",

== Hall closure and legal trouble ==
McGlory gained considerable notoriety from the press, especially from the New York Herald, who titled him the "Vicar General". He was one of several prominent figures, along with police officials, politicians, and sportsmen, who attended the bare-knuckle boxing prize fight between John L. Sullivan and Paddy Ryan at Madison Square Garden on January 19, 1885.

Upon the election, reform Mayor Abram S. Hewitt, who promised to clean up the vice and red light districts in New York City, closed many of the famous resorts, including Harry Hill's, Frank Stephenson's Black and Tan, Theodore Allen's American Mabille and, in lower Manhattan, The Haymarket. Authorities finally attempted to close Armory Hall in 1889, although their efforts were initially met with some difficulty. In a meeting with Mayor Hugh J. Grant in February, McGlory claimed that he had been trying to rent the building out as a church but had been unable to find tenants. A month later, police visited Armory Hall and reported they had witnessed nothing obscene or improper, "not even a cancan". He sold the building to a furniture manufacturer soon after, auctioning off the bar, piano, icebox, and stage scenery in June 1889.

A year later, McGlory bought the Hotel Irving, a respectable restaurant and boarding house in uptown Manhattan, and turned it into an all-night saloon and dance hall. The Hotel Irving was located on the corner of Fourteenth Street and Irving Place, across the street from the New York Academy of Music and nearby Tammany Hall and Tony Pastor's place. Complaints were made about the noise and violence but police did not take action until an exposé by the New York Herald prompted city officials to take action. The hotel's liquor license was revoked in June but McGlory continued to sell alcohol even after his bartender, Edward Kelly, was arrested. District Attorney De Lancey Nicoll ordered McGlory's arrest and, in December 1891, he stood trial at the Court of General Sessions for running a disorderly house.

At the trial, the Irving's manager Frederick Krause appeared as the state's witness and described how McGlory "muscled" his way into running the Irving despite his having no financial ties to it. Edward Corey, the former owner of the Haymarket, had legitimately purchased an interest in the hotel but was chased out by McGlory who threatened his life if he ever returned. In another incident, according to Krause, he himself was assaulted by McGlory when the hotel manager attempted to stop a suspicious looking couple from using one of the rooms. Other charges, aside from liquor law violations, were claimed by prostitute Nellie Martin, bookmaker Samuel Guggenheim, as well as additional witnesses who testified to other serious allegations.

From 1896 to 1899, McGlory operated a seedy resort at what is now the Elmwood Park in Syracuse, New York, but was driven away by relentless opposition from locals.

== Final years ==
Although McGlory's and a few other uptown resorts reopened in the aftermath of Mayor Hewitt's closures, none were able to regain their former prestige, and McGlory finally closed his last dance house in 1900. After aiding his wife Annie in a hearing by the New York Supreme Court, McGlory told reporters that he intended to leave New York and move out West.

McGlory was arrested once more on the night of May 30, 1903, and charged with running a saloon called the Emerald on Third Avenue in the Bronx without a liquor license. He was tried at the Morrisania Court two days later and explained to Judge Mayo that he had applied for a hotel license instead of a regular liquor license and hadn't intended to violate the law. The arresting detectives told the court they had arrested him because the brewery had taken away the establishment's license. Bail was set at $500 (equivalent to $17,917 in 2025) but McGlory was unable to pay it and he was taken to Harlem Prison to await trial. He met a young man while in prison, Warren Adams, who was being held for public drunkenness. Adams had traveled from Boston to attend a funeral and was arrested after he'd had a few too many drinks. Judge Mayo had sentenced him to prison in default of a $3 (equivalent to $107.5 in 2025) fine that Adams was unable to pay being only a dollar short. McGlory offered to pay the spare dollar. When Adams promised to mail him back the money from Boston, McGlory replied: "Well, if you do it will be the first dollar that ever came back to me."

The Oregon Daily Journal reported in 1912 that McGlory was "passing into a peaceful old age in a little cottage on the banks of the [East] river". He was threatened with expulsion from his home at East 125th Street by his landlord, the Pennsylvania Railroad Company, who wanted to build a dock there. It is unknown when Billy McGlory died; he was possibly the William J. McGrory that died at age 70 in the Bronx on December 26, 1928. At least one writer thought he was dead before 1917 and a newspaper from 1929 refers to him as the "late Billy McGlory".
