= Frank Stephenson (saloon keeper) =

- Occupation: Saloon keeper
- Known for: New York saloon keeper and underworld figure during the mid-to late 19th century; owner of the popular Bowery basement bar, The Black and Tan.

Frank Stephenson (fl. 1860 – 1885) was an American saloon keeper and underworld figure in New York City during the mid-to late 19th century. He was the owner of The Black and Tan, a popular Bowery basement bar located on Bleecker Street. It was one of the first saloons to cater to African Americans and was a competitor against neighboring establishments such as Harry Hill's gambling resort and Billy McGlory's Armory Hall among others. He is also credited for opening the city's first and oldest "undisguised" gay bar, The Slide, also on Bleecker Street.

Stephenson was described by Herbert Asbury in The Gangs of New York (1928) as "a tall, slim man with a curiously bloodless face. Contemporary writers marked his resemblance to a corpse; his face was almost as white as snow and his cheeks were sunken, while his eyebrows and hair were black as ink. His eyes were deep set, and very keen and piercing. It was his custom to sit bolt upright in a high chair in the center of his resort, and remain there for hours without displaying any other sign of life than the baleful glitter of his eyes."

While his establishment was popular among African Americans, the Black and Tan was frequented almost exclusively by white women who appeared "to have been quite abandoned". It has been speculated that the establishment served as a meeting place for interracial matchmaking and its clientele including Native Americans, East Indians, Chinese, Malaysians and Lascars. News reports of the time, however, reported "that non-whites were just as likely to be cold-cocked and fleeced as visiting farmers from upstate". Four bartenders served drinks over a long counter, and behind each was a long dirk and bludgeon which often used against unruly customers. In the hours before closing, much like other resorts of the era, were "enlivened with the cancan and licentious displays". Crazy Lou, a former dance hall girl and Bowery character, was a regular customer and had a reserved seat. She would continue to visit the bar, staying from midnight to 2:00 am, until her mysterious murder. Stephenson continued to set a glass of whiskey on her table for a month after her death and would not permit anyone to sit there until after 2:00 am.

The resort was closed, along with many others, by then newly elected reform Mayor Abram S. Hewitt who campaigned against the city's vice and red light districts. There is some discrepancy over the date of The Black and Tans closure. Former NYPD police chief George W. Walling claimed in his memoirs Recollections of a New York Chief of Police (1887) that it was closed in 1887, however an article by The New York Times, which reported the club's close as a "disorderly house" in July 1885, attributed the ownership to a Patrick Mee.

== In popular culture ==
Frank Stephenson and The Black and Tan appear in the historical novels The Alienist (1995) by Caleb Carr and The Midnight Band of Mercy (2004) by Michael Blaine.
