= Viro Small =

American professional wrestler and boxer

Viro Small

Viro Small (born c. 1854) was a collar-and-elbow wrestler and boxer of African descent who was active in the late 19th century. He is notable for being one of the first professionals of African descent in these fields in the United States.

Viro Small was born into slavery in Buford, South Carolina in 1854. He gained his freedom at the end of the American Civil War and moved north.

== Career ==
Viro Small's career as a boxer began in 1870. There is debate over whether his wrestling career started at this point or later in 1881. The match in 1881 was a collar-and-elbow match against Mike Horogan as a substitute for another wrestler. While he lost, Horogan was very impressed with Small's ability and agreed to train him.

Viro Small's career began to take off after this. Wrestling under the name Black Sam, out of St. Albans and Rutland, Vermont, Small won 63 matches between 1882 and 1892 and the Vermont Collar and Elbow Championship twice. These wins made him possibly the first champion of African descent in the United States, but there are conflicting accounts and competing claims to this distinction.

These titles also gave Small the chance to travel in the county fair circuits in New England. At the fairs, Small and Horogan would team up for various shows. Horogan would challenge members of the audience to get into the ring with Small and the volunteer could win money if he lasted a certain amount of time in the ring.

Small moved to New York City and wrestled in some of the toughest parts of the city, including at a tavern named Bastille of the Bowery, owned by former boxer Owney Geoghegan. The bar contained two rings for boxing and wrestling contests, and was notorious for crooked management, rowdy patrons and an overall seedy atmosphere. Geoghegan reportedly won a decision over an opponent in the Bowery by having his henchmen aim a gun at the referee's head after the fight.

On September 3, 1882, at Bowery, Small had a match with Billy McCallum that ended in a no-contest after a major argument started between them. Upset by the fight, McCallum attempted to murder Small later that evening while he was sleeping, shooting Small in the neck, but Small survived. Other frequent opponents in New York included Captain James C. Daley, Harry Woodson, and Joe Ryan.

Small's last recorded match took place in 1885.

== Championships and accomplishments ==
- Vermont Collar and Elbow Championship (2 times)

== Representation in Media ==
A documentary Black Sam's Statue on Viro Small's life was made by Elliott Marquis and released in February 2015.

== See also ==
- List of bare-knuckle boxers
