= Young Barney Aaron =

English boxer (1836–1907)

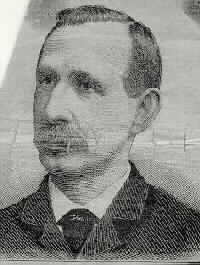
Abraham "Young Barney" Aaron in his later days as a referee, c. 1890 – 1900.

Young Barney Aaron (June 27, 1836, in Aldgate, London, England – June 4, 1907, in Long Island, New York) was a bare-knuckle boxer.

The son of Hall of Fame boxer Barney Aaron, he emigrated to the United States around 1853, and began boxing in 1856. Aaron first became a U.S. Lightweight Champion in 1857 defeating Jim Moneghan, and retook the title in 1867 against Sam Collyer.

== Boxing career ==
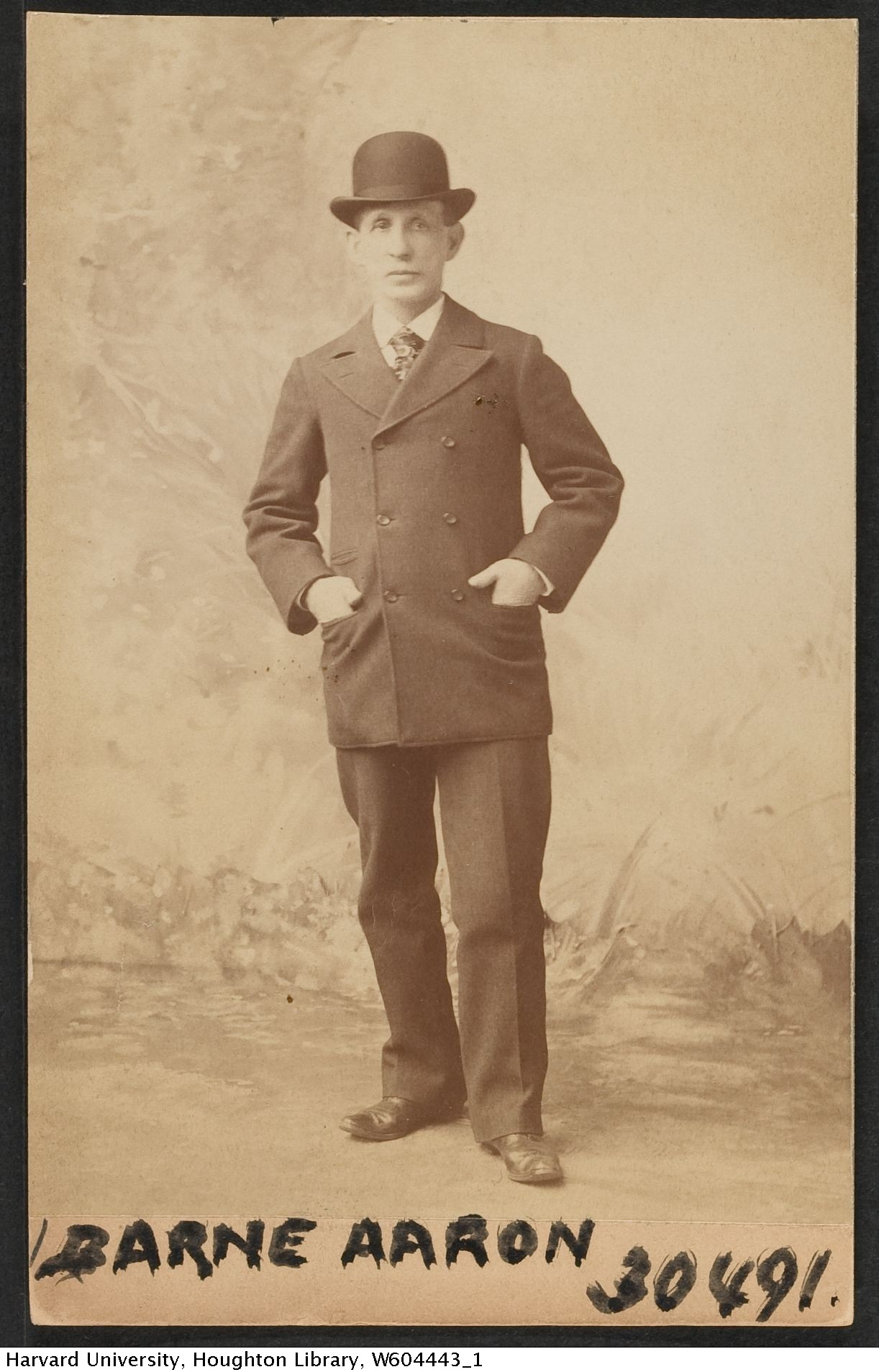
Young Barney Aaron

Young Barney Aaron was born on July 27, 1836, probably at Duke's Palace in the Aldgate section of London where his father was known to reside.

Like his father before him, Aaron was a hard-hitting bare-knuckled fighter, but he fought in a new era under different rules than his famous father. The elder Aaron battled under "Broughton's Rules"; Young Barney fought under the Pugilistic Society's "London Prize Ring Rules," which had been developed in 1838. Modified in 1853, only three years before young Barney began his professional career, the Rules stated the ring should be 24 square feet (2.2 m^{2}), surrounded by two ropes. Any knockdown marked the end of the round, and the downed fighter had 8 seconds to "come to scratch" unaided, or the fight was over—under Broughton's Rules, a fighter had 30 seconds to return to the center of the ring, and had the help of his handlers. Therefore, bouts were recorded according to the number of rounds and length of time; 3-minute rounds were not developed until the late-19th century.

On July 9, 1856, on Rikers Island, Aaron fought a man named Johnny Robinson beginning at daybreak. The bout lasted for 80 rounds, 2 hours and 20 minutes, and resulted in Aaron being declared the winner. They had previously met indoors for a seventeen round bout that was declared a draw.

=== American Lightweight Champion, September 1857 ===
On September 28, 1857, he defeated American Lightweight Champion Johnny Moneghan in Providence, RI. The fight lasted eighty rounds and took 3 hours and 20 minutes. With the victory he became the first Jewish fighter to win a ring championship in America. After his victory, he was given the title "Star of the West", after his father's ring name, "Star of the East".

After losing the title the following year to Patrick "Scotty" Brannagan around October 18, 1858, on a foul, he entered a seven-year period of inactivity to recover and because there were few boxers who wished to face him in a match.

=== Reclaiming American Lightweight Championship, 1867 ===
Lightweight Champion Sam Collyer

He returned to the ring after a hiatus close to seven years around July 20, 1866, and lost a 47-round attempt to regain the title against French-born American pugilist Sam Collyer. Collyer was a Union Civil War Veteran and recipient of the Congressional Medal of Honor while fighting for the 139th New York Volunteers. Fighting for an excruciating 2 hours and 5 minutes, both Aaron and Collyer were taken off on stretchers. However, Aaron defeated Collyer in the rematch on June 13, 1867, in a 68-round battle that lasted one hour and 55 minutes to regain the championship. The fight began at 8:50 am, with around 1500 in attendance and was fought outdoors in an Amphitheater on the banks of Aquia Creek in Northern Virginia. Young Barney won the choice of position and wisely took the side of the ring not facing the sun. By the end of the bout, Collyer's eyes were closed causing his seconds to throw in the sponge. The bare-knuckled boxing was desperate and brutal and both boxers were down in various rounds. His bouts with Collyer were considered among his most memorable and significant.

He won newspaper headlines in July 1874 for foiling two pickpockets trying to steal from the Rev. Henry Thorpe, whom they jostled as the elderly clergyman was "riding downtown on a Fourth Avenue [street] car." Aaron applied some of his celebrated "scientific boxing" technique, knocking both thieves down into the street, after first having retrieved the reverend's gold watch, which he returned.

== Life after boxing ==
In retirement, Aaron was said to have "stood up and met all comers" at Harry Hills Houston Street Pit in New York, and later at the fighting resort of Owney Geohegan in New York's Bowery.

Aaron remained in boxing by operating a gym in New York. He also served as a referee and officiated the 1883 John L. Sullivan vs. Herbert Slade bout. In later life, he worked with bookmakers announcing winners at the track. Legend has it that he fought a final bout with a Dooney Harris near the age of seventy just to demonstrate his boxing skills. He died a few days before June 2, 1907, at the age of 70, and was buried in Long Island, New York. He left a widow and two daughters.

== Relatives ==
- His father was British pugilist Barney Aaron.

== Hall of Fame ==
He was inducted into the International Boxing Hall of Fame in 2007.

== See also ==
- List of bare-knuckle boxers
