= Owney =

Owney may refer to:

People

- Owney Madden (1891–1965) New York gangster
- Owney Geoghegan (1840–1885) boxer

Places in Ireland

- Owney and Arra, County Tipperary barony
- Owneybeg, County Limerick barony

Other

- Owney (dog), New York post office mascot

== See also ==
- Oney (song), a song recorded by Johnny Cash
- Owen (name), Owney is hypocoristic form
- Uaithne, name anglicised Owney
