= John Clark (boxer) =

Irish-American boxer, born 1849

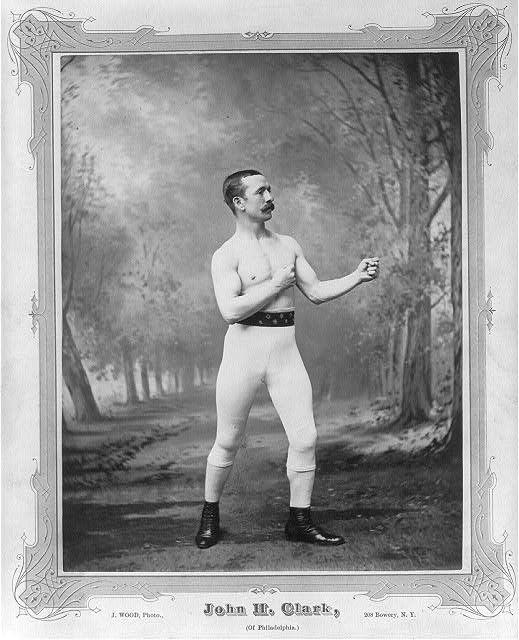
- Clark in ca. 1882

Personal information
- Nickname: Professor
- Nationality: Irish American
- Born: John H. Clark; May 18, 1849 Galway, Ireland
- Died: July 26, 1922 (aged 73)
- Weight: Lightweight

Boxing career

John H. Clark (May 18, 1849 in Oughterard, County Galway – July 26, 1922 in Philadelphia, Pennsylvania) was an Irish-American boxer. He was born in Oughterard, County Galway, but spent most of childhood in England before moving to the United States. Clark was a clog and jig dancer before pursuing a career in prize-fighting. He was the Lightweight Champion of America for two streaks before losing to Arthur Chambers in 1879 following a 136-round bout. He owned a billiard hall and boxing school in Philadelphia.

== See also ==
- List of bare-knuckle boxers
