= Arthur Chambers =

American boxer (1846–1923)

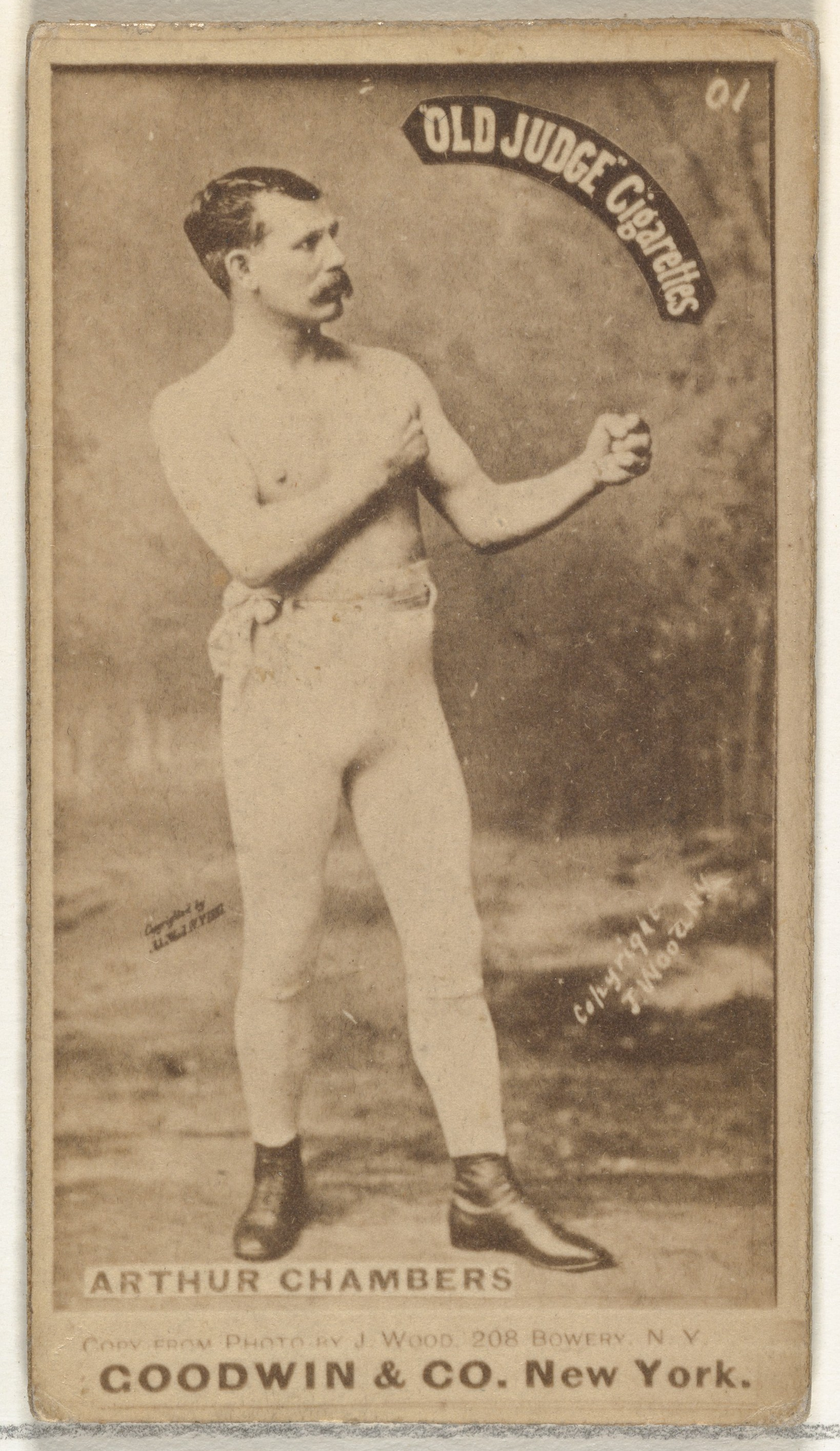

Personal information
- Nationality: English
- Born: Arthur Chambers; 6 December 1846 Salford, England
- Died: 7 April 1923 (aged 76) Philadelphia, Pennsylvania
- Weight: Lightweight

Boxing career

Arthur Chambers (born 6 December 1846 in Salford, Lancashire, England – 7 April 1923 in Philadelphia, Pennsylvania) was an Anglo-American boxer.

== Career ==
Following his service in the Royal Navy, Chambers began his boxing career in 1864, and moved to the United States in 1871. In 1872 he won the Lightweight Championship of America by defeating Billy Edwards in 26 rounds, and again in 1879 by defeating John Clark in the 136th round. He was elected to the Ring Boxing Hall of Fame in 1954 and the International Boxing Hall of Fame in 2000.

In about 1875, Chambers opened a saloon and boxing gym in Philadelphia. He took a two-year hiatus from boxing in 1877 after injuries he sustained when he was attacked outside of his bar required the amputation of the middle finger on his left hand. Chambers operated the saloon until he was refused a renewal of his liquor license in 1896, and he was the chief financial backer of heavyweight champion John L. Sullivan.

== See also ==
- List of bare-knuckle lightweight champions
