= Caleb Baldwin (boxer) =

English boxer (1769–1827)

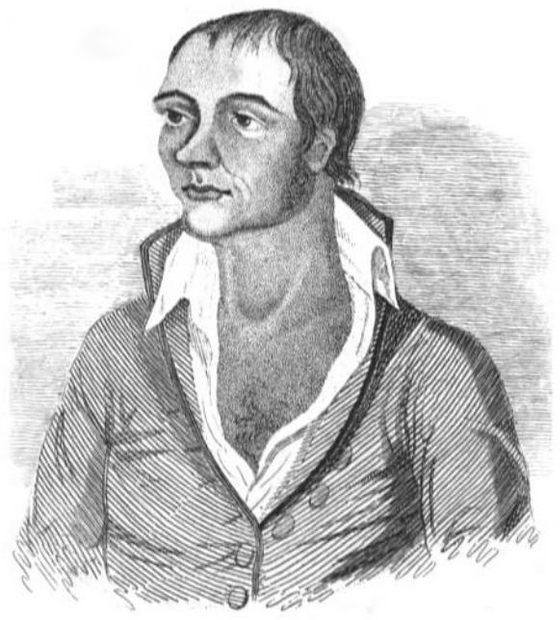

Personal information
- Nickname: "Pride of Westminster"
- Nationality: British
- Born: Caleb Steven Ramsbottom; 22 April 1769 Westminster, London, England
- Died: 8 November 1827 (aged 58) Westminster, London, England
- Height: 5 ft 6.5 in (1.69 m); 133-135 lbs.
- Weight: lightweight

Boxing career
- Stance: Orthodox, right-handed

Boxing record
- Wins: 13 (estimate)
- Losses: 1
- Draws: 1

Caleb Ramsbottom (born 22 April 1769 in Westminster, England – died 8 November 1827), better known as Caleb Baldwin, was a premiere lightweight boxer of the bare-knuckle era in England.

== Early life ==
Baldwin was born on 22 April 1769 in the Lambeth area of Westminster to a fruit seller, or costermonger. During this period, Westminster was considered a poverty-blighted area on the outer edge of London. As he had to go to the markets each day to buy goods to sell all over London, he was forced to defend himself at an early age. Frequent disputes had to be settled with his fists. He continued to work as a peddler on the side during at least the early portions of his boxing career.

== Professional career ==
Baldwin's first recorded prize fight took place in 1786, when he bested a London pork pickler named Jim Gregory. Later that year, English boxing champion Tom Johnson saw Baldwin fighting another man and became his patron. Johnson funded Baldwin's next fight, against highly regarded Arthur "Gypsy" Smith at Kelsey Green, a bout Baldwin dominated.

During the years following the win against Smith, Baldwin, now known as "The Pride of Westminster," established himself as the leading lightweight fighter in England. On 14 May 1792 he fought to a draw against Paddington Tom Jones at Smitham Bottom. Baldwin then easily defeated James Kelly, an Irish shoemaker, at Wimbledon in 12 rounds, taking 15 minutes on 22 December 1800. A relatively modest purse of 20 guineas per side was collected.

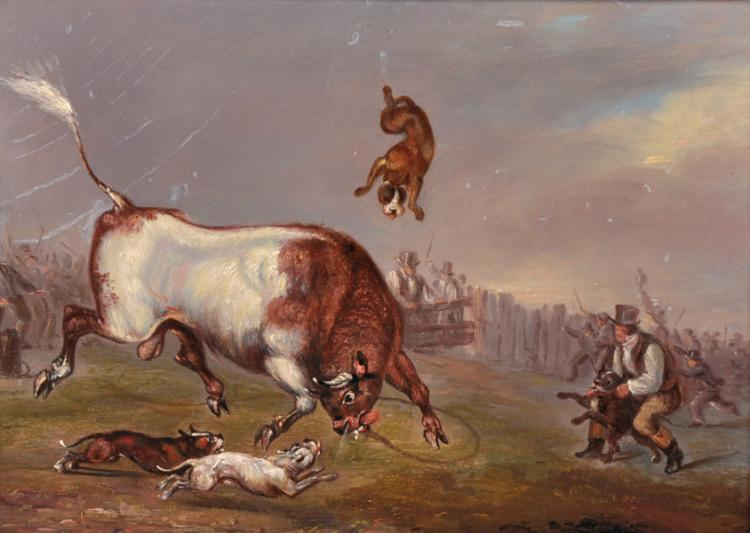
Bull-baiting with dogs, 19th century

Baldwin was also known for participating in "bull-baiting" a sport which used dogs to harass and attack tethered bulls for the entertainment of an audience. Several breeds of dogs, particularly the English bull dog, were bred for this purpose. Though few, if any, specific accounts of his participation in the sport exist in area newspapers, Baldwin was celebrated for his skill in rushing in and catching the dog in his arms when the bull had tossed him. By at least one account, Baldwin participated in the sport in the Westminster area.

Baldwin defeated James Lee, a butcher, on 25 November 1801 at Hurley Bottom, bringing down his opponent with two blows in the thirteenth and then knocking down Lee again in the final twenty-first. London's Morning Chronicle timed the contest at 23 minutes. Though his opponent was not as widely known, on 21 October 1803, Baldwin bested Jack O'Donnell in eight rounds at Wimbledon. A second match was sought for the sum of £100, by the backers of O'Donnell who claimed their boxer had not been at his best in their first meeting, but no record exists of the two meeting a second time.

=== Loss against Dutch Sam ===
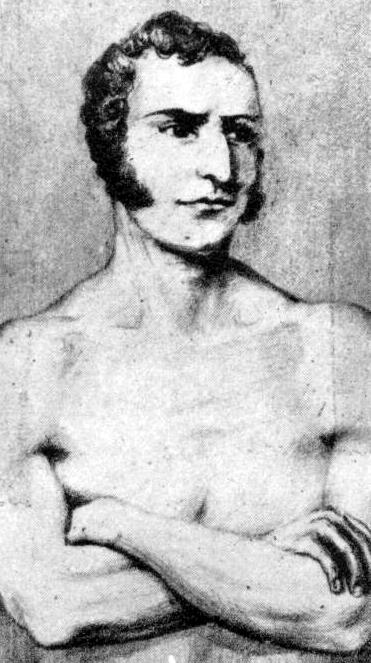
Dutch Sam

For a purse of 25 guineas, at Woodford Green, Essex on 7 August 1804, Baldwin was matched with the exceptional Jewish lightweight Dutch Sam, a future hall of famer who was making a name for himself during the same period. Reporting the following day, London's Morning Post estimated the size of the attending crowd around 500. Though they were close in height, Baldwin was the bigger man by around seven pounds, as well as six years older, and used his superior ring experience and weight advantage to his benefit in the early rounds. The early betting favored Baldwin 2-1. In the 9th, he floored Sam with a terrific blow to the temple, improving the already superior odds on his winning to 4-1, but tired in the later rounds. By the 20th, the tide turned, and the younger Sam struck with uppercuts wreaking havoc on the face of Baldwin. The uppercut was considered Sam's signature punch, a blow he was credited with introducing to in the ring, and his right uppercut was considered particularly powerful. The fight was stopped in Sam's favor after thirty-seven rounds of hard fighting, and Sam's uppercuts proved so devastating that Baldwin had to be carried from the ring. This fight was the only known loss of Baldwin's career.

=== Matches with Bill Ryan and Bristow ===
Available records indicate Baldwin fought just twice more in 1805 and 1816, obtaining draws against Bill Ryan and Young Massa Bristow. Ryan, who Baldwin met on 6 August 1805, was a somewhat heavier and younger opponent, who frequently threw Baldwin from the seventeenth through the twenty-first rounds. Ending the battle at the end of the Ryan match at round twenty-six, a company of Artillery on horseback from Woolwich charged the ring, and as this Cavalry group retained possession of the ground, the spectators began to leave. As both contestants were considered to have fought a valiant and skilled fight, the match was generally considered a draw after fighting around 30 minutes, though a foul was claimed at the end. Several Noblemen were included among the crowd. His last match with Young Massa Bristow occurred as a result of a disagreement with Bristow, a Black servant, and Baldwin, who was acting as master of ceremonies of a boxing match. Deciding to enter the ring to resolve their dispute, Bristow dominated the older Baldwin throwing him to the ground, but after taking £30 after the 13th round, the match was declared a draw.

=== Later life ===
Baldwin retired in 1816 with a record approximated at 13-1-1. On 4 April 1821, at Kent Assizes (court), he was found guilty of assaulting Thomas Gater, an excise officer during the performance of his duty, but further verification of this account may be necessary. Any jail sentence would have been brief as Baldwin was active in the London area within the year.

In September 1825, two years before his death, he attended a boxing match between Jones the Sailor Boy, a known boxer and a fellow costermonger, and Tommy O'Lynne also known as Jemmy Wilson at Old Oak Common, six miles from London. A considerable number of fellow Westminster residents were present. Baldwin later was present at a modestly attended sparring presentation by the great English champion Daniel Mendoza given at a London Tennis Court around 16 November 1825. Many of the greatest boxers of the era were present, including Baldwin's former opponent Paddington Jones, as well as his friend and mentor Tom Johnson. As a tribute, Mendoza demonstrated a boxing style similar to several of the great boxers present.

== Death ==
Baldwin died at 58 on 8 November 1827 at St. Margaret's Workhouse on the outskirts of London, in Westminster, the community where he grew up and lived most of his life. St. Margaret's was an establishment where the poor could exchange lodging for work. In their early years, the primary form of work available to their on-site tenants was knitting and spinning flax. According to London's The Standard, Baldwin had a son, Jem, who in at least one other instance appeared in an area newspaper.

== Selected bouts ==
7 Wins,3 Draws, 1 Loss
Result	Opponent	Date	Location	Result/Duration	Notes
Win	Jim Gregory	1786	London	20 rounds	First match
Win	Jem Jones	1786	Wimbledon, England	15 mins	
Win	Arthur "The Gypsy" Smith	14 May 1792	Kelley Green, England	25 mins	Caleb dominated
*Draw*	Tom Paddington Jones	14 May 1792	Hurley Bottom, Berkshire, England	30 mins	
Win	Jem Jones	3 July 1792	East London, England	40 mins	
Win	James Kelly	22 Dec 1800	Wimbledon, England	12 rounds, 15 mins	Caleb won easily
Win	Jack "Butcher" Lee	25 Nov 1801	Hurley Bottom, England	21 rounds, 23 mins	
Win	Jack O'Donnell	21 Oct 1803	Wimbledon, England	8 rounds	
Loss	Dutch Sam	7 Aug 1804	Woodford Green, Essex, England	37 rounds	Sam used uppercuts after 20th rnd
*Draw*	Bill Ryan	6 Aug 1805	Blackheath, London	26 rounds, 30 min	Fought for 50 guineas A Cavalry charge stopped the fight
*Draw*	Young Massa Bristow	May 1816	England	13 rounds	Bristow took £30 to declare a draw

== Honors ==
Baldwin was inducted into the IBHOF in 2013 in the Pioneer Category.

== See also ==
- List of bare-knuckle lightweight champions
