= Jack McAuliffe (boxer) =

American boxer

Personal information
- Nickname: Napoleon of the Ring
- Nationality: Irish
- Born: Jack McAuliffe; March 24, 1866 Cork, Ireland, U.K.
- Died: November 5, 1937 (aged 71) Queens, New York, U.S.
- Height: 5 ft 6 in (1.68 m)
- Weight: Lightweight

Boxing career
- Stance: orthodox

Boxing record
- Total fights: 38
- Wins: 28
- Win by KO: 20
- Draws: 10

Jack McAuliffe (March 24, 1866 – November 5, 1937) was an Irish boxer who fought mostly out of Williamsburg, Brooklyn. Nicknamed "The Napoleon of the Ring," McAuliffe is one of only fifteen world boxing champions to retire without a loss. He was the first boxer to hold the World Lightweight championship from 1886 to 1893. He was the first European boxer to retire as an undefeated World Champion.

He was inducted into The Ring Boxing Hall of Fame in 1954 and the International Boxing Hall of Fame in 1995.

== Early life ==
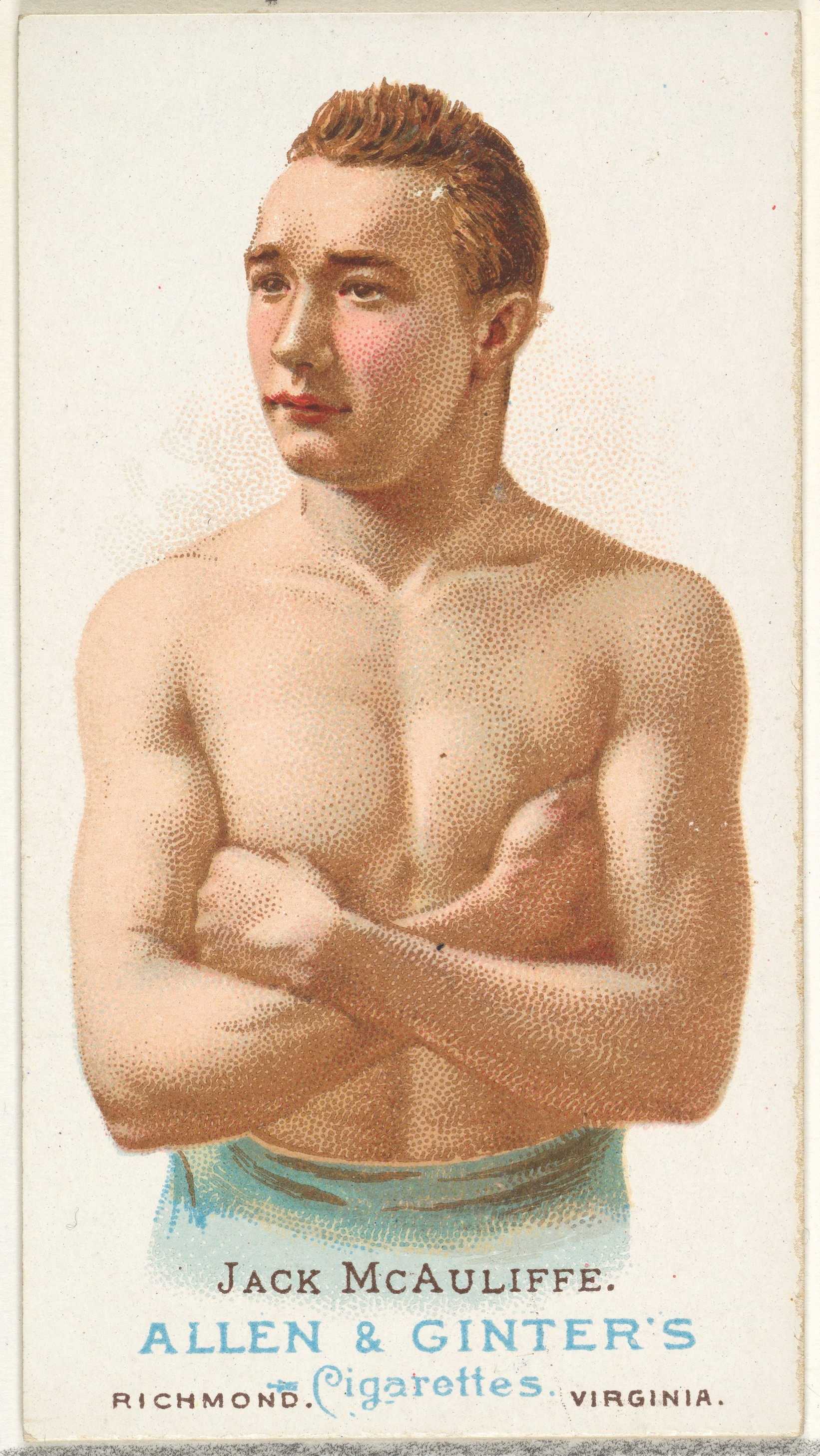
1887 color lithograph of Jack McAuliffe, made for Allen & Ginter Cigarettes

McAuliffe's parents were Cornelius McAuliffe and Jane Bailey, who were living at 5 Christ Church Lane, Cork, Ireland (then part of the United Kingdom), at the time of Jack's birth. McAuliffe emigrated to the United States in 1871, where he spent his early years in Bangor, Maine.

=== Amateur and professional career ===
He made his first appearance as an amateur boxer in 1883. He turned professional soon after, fighting Jem Carney 78 rounds to a draw at Revere Beach, Massachusetts. He fought Billy Dacey for the lightweight championship and a $5,000 purse in 1888, and knocked him out in eleven rounds. He was known as a strong two-handed fighter with "cat-like" reflexes. In 1897 he successfully defended his title against Billy Myer in a highly publicized match at the Olympic Club, New Orleans.

=== Personal life ===
McAuliffe was married twice, both times to stage actresses. His first wife was Katie Hart, who played in farce comedies. After her death, McAuliffe married Catherine Rowe in 1894, whose stage name was Pearl Inman, of the song and dance team The Inman Sisters. Between marriages he dated a third actress, Sadie McDonald. McAuliffe and Rowe moved back to Bangor, Maine, in 1894, where he undertook preliminary training for a fight later that year at the Seaside Athletic Club on Coney Island.

=== Death and retirement from the ring ===
McAuliffe retired in 1897. According to the International Boxing Hall of Fame, he had 36 professional fights. McAuliffe was undefeated with 30 bouts, 22 by knockout. He had five draws, one no decision. He successfully defended his world lightweight title against six different boxers.

He died on November 5, 1937, at his home on Austin Street in Forest Hills, Queens.

== Professional boxing record ==
| 38 fights | 27 wins | 0 losses |
|---|---|---|
| By knockout | 19 | 0 |
| By decision | 7 | 0 |
| By disqualification | 1 | 0 |
| Draws | 10 | |
| Newspaper decisions/draws | 1 | |

All newspaper decisions are officially regarded as “no decision” bouts and are not counted in the win/loss/draw column.

| No. | Result | Record | Opponent | Type | Round | Date | Location | Notes |
|---|---|---|---|---|---|---|---|---|
| 38 | Draw | 27–0–10 (1) | Tommy Ryan | PTS | 10 | Sep 30, 1897 | American S.C., Scranton, Pennsylvania, U.S. | Not to be confused with Tommy Ryan |
| 37 | Win | 27–0–9 (1) | Jim Carroll | PTS | 10 | Nov 20, 1896 | Woodward's Pavilion, San Francisco, California, U.S. | |
| 36 | Win | 26–0–9 (1) | Sam Rogers | KO | 3 (4) | May 8, 1896 | Louisville, Kentucky, U.S. | |
| 35 | Win | 25–0–9 (1) | Harry Pigeon | KO | 7 (6) | Apr 8, 1896 | Opera House, Hot Springs, Arkansas, U.S. | Fight scheduled for six rounds, but they fought another |
| 34 | Draw | 24–0–9 (1) | Owen Ziegler | PTS | 3 (?) | Nov 19, 1894 | Atlantic A.C., New York City, New York, U.S. | |
| 33 | Win | 24–0–8 (1) | Young Griffo | PTS | 10 | Aug 27, 1894 | Seaside A.C., New York City, New York, U.S. | |
| 32 | Win | 23–0–8 (1) | Jim Ryan | PTS | 6 | Jan 16, 1894 | Grand Opera House, San Francisco, California, U.S. | |
| 31 | Win | 22–0–8 (1) | Horace Leeds | NWS | 4 | Apr 1, 1893 | Academy of Music, Philadelphia, Pennsylvania, U.S. | |
| 30 | Draw | 22–0–8 | Billy Myer | PTS | 6 | Dec 10, 1892 | 2nd Regiment Armory, Chicago, Illinois, U.S. | |
| 29 | Win | 22–0–7 | Billy Myer | KO | 15 (?) | Sep 5, 1892 | Olympic Club, New Orleans, Louisiana, U.S. | Retained world lightweight title |
| 28 | Win | 21–0–7 | Bill Frazier | KO | 3 (6) | Jun 2, 1892 | Manhattan A.C., New York City, New York, U.S. | |
| 27 | Win | 20–0–7 | Austin Gibbons | TKO | 6 (?) | Sep 11, 1891 | Granite Association Clubroom, Hoboken, New Jersey, U.S. | Retained world lightweight title |
| 26 | Win | 19–0–7 | Jim Carroll | KO | 47 (?) | Mar 21, 1890 | California A.C., San Francisco, California, U.S. | Retained world lightweight title |
| 25 | Draw | 18–0–7 | Mike Daly | PTS | 15 | Dec 5, 1889 | Cribb Club, Boston, Massachusetts, U.S. | |
| 24 | Win | 18–0–6 | Paddy Smith | TKO | 1 (4) | Feb 28, 1889 | Casino Rink, New York City, New York, U.S. | |
| 23 | Win | 17–0–6 | Billy Boltz | KO | 1 (?) | Feb 28, 1889 | Elgin, Illinois, U.S. | |
| 22 | Draw | 16–0–6 | Billy Myer | PTS | 64 (?) | Feb 13, 1889 | Burche's Opera House, North Judson, Indiana, U.S. | Retained world lightweight title |
| 21 | Win | 16–0–5 | Young Jacob Hyams | KO | 9 (10) | Dec 26, 1888 | Palace Hall, New York City, New York, U.S. | |
| 20 | Win | 15–0–5 | Sam Collyer | KO | 2 (6) | Dec 17, 1888 | Palace Rink, New York City, New York, U.S. | |
| 19 | Win | 14–0–5 | Bill Dacey | KO | 11 (?) | Oct 10, 1888 | a barn, Dover, New Jersey, U.S. | Retained world lightweight title |
| 18 | Draw | 13–0–5 | Patsy Kerrigan | PTS | 10 | Sep 26, 1888 | Way Street Gymnasium, Boston, Massachusetts, U.S. | |
| 17 | Draw | 13–0–4 | Jem Carney | PTS | 74 (?) | Nov 16, 1887 | Revere, Massachusetts, U.S. | Retained world lightweight title |
| 16 | Draw | 13–0–3 | Jimmy Mitchell | PTS | 4 | Mar 4, 1887 | Theatre Comique, Philadelphia, Pennsylvania, U.S. | |
| 15 | Draw | 13–0–2 | Bill Frazier | PTS | 4 | Mar 2, 1887 | Theatre Comique, Philadelphia, Pennsylvania, U.S. | |
| 14 | Draw | 13–0–1 | Walter Campbell | PTS | 4 | Feb 28, 1887 | Theatre Comique, Philadelphia, Pennsylvania, U.S. | |
| 13 | Win | 13–0 | Harry Gilmore | KO | 28 (?) | Jan 14, 1887 | Lawrence, Massachusetts, U.S. | Retained world lightweight title Fought in a barn |
| 12 | Win | 12–0 | Bill Frazier | KO | 21 (?) | Oct 29, 1886 | Fair Play Club, Boston, Massachusetts, U.S. | Retained American lightweight title Won inaugural world lightweight title |
| 11 | Win | 11–0 | Charles Bull McCarthy | PTS | 4 (?) | Jul 24, 1886 | Clark's Theatre, Philadelphia, U.S. | |
| 10 | Win | 10–0 | Bully Carroll | KO | 1 (?) | Jul 21, 1886 | Clarks Club, Philadelphia, Pennsylvania, U.S. | |
| 9 | Win | 9–0 | Charles Bull McCarthy | PTS | 4 | Jul 19, 1886 | Clarks Club, Philadelphia, Pennsylvania, U.S. | |
| 8 | Win | 8–0 | Joe Heiser | PTS | 4 | Apr 20, 1886 | Turn Hall, New York City, New York, U.S. | |
| 7 | Win | 7–0 | Andy Drumm | TKO | 3 (?) | Apr 1, 1886 | New York City, New York, U.S. | |
| 6 | Win | 6–0 | Jack Hopper | TKO | 17 (?) | Feb 27, 1886 | Cedarhurst Country Club, Cedarhurst, U.S. | Won vacant American lightweight title |
| 5 | Win | 5–0 | Charles Bull McCarthy | PTS | 4 | Jan 24, 1886 | Philadelphia, Pennsylvania, U.S. | |
| 4 | Win | 4–0 | Jack Hopper | TKO | 6 (6) | Jan 13, 1886 | New York A.C., New York City, New York, U.S. | |
| 3 | Win | 3–0 | Buck McKenna | KO | 2 (?) | Dec 7, 1885 | Philadelphia, Pennsylvania, U.S. | |
| 2 | Win | 2–0 | Billy Young | DQ | 4 (6) | Nov 19, 1885 | Theatre Comique, Washington, D.C., U.S. | |
| 1 | Win | 1–0 | Joe Milletechia | TKO | 2 (?) | Jul 25, 1885 | Jersey City, U.S. | |

== See also ==
- List of lightweight boxing champions

Achievements
| Inaugural Champion | World Lightweight Champion; October 29, 1886 – November 1893; Retired undefeated | Vacant Title last held by George "Kid" Lavigne |
