= Jem Carney =

English boxer

Jem "Jim" Carney (born 5 November 1856 in Birmingham, England — died 8 September 1941) was an 1880s English Lightweight Champion.

== Early life ==
Jem Carney was born in Coleshill-street, Birmingham on 5 November 1856.

== Professional career ==
Carney began boxing in 1878 and won the English lightweight championship on 20 December 1884 by beating Jake Hyams after a 45-round fight that lasted 1 hour and 45 minutes.

== Death ==
Carney died on 8 September 1941 in London, England.

== Honors ==
Inducted into the International Boxing Hall of Fame: The Class of 2006.
