= Isaac Bitton (boxer) =

Dutch bare-knuckle boxer (1779–1839)

- Bitton by Percy Roberts

Personal information
- Nickname: Bitton the Jew
- Nationality: Dutch
- Born: Isaac Haim Bitton 'Bittoon' in Pugilistica; 29 June 1779 Amsterdam, Netherlands
- Died: 27 January 1839 (aged 59) Stepney, London, England

Boxing career

Isaac Haim Bitton, sometimes Bittoon, (29 June 1779 – 27 January 1839) was a Dutch Jewish bare-knuckle boxer who is most notable for a fight with George Maddox that lasted 74 rounds.

== Early life and career ==
Bitton was born in Amsterdam to Abraham and Rachel, a family of poor Jewish street hawkers. Due to difficult economic circumstances in Holland, he moved to London with his father at the age of ten. Isaac was a fencer, before he took up boxing at the age of 22. As seen at right, he was described as a stout man with a pudgy belly but a powerful build.

A student of the great English champion Daniel Mendoza, Bitton used Mendoza's new scientific style of "boxing", which included careful parrying of opponent's blows borrowed from the sport of fencing, and adopted a stance, as shown at right, with both fists raised to allow both a quick jab with one arm and a ready block of oncoming punches with the other.

=== Tom Jones and George Maddox, 1801-2 ===
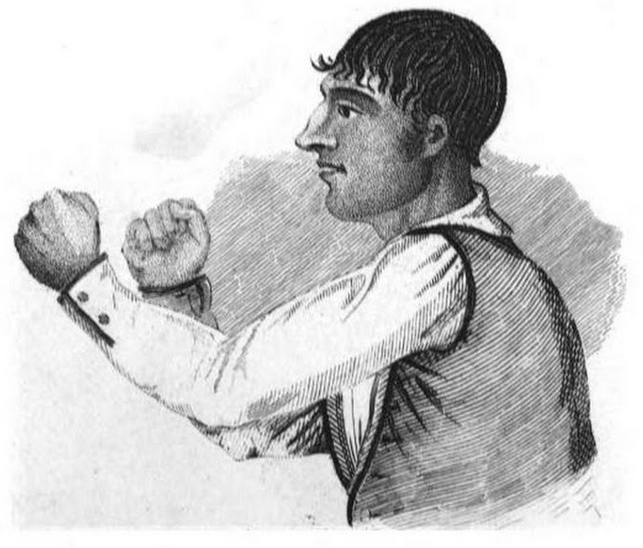
Paddington Tom Jones

On 31 July 1801, in an historic victory, Bitton defeated Paddington Tom Jones, a skilled and well known boxer of the period, at Wimbledon Common. Bitton won the contest by knockout. According to one source, Mendoza was present at the fight, and seconded his protégé Bitton. Jones, seconded by champion Jem Belcher who also helped arrange the bout, was around 32, to Bitton's youthful 22. According to Pugilistica, Bitton was the larger and stronger combatant. Jones was said to have the best of it in the early rounds, but Bitton came from behind and won the match, though Jones led the betting by 3–1, as a result of strong backing by wealthy patrons. Jones was unable to continue the match and resume the contest after being knocked nearly senseless after 20 minutes of fighting. The purse was a substantial 40 guineas. According to one account, a riot occurred after Bitton defeated Jones, between the large Jewish audience and the wealthy and largely Christian backers of Jones and his second Jem Belcher.

He next fought George Maddox to a draw at Wimbledon on 13 December 1802, the match lasting an incredible seventy-four rounds. Bitton had Maddox down repeatedly in the first three rounds, but his opponent exhibited an uncommon toughness in coming back to deliver his own punishment. From the 68th to the 73rd round, Bitton recovered much of his strength and made a good showing in the close contest. Though Maddox's face looked like raw meat by the end of the match, the battle was deemed a draw, as it was stopped by darkness after 1 hour 10 minutes, and representatives determined both men had performed with equal skill.

On Willesden Green on 15 July 1804 for 50 guineas, Bitton fought another match, technically a draw, with William Wood, a London coachman, who stood 5 ft 11 in (1.80 m) in height. The fight was interrupted after fifty-six minutes in the thirty-sixth round by the appearance of officers from Bow Street, as boxing was illegal in London at the time. Wood, however, according to Pugilistica was thoroughly defeated and was "quite worn out" after the long battle.

On 12 July 1807 he fought in an exhibition with Bob Gregson at the Fives Court, St Martin's Street in Leicester Square. On 21 August 1807, he acted as bottle holder along with his friend Daniel Mendoza as second for the Jewish boxer Dutch Sam in his fight with English great Tom Belcher. On 16 November 1812 he assisted Jack Carter in his match against Jack Power.

=== After boxing ===
Shortly after 1804, Bitton retired from the prize-ring, and became a licensed victualler or food seller in Whitechapel. Always a stocky man, his weight ballooned after retirement eventually reaching nearly 238 lbs. or 17 stone. He established an athletic school on Goulston Street, Whitechapel, where he gave instruction in boxing and where trainees could spar. The school also included fencing featuring both "singlestick", which used a cudgel or wooden sword for training, and broadsword, which used a two-edged weapon for cutting. Married to his wife Eve, also known as Elizabeth, at London's Bevis Marks Synagogue on 10 July 1818, he had a large family of eleven children. He died on 27 January 1839, at the Portuguese Jewish Hospital on Mile End Road in Stepney, London, England, at the age of 59. He was buried in the Jewish cemetery near Bethnal Green.

He is an ancestor of the EastEnders actress June Brown and was featured on Who Do You Think You Are? in August 2011.

=== Honours ===
A lyrical verse written by Robert Emery of Yorkshire described Bitton's best features as a boxer; his ability to come from behind in a fight as he clearly did in his fight with Tom Jones and George Maddox, and his pluck or determination (bottom) when needing to win a fight:

"Bittoon then came a champion bold,
And dealt some hard and sly knocks;
But yet when all truth is told,
Some ranked him with shy cocks.
Still prate like this we must not mind,
A Dutchman true begot 'um,
Whoe'er has seen Bittoon behind
Will n'er dispute his bottom."

== Selected bouts ==
1 Win, 2 Draws
Result	Opponent	Date	Location	Duration	Notes
Win	Paddington Tom Jones	31 Jul 1801	Wimbledon Common	20 mins	
*Draw*	George Maddox	13 Dec 1802	Wimbledon Common	74 rnds., 1 hr. 10 mins	Called for darkness
*Draw*	William Wood	15 July 1804	Willesden Green	36 rnds., 56 mins	Bitton was winning the match; 50 guineas
