= Paddington Tom Jones =

British boxer (1766–1833)

Tom Jones
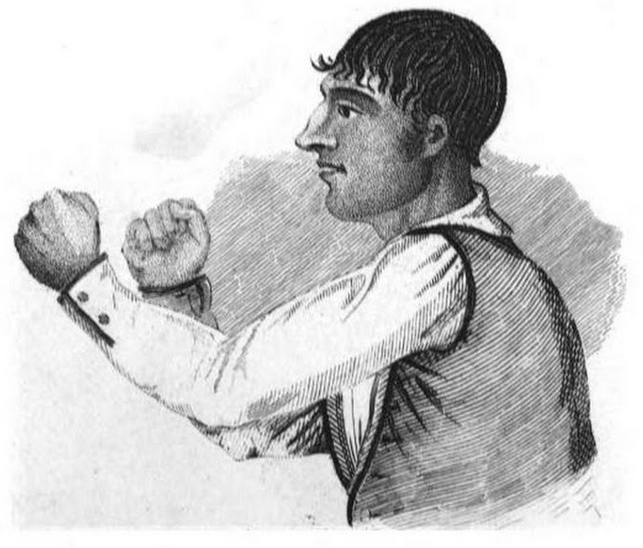

Personal information
- Nickname: Paddington Jones
- Nationality: British
- Born: Tom Jones; 1766 Paddington, London
- Died: 22 August 1833 (aged 67) Paddington, London, England
- Height: 5 ft 8 in (1.73 m)
- Weight: 139–146 lb (63–66 kg); Considered in his day to be a lightweight (although he would be a welterweight based on modern weight classification)

Boxing career

Boxing record
- Wins: 16
- Losses: 3
- Draws: 3

Paddington Jones (1766 – 22 August 1833) was a British bare-knuckle boxer from 1785 to 1805 who also worked extensively as a second (i.e cornerman).

== Early life ==
Jones was born in Paddington, London 'about the year 1766', from whence came his ringname, Tom «Paddington» Jones.

In his early boxing career he came under the eye of boxer Tom Johnson, who recognized his early talent and helped develop his boxing skills.

Throughout his boxing career, Jones acted as Master of Ceremonies at London's Fives and Tennis Courts, frequent boxing exhibition venues, where he hosted and helped plan the bills.

== Bare-knuckle boxing career ==
In a period before the introduction of formal weight-based categories Jones was informally considered a lightweight (although in modern parlance would be considered a welterweight, a designation which did not exist at the time Jones fought). He was tall for his weight, with a hard, slim appearance, and had a narrow face with a long aquiline nose. He is credited with having fought more bouts and seconded more pugilists than any boxer of his day. He fought several notable bare-knuckle boxers of his day, including Caleb Baldwin, and Jem Belcher.

=== Boxing highlights 1785-86 ===
The noted early boxing Pierce Egan notes that the early 'trifling skirmishes of [Tom Jones] are too numerous to be noted'. Jones' first significant fight (i.e fought for stakes) was against Ned Holmes in 1785, at Paddington Fields, for a mere half a crown, which Jones lost. Jones was but an inexperienced youth, and Holmes a full grown man, and Jones could not pull out a victory.

He fought three battles against the one-eyed Sailor in February 1786 for 10, 5, and 7 guineas at London's Hyde Park.

Jones fought Ned Holmes for a second time on 19 December 1786 for stakes of a guinea and a half. This time Jones Jones vanquished the older man in an easy victory.

=== Boxing highlights 1787-92 ===
Sometime in 1786 or 1787, Jones fought a boxer named Aldridge, for a stakes of 2 guineas on one side against a watch on the other. Aldridge was a Life-guardsman, a member of the British army who traditionally guarded the Monarch. Showing greater stamina than his opponent, Jones won the 60 round match at Marylebone, on 19 December 1787. Aldridge had bragged of his skills at Tom Johnson's house, and had the boxer Joe Ward match him with Paddington. Ward acted as second, and some of the best boxing talent in London witnessed the intrepid Jones pull off a victory that brought him considerable attention in boxing circles.

==== Match with Caleb Baldwin ====
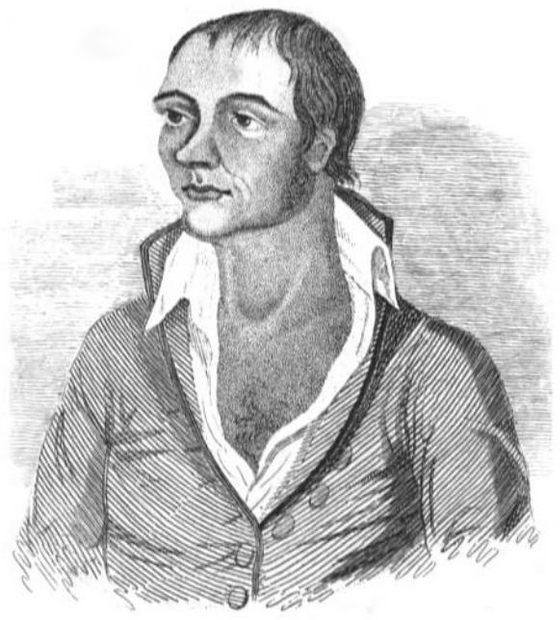
Caleb Baldwin

On 14 May 1792 he fought Caleb Baldwin for a purse of £20 at Smitham Bottom (a remote location about 13 miles south of London in the area now known as Coulsdon on the outskirts of Greater London). The battle was fought on the same constructed stage on which the great Daniel Mendoza had earlier fought Bill Warr for the English Championship. After the Jones-Baldwin fight ended after 30 minutes a dispute arose as Baldwin believed he had won the match, but the onlookers believed it was correctly to be considered a draw.

=== Boxing highlights 1794-1799 ===
Jones fought the Jewish boxer Keely Lyons on 10 May 1794 at Blackheath, for 20 guineas. Former champion Tom Johnson served as Jones' second. The contemporary report states that 'it was a well-contested battle, in which much science and bottom were displayed on both sides; but in the event Jones proved the conqueror'. The two boxers fought again on 22 June 1795 at Hounslow. On this occasion Jones won again, in 9 rounds, 16 minutes.

In August 1795 Jones fought Harris the Spaniard in a match at Lansdowne, Bristol on 12 August 1795. After 20 minutes, Harris bolted with the purse, ending the fight and 'leaving Jones and Co, lamenting'.

==== Bout against Jem Belcher, 1799 ====
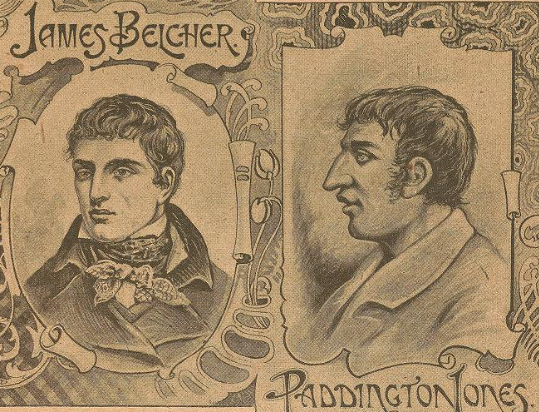
Belcher and Jones, from Famous Fights

On 12 April 1799, Jones lost to the future English champion Jem Belcher in seventeen rounds (lasting thirty-three minutes). The fight was for a purse of £50 and was held at Old Oak Common Wormwood Scrubbs, then some distance west of London. Jones had as his seconds Joe Ward and Dick Hall. It was Belcher's first fight in a London ring. Belcher was only 19 and Jones was a more experienced 30. However, Belcher outweighed Jones by about 2 stone (174lb vs 145lb). The contemporary report of the fight in Boxiana reads as follows:

[In] the first round considerable science was displayed on both sides - the experience and skill of Jones were well portrayed: and the dexterity and new mode of fighting, so exclusively Belcher's own, was soon exhibited, but on the termination of the round Belcher was knocked down. The advantages in the second and third round were perfectly reciprocal; but in the fourth and fifth Jones was levelled. In the sixth and seventh rounds Jones showed off in most excellent style - and the amateurs [i.e. spectators] experienced some of the finest displays of the art. [...] It was a clean fight throughout [...] and it might be deemed a model for pugilists in general to follow. [...] The eight and ninth were spiritedly contested, but in the tenth round Belcher put in some tremendous hits, with the rapidity of lightning. This immediately altered the appearance of things [...] Yet Jones nobly contested for victory for the space of thirty-three minutes before he gave in.

==== Later career, 1801-1805 ====
Isaac Bitton by Percy Roberts

On 31 July 1801, Jones fought Isaac Bitton, a Jewish boxer, at Wimbledon Common for 20 guineas a side. The contemporary source Pancratia (which described Bitton as 'Elias', a reference to his Jewish heritage) records that 'For the first 20 minutes Tom evidently had the advantage, and during this time great sport had been afforded to the amateurs [i.e spectators] by the excellent science that was displayed; Elias, however, put in a hit so forcibly behind Tom's ear that he immediately fell, and gave up the contest'. Bitton was apparently a much larger man than Jones. Jem Belcher, by this time English champion, served as Jones' second in this bout.

In March 1802 Jones fought George Nicholls for stakes of 20 guineas a side at Norwood (currently in South London, but at the time a rather remote rural location). Nicholls had previously refused to fight Jones in 1798, stating that Jones was too tall. Boxiana records the 1802 encounter as follows:

Three rounds were well contested, and considerable science was displayed, but in the fourth Nicholls ran furiously in, and getting his head between Jones's legs, and catching fast hold of both his ankles, threw Tom with considerable violence - this was deemed an infringement upon the articles and completely deviated from the rules of pugilism

This resulted in a protracted argument between the fighters' backers and seconds on who had won the fight and entitled to claim the stakes. As no agreement could be reached, the result would seem to have been a draw. In 1805 Nicholls would go on to be the only man to defeat Tom Cribb (English Champion from 1808-1821).

Jones fought Simpson for 10 guineas a side, in a well-fought fight lasting 10 rounds, at Edgware Road, near London in June 1804. Simpson had been a pupil of Jones's mentor Tom Johnson.

The last reported fight of Tom Jones took at Blackheath on August 6, 1805, against 'Lyons the Yokel Jew' (not the same as the Keely Lyons that Jones had fought earlier in his career). Pugilistica reports that 'This was one of the most terrible conflicts in which Tom had been engaged. Yokel was a desperate punisher, and Jones suffered severely in the fight, nevertheless Yokel gave in'.

== Late career as boxing attendant ==
Puglistica noted that 'No man appeared oftener in the character of a second than Tom Jones, and few understood that duty better than himself'. Among a few of the important matches in which he acted as second he attended the black boxer Tom Molineaux in his second battle with Tom Cribb, Burke in his 1804 fight against Hen Pearce, and Peter Crawley in his 1819 encounter with Tom Hickman. He also acted regularly as second for the foremost lightweight boxer of the early 19th century Jack Randall.

== Benefit for Jones ==
On 16 April 1818, a benefit was held for Jones at London's Fifth-Street, Soho. Boxers who sparred at Paddington's well attended benefit included Tom Oliver, Tom Spring, Big Ben Burns, and Jack Scroggins.

== Jones style of boxing ==
The contemporary source Boxiana described Jones as a highly skilled and courageous boxer who trained several successful students. He possessed a strong, protective defensive stance, keeping his left arm extended to block incoming attacks while remaining ready to counter quickly with his right. He struck with significant power, demonstrated ambidexterity, maintained solid footwork, and showed resilience against opponents. His fighting stances were visually disciplined and highly effective for delivering impactful blows.

== Death ==
Jones died at his birthplace, Paddington, August 22, 1833, at the age of 67.

== Paddington Tom Jones career record ==
We do not have full details for Jones career. The following table has been drawn up primarily from information on the list included in Fistiana (1841) page 193, the most complete source available, supplemented by additional data from Boxiana (1830) and Pugilisitica (1906). Sources are sometimes contradictory, so some details show two different possibilities.

16 Wins, 3 Losses, 3 Draws
Result	Opponent	Date	Location	Duration	Stakes/Purse
Loss	Ned Holmes	1785	Paddington Fields, London	Unknown	Half a crown
Win	George Stringer	1785 or 1786?	Paddington Fields	Unknown	5 guineas a side
Win	Jem Smith	1785 or 1786?	Lissom Green, Paddington	Unknown	12 guineas
Win	One-eyed Sailor	Feb 1786	Hyde Park, London	Unknown	First fight, 10 guineas
Win	One-eyed Sailor	Feb 1786	Hyde Park, London?	Unknown	Second fight, either 10 or 7 guineas
Win	One-eyed Sailor	Feb 1786	Hyde Park, London?	Unknown	Third fight, 5 guineas
Win	Ned Holmes	19th Dec 1786	Harley Fields, nr Portland Place	Unknown	a guinea and a half
Win	Jack Aldridge, the Lifeguardsman	19 Dec 1787	Paddington Fields, Marylebone Fields or Harley Fields	60 rounds (or 15 minutes, sources differ)	Fought for 2 guineas vs a watch (or 6 guineas a side, sources differ)
Win	Jack Blackwell	1788?	Harley Fields	Unknown	10 shillings
Win	Tom Burley	1788?	Harley Fields	Unknown	10 shillings
*Draw*	Caleb Baldwin*	14 May 1792	Smitham Bottom, Coulsdon	30 mins	Purse of £20
Win	Dick Horton	soon after 14 May 1792	The Ring, Hyde Park	Unknown	20 guineas
Win	Abraham Challice	5th Sept 1792	Bentley Green, Colchester	15 mins	Subscription purse of 30 guineas
Win	Keeley Lyons	10 May 1794	Blackheath	10 mins	20 guineas
Win	Keeley Lyons	22 June 1795	Hounslow	9 rounds, 16 minutes	10 guineas
*Draw*	Spaniard Harris	12 Aug 1795	Lansdown Bristol	20 minutes	Harris ran off with the purse
Win	The Chaffcutter	6th Apr 1797	Two Waters, Herts	22 rounds, 38 mins	4 guineas
Loss	Jem Belcher*	12 Apr 1799	Old Oak Common, Wormwood Scrubs	17 rounds, 33 mins	25 guineas a side
Loss	Isaac Bitton	31 July 1801	Wimbledon Common	4 rounds	Lost purse of 40 guineas
*Draw*	George Nicholls	March 1802	Norwood Common	4 rounds, ended in dispute	20 guineas a side
Win	Simpson	June 1804	Putney Green or Edgware Road	10 rounds	10 guineas a side
Win	Lyons the Yokel Jew	Aug 6th 1805	Hounslow or Blackheath	Unknown	10 guineas a side

== Honors ==
Jones was elected to the International Boxing Hall of Fame in 2010.
