= Robert Gregson (filmmaker) =

American filmmaker

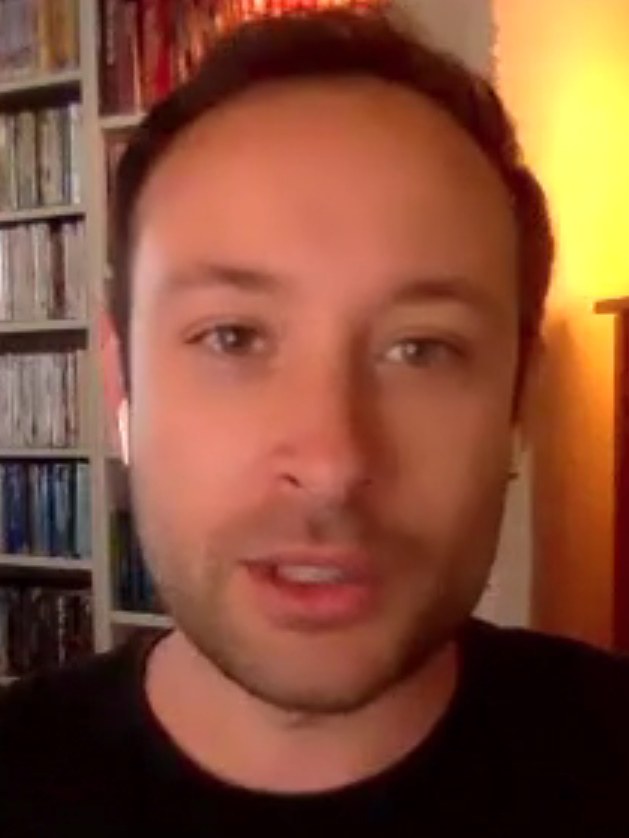
Gregson in 2021

Robert Gregson is an Emmy-winning American filmmaker.

== Career ==
Between 2012 and 2013, Gregson directed sketch comedy shorts for comedy collective Local Empire, which were featured on College Humor, The Onion, and Huffington Post. In 2014 he directed the short film The Refrigerator which won the Best New Director Award at the 2015 Brooklyn Film Festival.

In 2015, Gregson directed the feature film Trivia Night, a dark comedy about an underground pub quiz trivia legend in NYC. Trivia Night earned the Best Feature Film Award at the 2016 Omaha Film Festival. Additionally in 2015, during the reconstruction of the Ed Sullivan Theater for the Late Show with Stephen Colbert, Gregson directed Envisioning a New Home for The Late Show, a viral mini-doc about the renovation.

Gregson's short film work led to directing commercials for brands like Google, Hospital for Special Surgery, United Nations Environment Programme, ARM architecture family, and FEED Projects. In 2024 a 7-part commercial campaign he directed for Hospital for Special Surgery won an Emmy for Best Commercial Campaign.

Between 2020-2025, Gregson wrote and directed five short films including Shut Eye, A Good Couple, Color to Color, The Interpreters, and Blood Stone. A Good Couple premiered at Dances With Films 2021 and earned the Best Screenplay Award at Rhode Island International Film Festival He expanded the short into feature screenplay, Shadow Island, which was selected to participate in Stowe Story Labs in 2024.
