= Johnny Moneghan =

Johnny Moneghan (1830 in Liverpool, England – ?) was a lightweight bare-knuckle boxer. He gained the recognition of becoming the first official Lightweight Champion of America. He stood 5' 4 ½" and weighted approximately 124 pounds.

== Boxing career ==
Although we do not know a great deal about Johnny Moneghan, we do know that he was born in Liverpool, England in 1830.

=== First claiming the American Lightweight Championship, December 1855 ===
After traveling to the United States, Moneghan settled in New York, and took on prize fighting. It is unknown how many contests he fought, but on 18 December 1855 he was proclaimed Lightweight Champion of America when he defeated James Hart after 45 rounds, and 51 minutes of fighting. The contest was held in Canada to avoid any police interference.

Moneghan fought James Hart again on 19 July 1856 in Beverly, MA. This time he lost the contest and his title in the seventh round. This bout is often incorrectly listed by historians, including the late Nat Fleischer, as ending in the tenth round.

=== Reclaiming the American Lightweight Championship, September 1857 ===
Hart retired, and Moneghan immediately reclaimed the title, which he held until his battle with Young Barney Aaron on September 28, 1857. The two men fought near Providence, RI for 80 rounds and over three hours before Moneghan was forced to accept defeat.

After losing his title, Moneghan continued to box for some time. On 19 July 1860 he defeated Harry McLain in 80 rounds in Fort Ward, NY.

After contesting in an exhibition in 1863, his name no longer appears. Little is known of his death or later life.

== See also ==
- List of bare-knuckle boxers
