= The Awful Truth (disambiguation) =

The Awful Truth is a 1937 film starring Irene Dunne and Cary Grant.

The Awful Truth may also refer to:

== Films ==
- The Awful Truth (1925 film), a film with Agnes Ayres and Warner Baxter
- The Awful Truth (1929 film), a film with Ina Claire and Henry Daniell

== Television ==
- The Awful Truth (TV series), a 1999 American program hosted by Michael Moore
- "The Awful Truth" (SATC episode), a 1999 episode of Sex and the City
- "The Awful Truth" (Alias episode), a 2005 episode of Alias

== Other uses ==
- The Awful Truth (column), an online gossip column by Ted Casablanca
- The Awful Truth (band), an American progressive metal band
  - The Awful Truth (album), the band's only album
- The Awful Truth (play), a 1922 Broadway play by Arthur Richman, basis for the films
