= Jonny Walker (boxer) =

English lightweight bare-knuckle boxer (1819-1888)

Johnny Walker (1 January 1819, in England – 18 September 1888, in London, England) was a lightweight bare-knuckle boxer. He weighed around 133 pounds, and stood 5' 5 ½" (Some sources report 5' 8").

== Early life ==
Walker was born with the name Johnny Badman. He was given his name by the great boxer Peter Crawley who owned a boxing school.

== Boxing career ==
We first hear of Walker's pugilistic career when he challenged Jack Hannan for the Lightweight Championship of England. The contest was held on 1 November 1838 in Oxfordshire. Walker was defeated in 31 rounds and 2 hours and 54 minutes. He again challenged Hannan for the title on 2 April 1839 near Newmarket. This time Walker was defeated in 39 rounds and 3 hours and 48 minutes, after his shoulder was dislocated after a heavy throw.

In 1841, Hannan lost his championship to Johnny Broome, who then retired from the ring in 1842. Following his losses to Hannan, Walker defeated W. Jones on 2 June 1841, Fred Mason on 18 January 1842 and Ned Adams on 5 July 1842. With these three victories Walker established himself as the rightful successor to Broome's title and was thereafter never defeated.

Sometime around 1850, Walker relinquished his title and traveled to the United States with his brother Alf Walker. There he opened a bar in Philadelphia, Pennsylvania. While owning the bar, "one of his favorite amusements was to stand against the wall and bet any one the drinks for the house that he could not strike him in the head with his fist. He was very quick at dodging, and seldom lost." He returned to England in 1853, where he planned a comeback, which never occurred.

== Later life ==
Although widely respected in his day, Johnny Walker died a poverty-stricken man in a London hospital on 18 January 1888. The great fighter did have a son, Tommy Walker, who was also a pugilist.

== See also ==
- List of bare-knuckle boxers
