= Harry Hill (sportsman) =

British boxer (1827–1896)

- Born: 1827; Epsom, England
- Died: August 27, 1896 (aged 70); Flushing, New York, United States
- Occupations: Businessman, sportsman and saloonkeeper
- Known for: Bowery sportsman and saloonkeeper.

Harry Hill (1827 – August 27, 1896) was an English-born American businessman, sportsman and saloonkeeper whose establishments were regular meeting places for sportsmen, gamblers and politicians as well as members of the criminal underworld of New York City during the late 19th century. The most famous of these was his Bowery gambling resort located on West Houston Street east of Broadway and was long considered "one of the sights of the metropolis" from the 1850s until its close in 1886.

== Background ==
Harry Hill was born in Epsom, England around 1827. Spending his childhood at the local Epsom Downs Racecourse, his uncle, Henry Hill, was a prominent gambler and served as the betting commissioner of Lord George Bentinck for a number of years. In 1850, he became acquainted with George M. Woolsley, part owner of the sugar manufacturing firm Howland, Aspinwall & Woolsey, and later hired him to run his horse stable in Astoria. In addition to free room and board, Hill would receive a yearly salary of $150. Two years later, Hill moved to New York where he became a successful horse dealer in the neighborhood of Third Avenue and Twenty-Fifth Street.

== Sporting ==
He was also an avid sportsman, involved in wrestling and pugilism, and opened a sporting house at Houston and Crosby Streets. This establishment soon proved a successful and popular resort among sportsmen, gamblers and members of the criminal underworld for almost thirty years. Hill himself declared the place "open to all classes", although he allowed no fighting, robberies or other unruly behavior. He had placards put on the walls specifying the rules of the establishment. Legitimate fights did take place however, most notably, when Harry Hill himself defeated champion middleweight wrestler Lieutenant Alnsworth of New Britain, Connecticut.

From time to time, Hill was known to fight with customers, most often known criminals, who disregarded Hill's rules. In 1868, Hill was stabbed with a penknife by a female customer he had angered. James "Wild Jimmy" Haggerty, a well-known Philadelphia criminal, was involved in a brawl with Hill when, in 1871, he threatened to "do him up" during an argument. Hill fought with Haggerty and another man, Billy Tracy, throwing the two out with the help of British lightweight boxer Billy Edwards. During the fight, Hill lost a large diamond stud that he regularly wore in his shirt.

Another incident took place with Felix Larkin, the financial backer of the "Irish Giant" Ned Baldwin, when he accused Hill and William E. Harding of causing him to lose a horse race. He and several thugs entered at Hill's resort with the intention of killing Harding. The two men did draw their pistols, however no gunfight took place. Both Harding and Larkin were arrested but later discharged. Soon after leaving the precinct, Larkin and his party attacked another saloonkeeper who stabbed him to death with a cheese knife.

Throughout the 1860s and 70s, Hill was involved in virtually every major bare knuckle boxing event of the era. In Mike McCoole's bout against Joe Coburn, Hill arranged for Australian Kelly and Dan Kerrigan to train McCoole. He was also one of the backers of Billy Edwards in his 1868 match against Sam Collyer for the American lightheavyweight championship and a $2,000 purse at Cone River, Virginia.

Hill was known to be exceedingly honest, especially in financial matters, and was often given the responsibility of holding large cash purses from prize fights. In 1870, he was the stakeholder for the $5,000 prizefight between Coburn and Jem Mace. In the 1882 prize fight between John L. Sullivan and Paddy Ryan in Mississippi City, Hill held the $25,000 purse. This also applied to his resort when he would often deposit money and valuables from intoxicated patrons and return their property when the eventually sobered. One of the best known examples was an incident in 1884 when a drunken customer left $84,000 to Hill for safekeeping. The following morning when the man sobered up, he returned Hill's place with no recollection of leaving the money with Hill. Hill gave the surprised man his money and kindly "advised him to leave New York before taking another drink".

By the mid-1880s, Hill was reportedly worth between $500,000 and $1,000,000 although he himself never admitted to an income higher than $250,000. Hill eventually owned a number of businesses including two high class hotels in Flushing, Long Island and several steamboats which carried both freight and passengers between Flushing and New York City. He also possessed large numbers of fine Durham and Alderney cattle, pedigree dogs and horses. He was also forced to make heavy payments to police officials, at least $300 a week, until publicly accusing two officials from the Prince Street Police Station of blackmail and extortion; he appeared before the Lexow Committee years later providing details for "protection payments". The two officers were transferred to the West 100th Street Station while Hill's place was ordered to close after 1:00 am. This caused his resort to suffer as the majority of his business occurred from midnight until sunrise.

== Financial troubles ==
His troubles worsened when collectors began demanding payments for notes he had endorsed for many of his friends. He had mortgaged his property in Flushing and was also forced to close his steamship line, losing both his hotel and shipping businesses largely due to mismanagement. Hill lost heavily in these ventures and, unable to keep up with the mortgage payments, he was nearly bankrupt. Closing his resort, he moved to Harlem where he opened a small business at the southeast corner of Harlem Bridge but police interference forced him to close after a short time. Hill left New York after being refused a license from the city and opened a hotel in Corona, Long Island in 1890.

Hill ran the hotel for three years until it was destroyed in a fire in 1893. He continued to keep a local barroom and horse stable in the area until coming down with a sudden illness in mid-August 1896. Suffering chills and fever for a week, he died in Flushing on August 27, 1896.

He appeared as a minor character in the 2004 historical novel A Passionate Girl by Thomas J. Fleming.
