= Awful Gardner =

American boxer

Hezekiah Orville "Awful" Gardner (c. 1825-c. 1895) was a notorious prizefighter, gambler and thug who became one of America's first celebrity Christian converts, as well as a distinguished trainer of pugilists.

== Early life ==
Hezekiah Orville Gardner was born around 1825 at New York, being a brother to four other sluggers. He was the older brother of Howell "Horrible" Gardner, a notorious pugilist turned evangelist himself. Orville "the Awful" Gardner was described as being over six feet tall, and having a powerful build, even in advanced age.

== Fighting career ==
He used the name Orville "the Awful" Gardner, becoming one of the best fighting men in New York along with the famous John "Old Smoke" Morrissey and the infamous William "Bill the Butcher" Poole. The name 'Awful Gardner' brought fear into all fighting men in the country during the 19th century. Gardner became known as the celebrated prizefighter of Newark City and was known as a street fighter. Gardner killed a man and was forced to leave Newark for New York City where he became an emigrant runner.

Gardner earned fame as a pugilist after going 33 rounds with Allen McFee in 1847, resulting in a victory for Gardner. Gardner was involved in several affrays all over the country and he became a distinguished boxing trainer of such champions as John Morrissey, Tom Hyer, and Joe Coburn.

Gardner was a friend of Morrissey and trained him to become the Heavyweight Champion. Gardner is often noted for holding Yankee Sullivan's arms back while letting his boxer (Morrissey) get in some hits. Gardner was never known to be in a gang but was a Bowery thug, possibly being one of Morrissey's allies rather than one of his gang members (Gardner being older and trainer to Morrissey, as well as Gardner being a friend of Bill Poole). Newspapers reported in 1856 that Gardner would most likely defeat Dominick Bradley for the Heavyweight Championship of America.

== Gaining a notorious reputation ==
Gardner had earned notoriety as a boxer but became notorious as one of New York's bad characters. The name 'Awful Gardner' began to fit him from all of his sinful ways of drinking and gambling, as well as his 'awful' ways of brutality in and out of the ring. He also was an emigrant runner.

Gardner was always in the newspapers usually for barroom brawls. He beat several men in a brawl in 1852 at the Oyster Saloon, escaping the police. The New York Times called him 'Mr. Awful Gardner' after having bit another pugilist's nose or ear off after an argument in 1853 (later setting up a prize fight with the other boxer). Gardner fled to Canada after being charged with assault but returned in 1854 after his son drowned. Gardner spent time in jail and in 1855 he was convicted of assault and battery in another case. He was sentenced to six months in the Sing Sing Prison, being released in 1856, but he would return.

== Reform and Christianity ==
After his release he gave up drinking and tried to reform thinking he would never see his son again if he continued his sinful ways. He attended the Revival of 1857 at New York City and found God, converted his brother Howell, and the New York Times noted his transformation. He no longer went by the nickname "Awful Gardner" and he became a preacher whom many came to see. Gardner gave interviews and converted many. Jerry McAuley noted that Gardner, whom he had known as desperado, had given a powerful sermon at the Sing Sing Prison which converted many convicts, including McAuley. Later Gardner started what he called a “Coffee and Reading Room” in a New York City ward that was notorious for drunkenness and other vices. It evolved into something that became known as the Drunkard's Club, which helped more than 700 men sober up and lasted until Gardner's health failed, and he withdrew from its leadership. Gardner was in and out of newspapers across the country. He was mistakenly thought to have been killed in 1883, but it was his brother Howell Gardner, who died from burns received in an explosion. Orville had become ill in the late 1870s, living in the Home of the Aged and Infirm as an inmate. Gardner soon made headlines in 1889 when he was sent to an Insane Asylum. He most likely died of his illness.
