= Bob Gregson =

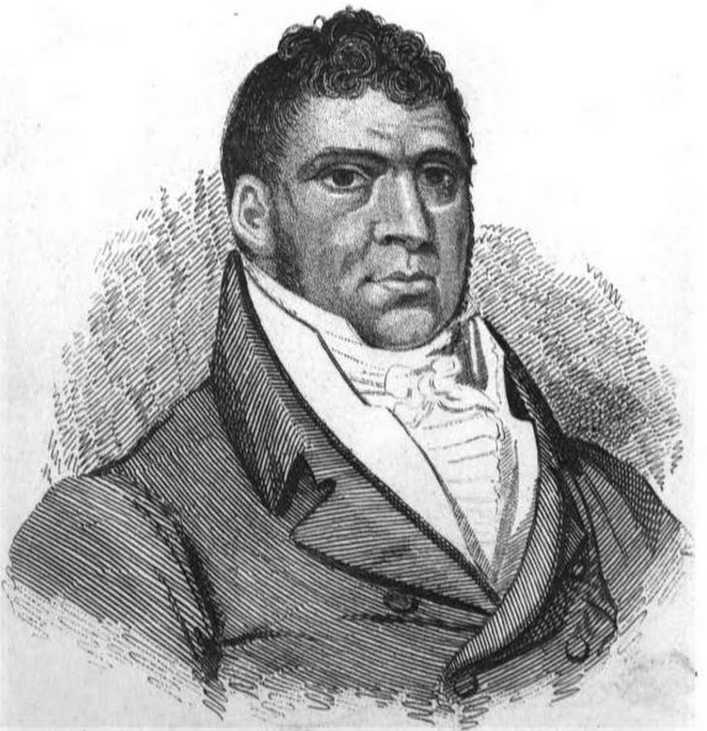

Bob Gregson (21 July 1778–November 1824) billed as "The Lancashire Giant" was a bare-knuckle fighter of the early 19th century. He was a ferry captain and the owner of a chophouse in Holborn in London. A bust of Gregson is located in the Royal Academy.

Born as Robert Gregson in Heskin in Lancashire in 1778 he was a relatively well-educated and cultured man who dressed well and wrote poetry, earning himself the sobriquet "The Poet of the Prize Ring". Gregson became known as "The Lancashire Giant" on account of being 15 stones in weight and standing at six feet two inches tall. Sir Thomas Lawrence, principal painter to George IV selected him as the subject for a life-study; and he was chosen by the professor of anatomy at the Royal Academy to illustrate the beauties of anatomical proportion. He was an acquaintance of Lord Byron who helped to raise the funds to get Gregson released from debtors' prison in 1808.

John Gully (centre right) defeats Gregson in their second contest near Woburn in 1808

On 12 July 1807 Gregson was presented for the first time in an exhibition bout against Isaac Bitton at the Fives Court, St Martin's Street in which Gregson gave a good account of himself. On 14 October 1807 Gregson was defeated by John Gully in a fight at Six Mile Bottom near Cambridge in 36 rounds when Gully was declared the winner after a fight in which both pugilists were badly beaten and which left many onlookers uncertain as to who had really won. The two clashed again on 10 May 1808 when Gully once more successfully defended his English title by defeating Gregson in 24 rounds near Woburn in a contest which lasted for an hour and a quarter. Gully announced his retirement later that year. Gregson and Tom Cribb then fought on 8 October 1808 for the championship and 1,000 guineas in a 30 foot ring in 23 rounds at Moulsey Hurst. Cribb defeated Gregson.

From 1808 he owned a London pub The Castle in Holborn, otherwise known as "Bob's Chop-House" (also known as "Bob Gregson's Coffee House", the Castle Tavern, and the Napier) which became the unofficial headquarters of boxing ring patrons and pugilists alike, but he was a bad businessman and was forced to give up the pub in 1814 after being convicted for debt evasion. He set himself up as a bookmaker and fight promoter and became a poet penning among other works "British Lads and Black Millers". In 1816 he was the owner of the Punch House on Moor Street in Dublin in Ireland while in 1819 he received a benefit display in London before embarking on a sparring tour of Ireland along with Dan Donnelly and George Cooper.

Gregson married Ester Owen (died 1806) and with her had three daughters: Mary Ann Gregson (1802-1848); Henrietta Gregson (1804-1882) and Ester Gregson (1806-1878) who became known as "Sister Scholastica" at Abbots Salford Convent and who purchased Stanbrook Abbey, where she was Abbess from 1846–62 and again 1868-72.

In later years Gregson was virtually penniless and lived out his last days in Liverpool where in July 1824 he was again imprisoned for debt. He died in Liverpool in November 1824 aged 46 and was buried in St. Nicholas’ churchyard.
