= Billy Edwards (boxer) =

English boxer (1844–1907)

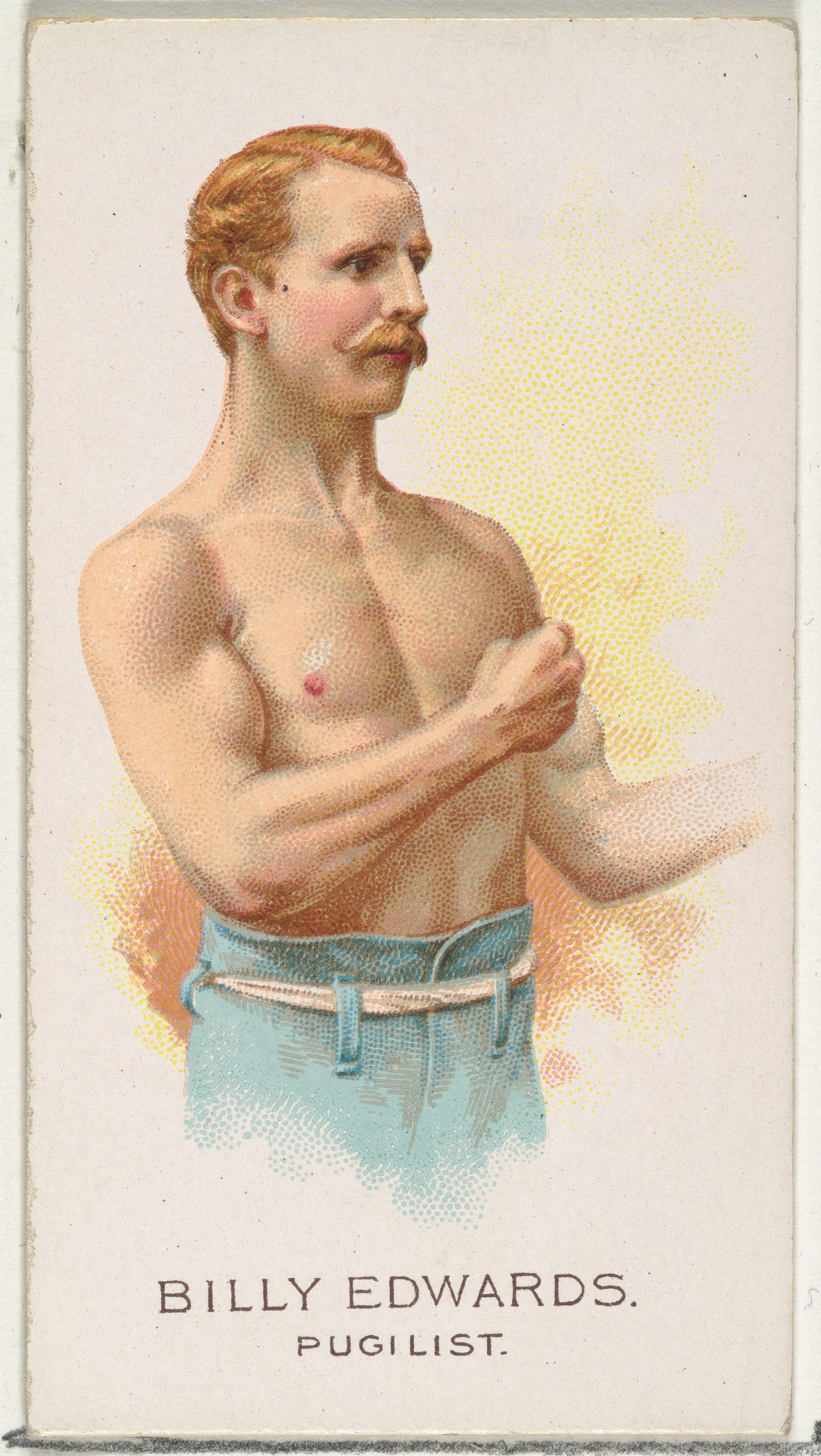
Billy Edwards, Pugilist, from World's Champions, Series 2 (N29) for Allen & Ginter Cigarettes

Billy Edwards (21 December 1844 – 12 August 1907) was a lightweight boxer of the late 1860s and 1870s in England.

== Professional career ==
Nicknamed "Make-Believe Billy", Edwards was born in Birmingham, Warwickshire. He began boxing at the age of 14 and fought Sam Collyer on 24 August 1868 for the American Lightweight Championship. Edwards won the fight in the 34th-round to win the title.

Edwards fought Hall of Famer Charlie Mitchell in 1884, losing in the 3rd round.

== Life After Boxing ==
Following the Mitchell bout, Edwards retired from the ring but remained in boxing by training John L. Sullivan for several winning contests.

Edwards was a successful real estate investor after retiring. In 1894 Edwards appeared as himself in the Edison Company's kinetoscope film Billy Edwards and the Unknown Boxer, in a pre-determined-outcome exhibition match against a random boxer. This film survives and is preserved in the Library of Congress.

== Death ==
Edwards died of Bright's Disease on 13 August 1907 in Brooklyn.

== Honors ==
Edwards has been elected to the International Boxing Hall of Fame.
