= Owney Geoghegan =

American boxer

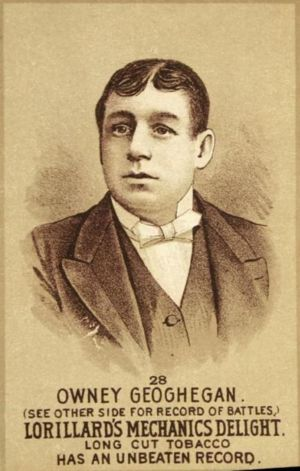

Owen "Owney" Geoghegan (c. 1840 – January 19, 1885) was a lightweight bare-knuckle boxer. Geoghegan claimed the Lightweight Championship of America in 1861, and held it until his retirement in 1863. He stood 5 ft 6 in (168 cm) and weighed between 130 and 140 pounds.

== Boxing career ==
Geoghegan was born in about 1840 in Ireland. He traveled to the United States in 1849 and settled in New York City His first recorded prize-fight took place in 1860 against Jim McGann in New York. Geoghegan won the bout in five rounds and 15 minutes. That same year, he defeated Deaf Moran, Bill Dukes, Arthur Gowan, and held a draw with Mike Donohue.

Patrick "Scotty" Brannagan retired as Lightweight Champion of America in 1861, and a contest was held between Geoghegan and Eddie Touhey to fill the vacant title. The two men met on April 18, 1861, in New York. Although Toughey was a better boxer, Geoghegan wore his opponent down with his incredible strength. After 45 rounds, and 61 minutes, Geoghegan was declared the new champion.

Between 1861 and 1863 he defended his title against Bob Slaon, Chick Sullivan, Banty Edwards, and Pat Devlin before being challenged by the 144-pound Con Orem.

The bout between Geoghegan and Orem took place near South Amboy, New Jersey on May 15, 1863. After 19 rounds and 23 minutes, Geoghegan was declared the winner, when his opponent committed an illegal foul. After this contest, Geoghegan relinquished his title and retired from the ring.

== Later life ==
Shortly after retirement, he opened a sporting house at 103 Bowery known as "The Bastille of the Bowery". By 1885, he had opened several gambling houses and was known to give sparring exhibitions. Following the death of his father, Geoghegan slipped into a severe depression. He died soon after, in Hot Springs, Arkansas. Geoghegan was said to have left behind upwards of $100,000.

== See also ==
- List of bare-knuckle boxers
