= 1791 in sports =

1791 in sports describes the year's events in world sport.

== Baseball ==
Earliest known reference

- The broken window by-law in Pittsfield, Massachusetts prohibited "baseball" and other ball games within 80 yards of the new meeting house, the earliest known reference to "baseball" in North America.

== Boxing ==
Events

- 17 January — "Big Ben" Brain defeated Tom Johnson at Wrotham in the 18th round of a fight lasting 21 minutes to claim the Championship of England. Brain held the title until his death from cirrhosis of the liver in 1794.

== Cricket ==
Events

England

- Most runs – Billy Beldham 532
- Most wickets – Charles Cumberland 41

== Horse racing ==
England

- The Derby – Eager
- The Oaks – Portia
- St Leger Stakes – Young Traveller
