= 1789 in sports =

1789 in sports describes the year's events in world sport.

== Boxing ==
Events

- 11 February — Tom Johnson retained his English championship with a victory over Michael Ryan at Rickmansworth in 12 round 33 minute fight.
- September — Tom Johnson was scheduled to fight "Big" Ben Brain but it was not held because Brain was ill.
- 22 October or 22 November, depending on source — Tom Johnson retained his English championship with a victory over Isaac Perrins at Banbury in the 62nd round of a fight lasting one hour 15 minutes.
- 23 October — "Big" Ben Brain defeated Jack Jacombs at Banbury in a 1-hour 25 minute to 1 hour 26 minute 36th round fight.
- 18 December — "Big" Ben Brain defeated Tom Tring in a 19-minute 12th round fight at Dartford.

== Cricket ==
Events

- John Sackville, 3rd Duke of Dorset, organised an international tour of English cricketers to France, but it was abandoned following the outbreak of the French Revolution

England

- Most runs – Billy Beldham 306
- Most wickets – Robert Clifford 39

== Horse racing ==
England

- The Derby – Skyscraper
- The Oaks – Tag
- St Leger Stakes – Pewett
