= 1794 in sports =

1794 in sports describes the year's events in world sport.

== Boxing ==
Events

- "Big Ben" Brain announced his comeback to the ring and he also reclaimed the Championship Title Of England.
- 24 February — "Big Ben" Brain and William Wood were scheduled to fight but it was not held due to Brain being very ill.
- 8 April — death of Ben Brain from cirrhosis of the liver. The Championship of England became a vacant title.
- 12 November — Daniel Mendoza defeated Bill Warr in five rounds at Bexley Common to claim the vacant Championship of England. Mendoza held the title for six months until April 1795.

== Cricket ==
Events

- Surrey gave odds to an England XI who fielded 13 men for two games against the county's eleven in September. This is believed to be the only time this has happened.

England

- Most runs – Billy Beldham 488
- Most wickets – Thomas Lord 44

== Horse racing ==
England

- The Derby – Daedalus
- The Oaks – Hermione
- St Leger Stakes – Beningbrough
