= John Jackson (English boxer) =

English boxer (1769–1845)

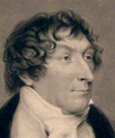
- Jackson at 52, posing for artist, circa 1821

Personal information
- Nickname: "Gentleman" John Jackson
- Nationality: English
- Born: 1769 London, England
- Died: 7 October 1845 (aged 76) Mayfair, London, England
- Height: 5 ft 11 in (1.80 m)
- Weight: About 14 st (200 lb; 89 kg)

Boxing career
- Stance: Orthodox

Boxing record
- Total fights: 3
- Wins: 2
- Losses: 1
- Draws: 0

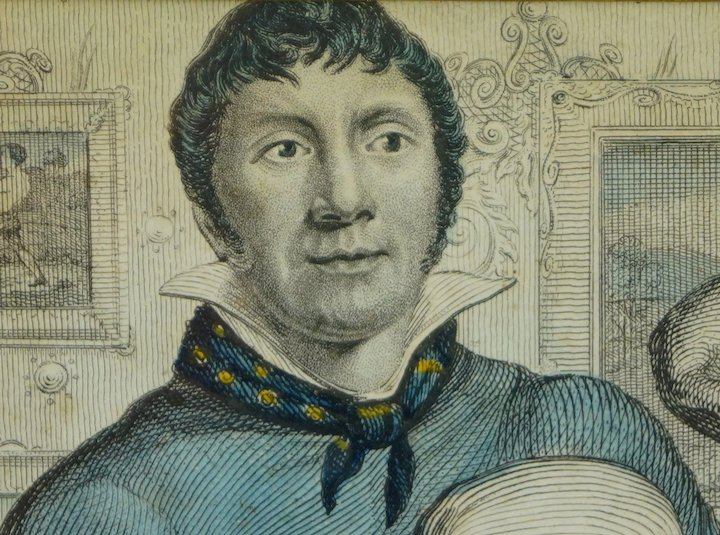
Lithograph of Jackson (1821)

John Jackson (1769 – 7 October 1845) was a celebrated English pugilist of the late 18th century. He is sometimes described in 20th and 21st century sources as having been the bare-knuckle boxing champion of England in 1795, after defeating Daniel Mendoza. However, sources from the 1790s and subsequent decades never describe either Jackson or Mendoza as having been champions of England.

== Early life and early boxing career ==
John Jackson was born in London in 1768 to a middle-class family, originally from Worcestershire. His father was an eminent builder. In an era when the great majority of prizefighters came from lower working-class backgrounds, Jackson's middle-class background led to his nickname of 'Gentleman' Jackson.

In his boxing prime, Jackson stood 5 ft 11 in (1.80 metres) and weighed 14 stone (200 lb; 89 kg). His symmetry in frame and muscular development made him a prized model for sculptors and painters. Aged 19, Jackson 'became a frequenter of the sparring schools, and displayed such talents as proved that he was destined to eclipse the most favoured of his contemporaries [...] He soon found patrons of the highest grade'.

Shortly afterwards, on 9 June 1788, Jackson fought his first prizefight against William Fewterel of Birmingham. The location was Smitham Bottom (currently Coulsdon on the outskirts of Greater London). Fewterel was considered a formidable opponent, with 18 previous victories to his name. A near contemporary account of the fight records as follows:

Fewterel was a man of extremely great bulk, so much so, that at first setting to it was doubted whether Jackson would be able to knock him down, but this he never failed to do, whenever he could make good his blows. The contest lasted an hour and seven minutes, its decision being very much procrastinated by Fewterel's frequently falling without a blow, and when down, remaining so log on the floor, as often to require the interposition of the umpires to remind the seconds of time [i.e. to remind them that a fallen fighter had 30 seconds to get up and continue the fight]. Fewterel, however, gave up the contest, and Major Hanger, by command of the Prince of Wales, who was present, gave Jackson a present of a banknote.'

The well-known caricaturist and printmaker James Gillray was also present at the fight and made it the subject of a popular print of the day.

In Jackson's second prizefight he faced George 'The Brewer' Ingleston on 12 March 1789 at the Swan-yard, Ingatestone, Essex. Ingleston had been instructed in pugilism by the champion of the day, Tom Johnson, and was a taller man than Jackson, standing at over six foot. He was said to have 'fought slowly but struck very hard'. The contemporary report of the fight ran as follows:

At first setting to, betting was even; Jackson gave the first knockdown blow, and before the fourth round odds changed to seven to four in his favour, when, from the stage being wetted by rain, Jackson slipped down, dislocated his ankle and broke the small bone of his leg; in consequence of this unfortunate accident, he was obliged to give in, and the Brewer was declared victorious.

Jackson is recorded as having offered to be strapped to a chair to continue the contest, if Ingleston would agree also to fight seated in a chair. Ingleston, however, refused.

For the following six years Jackson fought no further prizefights and may be presumed to have continued to work in the family business as a builder, and as an artist's model. He seems to have remained in prizefighting circles during this period, however, and to have been well connected and held in rather high esteem. He worked as bottle-holder for Richard Humphries in his 1790 bout vs Daniel Mendoza, and performed the same service for Bill Warr in his bout against Mendoza.

=== Beating Daniel Mendoza ===
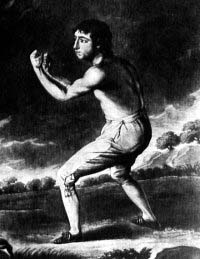
Daniel Mendoza posed with guard up

Jackson's previous experiences of watching Mendoza at close quarters will doubtless have proved useful to him in 1795 when he was matched against Mendoza for a sum of 200 guineas a side. The bout took place on Monday 15 April at Hornchurch, Essex, and was fought on a stage erected in a natural hollow capable of accommodating upwards of 3,000 spectators. Jackson was five years younger than Mendoza, 4 inches (10 cm) taller, and 3 stone (42 lb; 19 kg) heavier (Mendoza would these days have been classified as only a middleweight). Mendoza, however, was an experienced campaigner who had previously beaten larger opponents, and it was only Jackson's third fight. In the run-up to the bout, opinion was split on who would be the more likely to win, with the betting circulating at around 5–4 in Mendoza's favour.

The fight started slowly, with a minute elapsing before a blow was struck, but by the third round Mendoza appeared to have the better of Jackson with bets now being made at 2–1 in his favour. In the fourth round the match began to swing in Jackson's favour as he inflicted a cut on Mendoza's right eye - and then in the fifth Jackson 'caught his opponent by the hair, and holding him down, gave him several severe blows, which brought him to the ground. Mendoza's friends called out 'foul!' but the umpires decided on the contrary. Odds had now changed two to one on Jackson' Mendoza didn't recover after this. Jackson dominated the next four rounds and Mendoza and resigned the match after falling to end the 9th round. 'The fight only lasted 10 minutes 30 seconds and 'was acknowledged by every [spectator] to be the hardest contested that was ever fought in so short a time. Jackson was very little hurt, leaping from the stage with great agility, but Mendoza was quite cut up'.

== Jackson's boxing academy ==
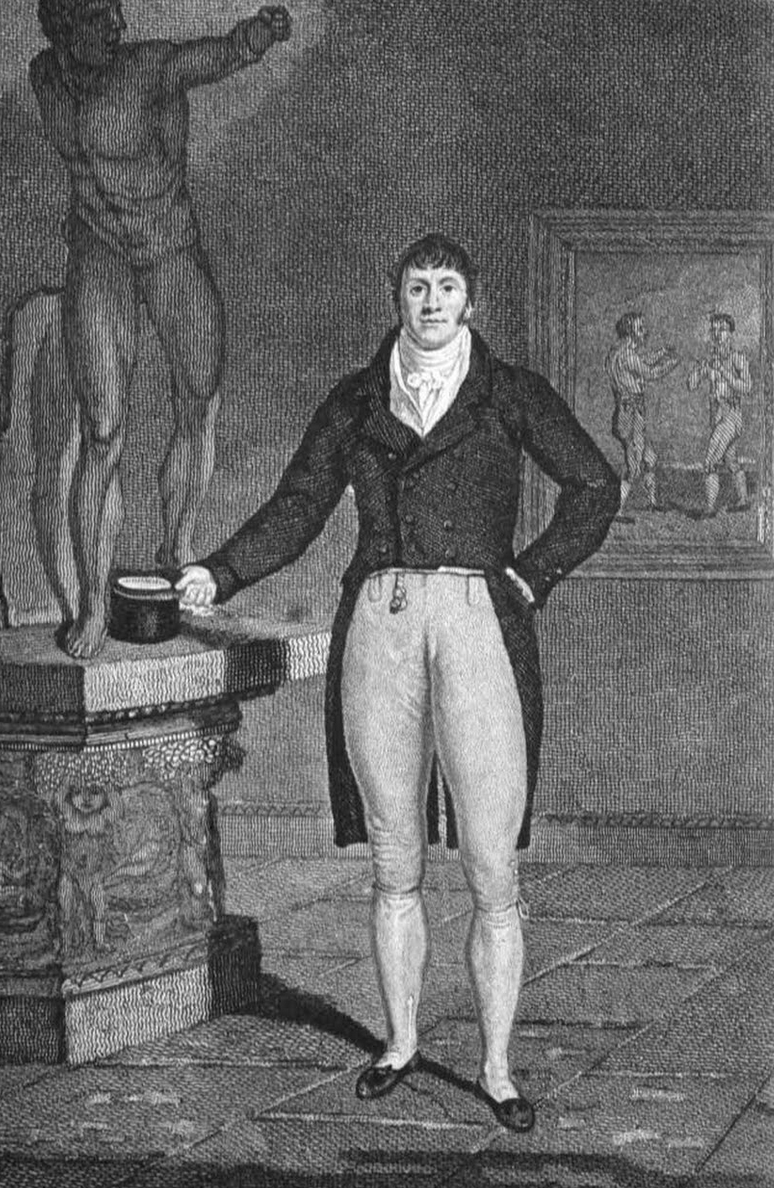
Jackson at his boxing academy, 1830

After his victory over Mendoza, Jackson's public profile allowed him to open a boxing academy for gentlemen at 13 Bond Street, in the West End of London, where he also resided. He was highly thought of as a boxer, but also as an instructor, and the venture was a great success. It is noted in Pugilistica that 'Not to have had lessons of Jackson was a reproach. To attempt a list of his pupils would be to copy one-third of the then peerage'. One of Jackson's students was the famed poet Lord Byron who was an avid follower of boxing. Byron related in his diary that he regularly received instruction in boxing from Jackson, and even mentioned him in a note to the 11th Canto of his poem Don Juan. Most of the instruction at Jackson's academy seems to have taken place with the students wearing 'mufflers' (i.e. gloves).

During the period from 1795 to 1800 Jackson fought no further prizefights and appears to have concentrated on his (presumably rather lucrative) teaching activities. It is unclear when Jackson retired from his career as an active prizefighter. Mendoza challenged him to a re-match in 1800, but Jackson responded in a letter published in 'Oracle, or Daily Advertiser' on 1 December 1801, stating that he had retired from the ring - this apparently having been his first public statement to this effect.

Jackson was known as a kindly and charitable figure and organised exhibitions by other boxers to raise money for charity. In 1811 he raised £114 'to alleviate the sufferings of the Portuguese, whose towns had been destroyed by the French', and in 1812 raised £132 for the benefit of British prisoners in France.

=== Founding of the Pugilistic Club, 1814 ===
On 22 May 1814 Jackson helped to establish the 'Pugilistic Club', which acted as a body to regulate the running of prizefighting as a sport. The club also collected subscriptions from wealthy patrons, which allowed it to supplement the winning of prizefighters. The club served a variety of purposes, including exposing any crooked behaviour. In the run-up to fights being organised, a stakeholder was appointed to hold the substantial stakes laid down by the fighters' financial backers. Jackson often served this responsible role. The Pugilistic Club also served as a mediator and decision maker of last resort in the event of disagreements arising between prizefighters or their financial backers. Officials of the club kept order at prizefights and wore a uniform of blue and buff, and the stakes surrounding the ring were emblazoned with the initials 'P.C.'.

Jackson was also often in attendance at prizefights of the period and frequently acted as a referee, resolving any disputes related to the rules of prizefighting. After each fight Jackson showed his charitable nature by passing round a collection for the benefit of the defeated fighter.

In June 1814 Jackson was asked to give several exhibition of pugilism for the benefit of visiting dignitaries. Present were, amongst others, the Emperor of Russia, Blucher, the King of Prussia, the Prince Regent (subsequently George IV) and the Prince of Mecklenburgh. Jackson himself exhibited alongside other prizefighters such as English champion Tom Cribb, and Jem Belcher, Ned Painter, Bill Richmond and Tom Oliver.

In 1821, Jackson was asked to supply a force of 18 famous prizefighters to preserve order at King George IV's Coronation. All were fitted out in royal pages' uniforms for the occasion. The King had been an avid prizefighting follower in his younger days and had witnessed Jackson's first fight at Smitham Bottom against Fewterel.

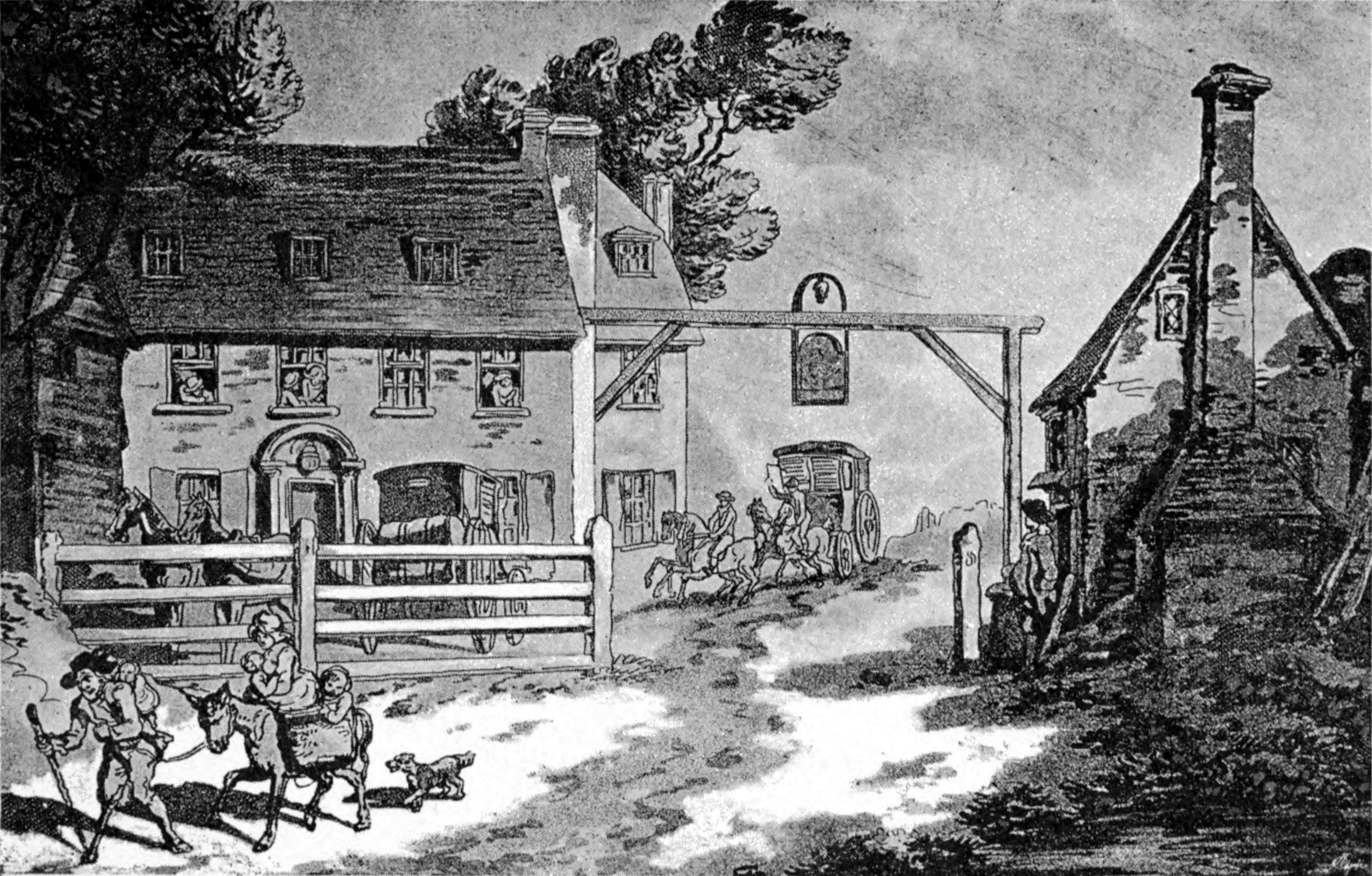
The Cock Hotel in Sutton, 1789.

Later in life Jackson worked as the proprietor of the Cock Hotel, a coaching inn in Sutton on the London to Brighton turnpike road.

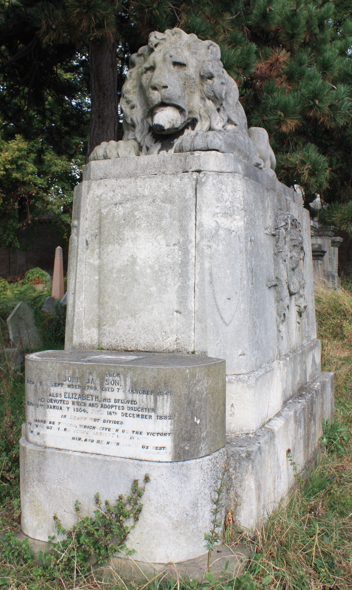
The grave of boxer John Jackson, Brompton Cemetery

==== Death in 1845 ====
When Jackson died, on 7 October 1845, at his home at 4 Lower Grosvenor St. West, in the Mayfair district of London, he was said to be holding the hand of his beloved niece and adopted daughter, Elizabeth. His remains were interred in Brompton Cemetery, London. He was honoured with a monument with a carved lion on his tomb costing upwards of £400 which was provided by his many friends and admirers.

In recognition of his boxing skills, he was inducted into the Ring Boxing Hall of Fame in 1954 and the International Boxing Hall of Fame in 1992.

Byron referred to Jackson as the "Emperor of Pugilism", and the leading prizefight reporter, Pierce Egan, writing in Boxiana declared him to be the "fixed star" of the "Pugilistic Hemisphere".

== Claim to the English Championship ==
The idea that Jackson was English Champion from 1795 (when he defeated Daniel Mendoza) to 1800 appears to date from Hennings's very unreliable 1902 book Fights for the Championship which included much text invented by the author. Sources from the 1790s and subsequent decades (such as Pancratia, Fistiana, Boxiana, and The Sporting Magazine) do not describe Jackson or Mendoza as English Prizefighting Champion and nor do they describe their bouts as championship bouts. The most authoritative account of the history of the English Championship at this time is in Pierce Egan's Boxiana, published from 1813 onwards, which notes that Benjamin Brain remained champion until his death in 1794 and describes no other fighter as English Champion until the emergence of Jem Belcher in 1800. Mendoza and Jackson were undoubtedly the highest profile figures in prizefighting during the period 1794–1799, based primarily on their successful activities as trainers, but in a period with no official boxing organisations, and no official belts, the title of champion could only be bestowed by public acclaim. The absence of any written sources from the period in question extending the accolade to these fighters demonstrates that no English Champions were recognised during this period.

== In popular culture ==
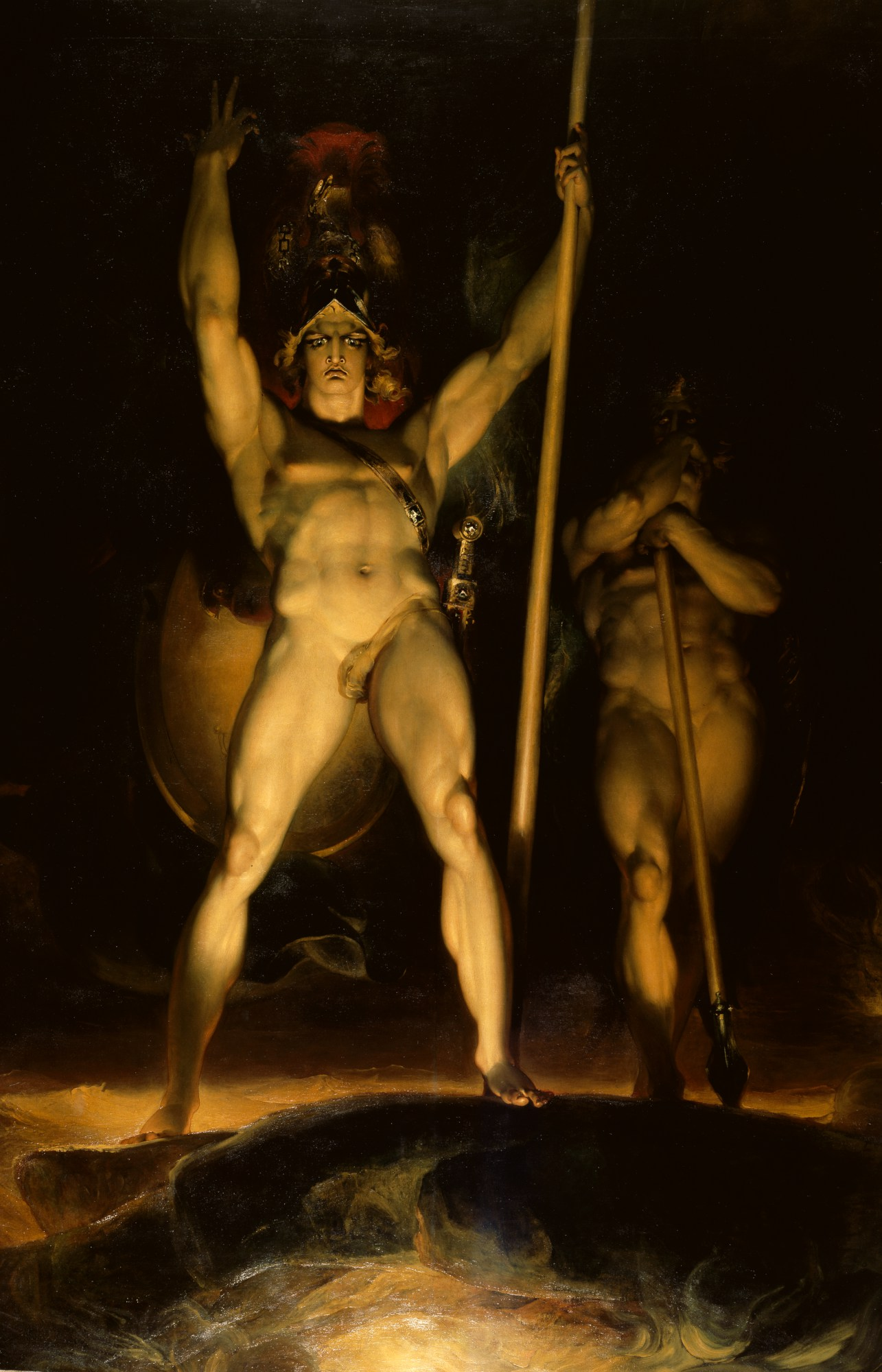
Thomas Lawrence, Satan Summoning His Legions.

In the artist Sir Thomas Lawrence's 1797 exhibition at the Royal Academy, in an enormous painting of Satan Summoning His Legions, the body of Satan was based upon a giant portrait of the muscular Jackson.

Jackson features as a character in Rodney Stone, a Gothic mystery and boxing novel by Sir Arthur Conan Doyle.

He and/or his boxing academy are frequently mentioned in Georgette Heyer's Regency romances.

The characters of boxing opponents Jackson and Daniel Mendoza have minor but important roles in the 1942 British film The Young Mr. Pitt.

In August 2020 Jackson was featured in the BBC Radio 4 programme The Long View, in which he was compared to modern day footballer Marcus Rashford.
