= 1771 to 1775 in sports =

Events in world sport through the years 1771 to 1775.

== Boxing ==
Events

- 18 May 1771 — British champion Bill Darts defeated by the Irishman Peter Corcoran at Epsom Downs Racecourse after seven minutes of the first round. Darts was later accused of accepting a bribe from Captain O'Kelly, a famous turfman, to lose the fight and was obliged to retire in disgrace from boxing.
- 1772 — "Big Ben" Brain defeated Jack Clayton at Kingswood, the round and length of the fight are unknown.
- 1773 — Harry Sellers won against minor opponents in many numerous fights until 1775, whereabouts unknown.
- June 1774 — Corcoran is believed to have successfully defended the title on a number of occasions during the early 1770s but the only opponent who had any credibility was Sam Peters in June 1774 at Waltham Abbey. Corcoran won the fight in fifteen minutes after three rounds.
- 1774 — "Big Ben" Brain defeated Bob Harris at Kingswood, the round and length of the fight are both unknown.

== Cricket ==
Events

- 1771 — the Nottingham v Sheffield match is the first known mention of cricket in Nottinghamshire, even though the Nottingham club was already well-established.
- 1771 — the Chertsey v Hambledon match at Laleham Burway was enlivened by a furious dispute when Thomas "Daddy" White used an extra wide bat to completely obscure his wicket. The Hambledon players objected and a formal protest was written by bowler Thomas Brett and signed by himself, Richard Nyren and John Small. It brought about a change in the Laws of Cricket, as confirmed in 1774, whereby the maximum width of the bat is set at four and one quarter inches (the Law is extant).
- 1772 — detailed scorecards became commonplace and this marked the beginning of "first-class cricket" as a statistical concept.
- 1773 — a grandstand was erected on two occasions at Bishopsbourne Paddock, possibly the first time these structures are known to have been used.
- 1774 — the Laws of Cricket were revised by a committee meeting at the Star and Garter on Pall Mall in London. This version of the Laws includes leg before wicket (lbw) and the maximum width of the bat.
- May 1775 — demands for a third stump were voiced after a single wicket match at the Artillery Ground in which Lumpy Stevens beat John Small at least three times only for the ball to pass through the wicket, still made of two uprights and a crosspiece, without disturbing it. Although the petition was granted soon afterwards, research has discovered that the introduction of the third stump in practice was gradual and the two-stump wicket continued for a number of years yet.
- 13 July 1775 — John Small scored 136 not out for Hampshire versus Surrey at Broadhalfpenny Down, the earliest definite century in first-class cricket.

== Horse racing ==
Events

== Sources ==
- Haygarth, Arthur (1862). Scores & Biographies, Volume 1 (1744–1826). Lillywhite.
