= Mendoza the Jew =

Comic book

Mendoza the Jew: Boxing, Manliness, and Nationalism, A Graphic History is a historical graphic novel written by Ronald Schechter and illustrated by Liz Clarke, and published on November 19, 2013. The comic book features the story of the real life classical pugilist named Daniel Mendoza; a Jewish man who became the heavyweight champion in England, and later transformed the sport of boxing.

== Concept and creation ==
Similar to the critically acclaimed graphic novel Abina and the Important Men in 2011, Schechter wrote the story with a huge emphasis on historical research and accuracy. It featured the theme of using one historical figure or character in explaining the era they belong to. Mendoza the Jew combines a graphic history with primary documentation and contextual information to explore issues of nationalism, identity, culture, and historical methodology through the life story of Daniel Mendoza. Inspirations from the Daniel Mendoza strips from the comic book series The Victor was also used. The graphic novel also became a medium where the author can convey and analyze popular themes during Mendoza's time such as nationalism and antisemitism. A video was also created by Schechter to promote his book.

== Premise ==
Mendoza the Jew combines a graphic history with primary documentation and contextual information to explore issues of nationalism, identity, culture, and historical methodology through the life story of Daniel Mendoza. Mendoza was a poor Sephardic Jew from East London who became the boxing champion of Britain in 1789. As a Jew with limited means and a foreign-sounding name, Mendoza was an unlikely symbol of what many Britons considered to be their very own "national" sport. Mendoza's story reveals the ambivalent attitudes of British society toward its minorities, who were allowed (sometimes grudgingly) to participate in national life by braving pain and injury in athletic contests, but whose social mobility was limited and precarious.

== Reception ==
Martha Cornog from the Library Journal commented on the comic, saying, "A stellar example of how graphic novels can provide a window on a whole world of history and scholarship, Mendoza is also an entertaining and eye-catching read. The solidly researched work of Schechter (Obstinate Hebrews: Representations of Jews in France, 1715–1815) is paired with dramatic and lyrical watercolors from Clarke (Abina and the Important Men). Apparently designed with college undergraduates in mind, the title also works well for high schoolers and casual readers."

Journalist David Dee wrote, "Mendoza the Jew is much more about the study of history than about the study of a famous British Jewish pugilist, the Jewish minority community, or the evolution of sport. As a class- or seminar-room text that can offer students an inspiring introduction to the art and craft of history and act as a demystifier of the discipline, this volume’s worth is inestimable. Yet, the author’s frank discussions of the frustrations, complications, revelations, and collaborations inherent in the crafting of this work of history are also likely to resonate with historians of all levels of experience."
