= James Caulfield =

British writer and printseller

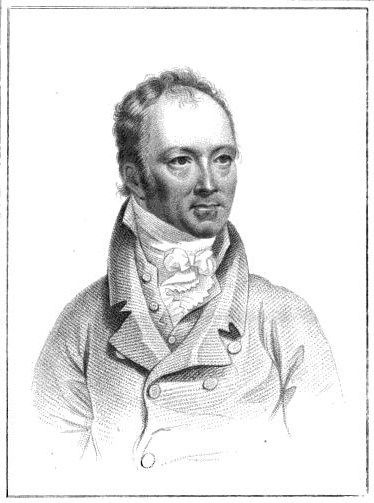
James Caulfield

James Caulfield (1764–1826) was an English author and printseller, known also as a publisher and editor.

== Early life ==
Caulfield was born in the Vineyard, Clerkenwell, on 11 February 1764. His father was a music engraver, but poor eyesight prevented him following in his footsteps. In Cambridge for the sake of his health, he encountered Christopher Sharpe, a print collector, who gave him some etchings, and money to purchase more. Caulfield became a bidder at Hutchins's sale-room in King Street, Covent Garden.

== Dealer ==
Backed by his father, Caulfield set up in business as a printseller in a small shop in Old Round Court, Strand. There he was visited by Samuel Johnson and Richard Cosway. In 1784 Caulfield helped out his father, who had been given large quantity of music by John Ashley, to engrave for the Handel commemoration. With the additional capital he moved to larger premises in Castle Street, Leicester Square. About 1795 he moved, this time to 6 Clare Court, Drury Lane; and in 1797 he occupied premises in William Street, Adelphi, and afterwards in 11, Old Compton Street, Soho.

The publication of James Granger's Biographical History of England in 1769 had boosted the taste for engraved portraits. In 1814 Caulfield resided in Wells Street, Oxford Street, and until 1820 was mainly occupied in the sale of engravings, the illustration of books, and the compilation of catalogues. In more prosperous times he had received the patronage of notable collectors including Earl Spencer, Charles Towneley, James Bindley, and Clayton Mordaunt Cracherode.

== Last years ==
With advancing years Caulfield took to drink, earning five shillings a day as a cataloguer, but kept his youngest daughter and her family. One of his sons seems to have entered into the business, as John Caulfield, "print and book seller, Little Newport Street, Leicester Square".

In January 1826 Caulfield broke his kneecap, and was taken to Camden Town and the house of his brother Joseph, a music engraver and piano teacher. Here he remained six weeks, and then went to St Bartholomew's Hospital, where, after ten days he died on 22 April 1826. He was buried in the family vault in Clerkenwell Church. He married Mary Gascoigne, who died in 1816, and by whom he had seven children; four survived him. He had other brothers, among whom was Thomas, a comedian and mimic, of Drury Lane Theatre, who died in America.

== Works ==
Caulfield's works were:

- Caulfield's edition of curious Tracts: the Age and long Life of Thomas Parr, illustrated with seven elegant Prints from the Designs of Anthony Van Assen, London, 1794, a reprint of Taylor the Water Poet's life of Old Parr, 1635.
- Portraits, Memoirs, and Characters of remarkable Persons, from the Reign of Edward III to the Revolution; collected from the most authentic accounts extant by J. C., London, 1794–5, 2 vols. On his own account, Caulfield began in 1788 to engage engravers to carry out this work, and in 1790 the first part appeared. Other parts followed at irregular intervals. Caulfield's "remarkable characters" include eccentrics and lowlifes.
- The Oxford Cabinet [ed. by J. C.], London, 1797. In 1796 Caulfield visited Oxford, and transcribed a manuscript Anecdotes of Extraordinary Persons, mentioned by James Granger and in the Ashmolean Museum. This work added anecdotes from the notes of John Aubrey and others. Edmond Malone then claimed a prior right to the manuscript; Caulfield was refused any further use of it, and the work was stopped when only two numbers had been published. This dispute led to the next work.
- An Enquiry into the Conduct of Edmond Malone, Esq., concerning the Manuscript Papers of John Aubrey, F.R.S., in the Ashmolean Museum, Oxford [by J. C.], 1797.
- The new Wonderful Museum and Extraordinary Magazine … by Wm. Granger, assisted by many valuable articles communicated by J. C. and others [1803]–1808, 6 vols., with William Granger. A reply to the Kirby's Wonderful and Scientific Museum of R. S. Kirby.
- The History of the Gunpowder Plot, by J. C., 1804.
- Londina Illustrata, 1805–25, 2 vols.; most of the letterpress was supplied by Caulfield.
- Cromwelliana, a Chronological Detail of Events in which Oliver Cromwell was engaged from 1642 to 1658, with a continuation to the Restoration [ed. by J. C.], 1810. Published by Machell Stace.
- Historical Remarks on the ancient and present State of the Cities of London and Westminster,' Westminster, 1810; The Wars in England, Scotland, and Ireland from 1625 to 1660, 1810; Admirable Curiosities, Rarities, and Wonders in England, Scotland, and Ireland, 1811; The History of the Kingdom of Scotland, 1813; The History of the House of Orange, 1814, 6 pieces, edited by J. C. from the editions of 1681–5, usually attributed to Richard or Robert Burton, the pseudonym under which the publisher and author Nathaniel Crouch, published his works. Published by Machell Stace.
- The Antiquity, Honour, and Dignity of Trade [ed. by J. C.], 1813.
- Portraits, Memoirs, and Characters of Remarkable Persons from the reign of Edward III to the Revolution. A new edition completing the twelfth class of Granger's Biographical History of England, by J. C., London, 1813, 3 vols.
- Calcographiana, Guide to the Knowledge and Value of Engraved British Portraits, by J. C., London, 1814, on the printselling trade. Scandal was caused by 'Chalcographimania, by Satiricus Sculptor, a satirical poem in the style of Thomas James Mathias's Pursuits of Literature, with gossip about artists, print-sellers, and collectors. The verse is supposed to have been written by William Henry Ireland, and the notes supplied by Thomas Coram. Caulfield then shortly published Calcographiana, and denied any connection with Chalcographimania. George Smeeton, his biographer, suggested that Caulfield had worked on it in the King's Bench Prison, and the book bears some signs of Caulfield's involvement.
- A Catalogue of Portraits of Foreigners who have visited England, as noticed by Clarendon, Thurloe, etc. [by J. C.], London, 1814.
- The Eccentric Magazine [ed. by Henry Lemoine and J. C.], 1814, 2 vols.
- The Court of Queen Elizabeth, originally written by Sir Robert Naunton under the title of "Fragmenta Regalia", with considerable biographical additions by J. C., London, 1814.
- A Gallery of British Portraits during the reigns of James I, Charles I, and the Commonwealth, 1814, parts i. and ii.
- Memoirs of Sir Robert Naunton, Knt., 1814.
- Portraits, Memoirs, and Characters of Remarkable Persons, from the Revolution in 1688 to the end of the reign of George II, collected by J. C., 1819–20, 4 vols.
- The High Court of Justice, by J. C., 1820.
- Memoirs of the celebrated Persons comprising the Kit-Cat Club [by J. C.], 1821.
- Biographical Sketches illustrative of British History [by J. C.], London, 1823; three numbers issued.
- A Biographical History of England, by the Rev. James Granger, fifth edition, with upwards of 400 additional Lives [ed. by J. C.], London, 1824, 6 vols.

== Notes ==
Attribution

This article incorporates text from a publication now in the public domain: Stephen, Leslie, ed. (1887). "Caulfield, James". Dictionary of National Biography. Vol. 9. London: Smith, Elder & Co.
