= The Age of Innocence (painting) =

Painting by Joshua Reynolds

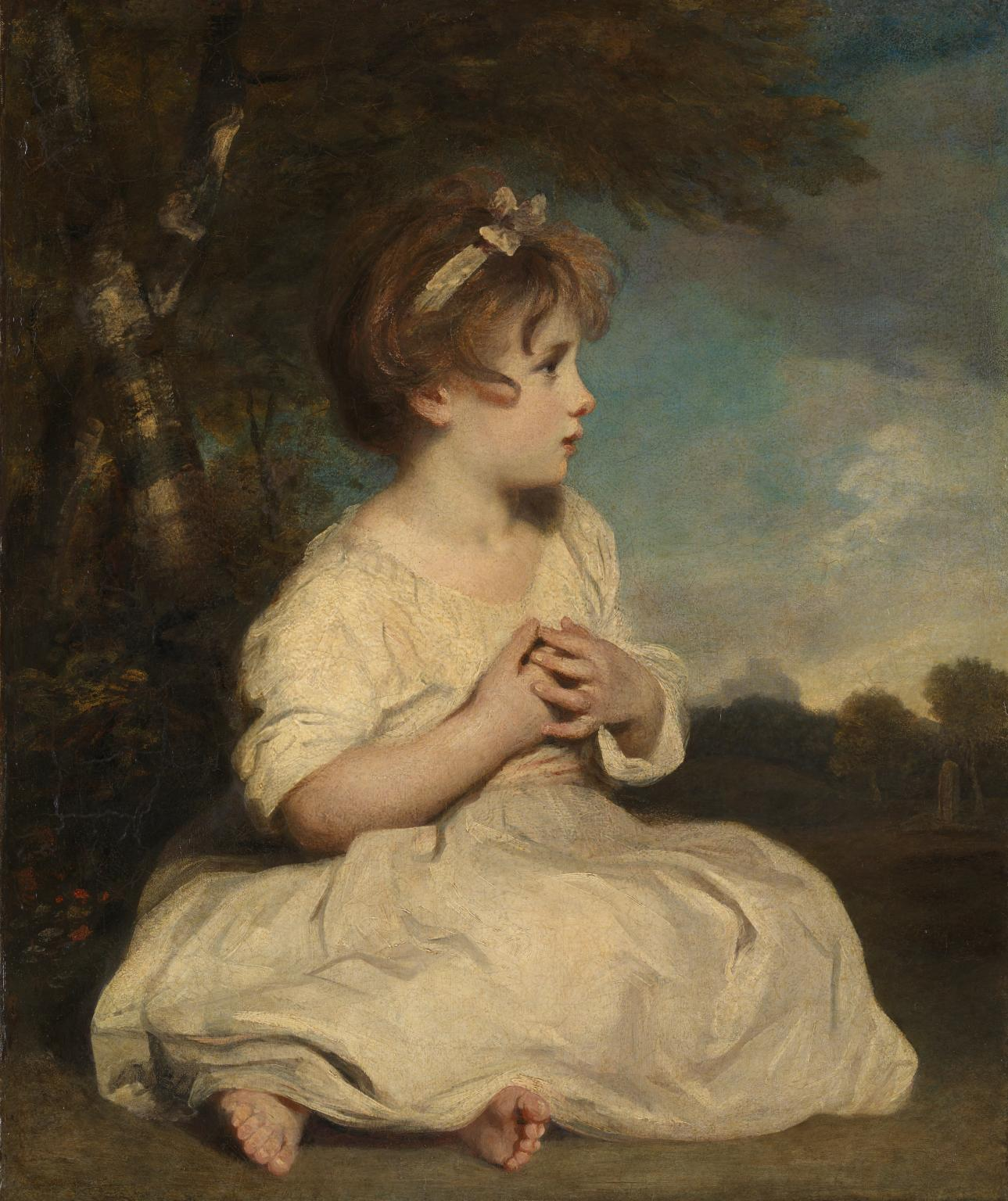
- Artist: Joshua Reynolds
- Year: 1788, possibly 1785
- Medium: Oil painting
- Dimensions: 76.5 cm × 63.8 cm (30.1 in × 25.1 in)
- Location: Tate Britain; London

The Age of Innocence is an oil-on-canvas painting by Sir Joshua Reynolds, created in either 1785 or 1788 and measuring 765 x 638 mm. The sitter is unknown, but possibly, was Reynolds's great-niece, Theophila Gwatkin (who was three in 1785 and six in 1788), or Lady Anne Spencer (1773–1865), the youngest daughter of the 4th Duke of Marlborough, who would have been twelve in 1785 and fifteen in 1788. The painting was presented to the National Gallery in 1847 by Robert Vernon and has hung in the Tate Britain since 1951.

== Genre ==
The painting is a character study, or, in eighteenth-century terms, a fancy picture. It was painted over another Reynolds work, A Strawberry Girl, perhaps because the earlier painting had suffered some paint losses. Only the hands remain in their original state. Since 1859, deterioration of the overpainting also has been documented.

== Popularity ==
The Age of Innocence became a favourite of the public and, according to Martin Postle, “the commercial face of childhood”. It was reproduced countless times in prints and ephemera of different kinds. No fewer than 323 full-scale replicas in oil were made by students and professional copyists between 1856 and 1893. The catchy name given to the painting after Reynolds' death originated with Joseph Grozer in 1794, when he used that title for his stipple engraving of the work. The original title given to the painting by the artist was probably A Little Girl, the title of a work exhibited by Reynolds at the Royal Academy. The title Grozer invented began to be used popularly for the painting and later, it was used knowingly as the title of a 1920 novel by Edith Wharton.

== References and sources ==
Sources

- Sir Joshua ReynoldsThe Age of Innocence ?1788 at tate.org.uk
