= George Smeeton =

English printer and compiler of biographical collections

George Smeeton (12 November 1780 Westminster, England – 24 August 1847 Peckham, Southwark, England) was an English printer and compiler of biographical collections.

== Life ==
Smeeton rose to the proprietorship of a printing business in the neighbourhood of St. Martin's-in-the-Fields in Westminster. He became a strong ally of James Caulfield, of Wells Street, off Oxford Street. He moved to the Old Bailey, and then to Tooley Street, Southwark, by 1828,

== Publications ==
Smeeton brought out Boxiana as a serial from 1812. He printed and published, in 1814, The Eccentric Magazine for Caulfield containing lives and portraits of misers, dwarfs, and idiots. In 1820 he issued, in two volumes, Reprints of Rare and Curious Tracts relating to English History, containing 16 seventeenth-century pamphlets, with reproductions of contemporary portraits and a few notes.

Following in Caulfield's footsteps, Smeeton issued in 1822 Biographia Curiosa; or Memoirs of Remarkable Characters of the Reign of George III, with their Portraits (London; with 39 portraits, and a plate of the Beggars' Opera at St. Giles). From 1825, he published four volumes of The Unique, a series of engraved portraits of eminent persons, with brief memoirs. In 1828 he issued Doings in London: or Day and Night Scenes of the Frauds, Frolics, Manners, and Depravities of the Metropolis, illustrated with designs engraved by George Wilmot Bonner after Isaac Robert Cruikshank. This is a medley based to some extent on Edward Ward's The London Spy and the compilations of Pierce Egan and Charles Molloy Westmacott.

== Notes ==
Attribution

This article incorporates text from a publication now in the public domain: Lee, Sidney, ed. (1897). "Smeeton, George". Dictionary of National Biography. Vol. 52. London: Smith, Elder & Co.
