= Joseph Grozer =

English artist and printmaker

Joseph Grozer (1755–1799) was an English artist and printmaker. He resided at No 8, Castle Street, Leicester Square (or Leicester Fields) (1792–4) and published some of his prints himself.

== Works ==
Grozer engraved in mezzotint, after Sir Joshua Reynolds, George Romney, and others. Among his earliest known engravings are The Young Shepherdess, published in 1784, and The Theory of Design, 1785, both after Reynolds. Other mezzotint engravings were:

- Master Braddyll, Frederick, Viscount Duncannon, Henrietta, Viscountess Duncannon, Hon. Frances Harris (with a dog), Lord Loughborough, and others, after Reynolds;
- James, Earl of Cardigan, Abraham Newland, after Romney;
- Morning, or the Benevolent Sportsman, Evening, or the Sportsman's Return, and others after George Morland;
- The Duke and Duchess of York, after Henry Singleton;
- Euhun Sang Lum Akao, a Chinese man, after Henri-Pierre Danloux, and many others.

Grozer worked occasionally in stipple, among these engravings being Sophia, Lady St. Asaph, after Reynolds and Sergeant Daniel McLeod, after William Redmore Bigg, and others. It was Grozer who gave the name The Age of Innocence to his stipple engraving of the work by Sir Joshua Reynolds, originally believed to have been called A Little Girl. The picture became a favourite of the public, and according to Martin Postle "the commercial face of childhood", being reproduced countless times in prints and ephemera of different kinds.

== Works ==
- The Fine Arts Museum of San Francisco has a mezzotint by Grozer titled

Saint John: I am the voice of one crying in the wilderness. Chapter 1, Verse 23

- Artprice lists six works by Grozer sold at auction since 1997.

== References and sources ==
Sources

- La Gravure en Angleterre au XVIIIe Siecle, by Andre Blum (1930)
- Two Notes on Etchings and Mezzotints: II. Joseph Grozer, by Campbell Dodgson (1928)
- A Select Collection of English Mezzotints Formed By the Late Anson W. Burchard, Esq. (1928)
- British Museum

Attribution

This article incorporates text from a publication now in the public domain: Stephen, Leslie; Lee, Sidney, eds. (1890). "Grozer, Joseph". Dictionary of National Biography. Vol. 23. London: Smith, Elder & Co.
