= Boxiana =

Boxiana is the title given to a series of volumes of prizefighting articles written by the English sportswriter and journalist Pierce Egan, and part-published by George Smeeton in the 1810s.

Egan wrote magazine articles about the bareknuckle forerunner of boxing, which at that time was conducted under the London Prize Ring rules, and was outlawed in England. A devoted follower of boxing, Egan called it "The Sweet Science of Bruising." Periodically he would gather his boxing articles in a bound volume and publish them under the title Boxiana; or Sketches of Ancient and Modern Pugilism. The first volume was published in 1813 (although the title page reads 1812, due to the arrangement, common at the time, where the book was sent to subscribers in installments before being released to the public.) Five more volumes followed, in 1818, 1821, 1824, 1828, and 1829. The fourth volume (1824) was by 'Jon Bee' (following a legal dispute between Egan and the publishers). The court granted Egan continued use of the Boxiana title provided that he also used the wording 'New Series'. Two volumes of Egan's New Series Boxiana were published in 1828-29.

Egan's writing was brought back to popular attention by the boxing articles published in The New Yorker from 1950–1964 by A.J. Liebling. Liebling referenced Egan frequently and named his own first collection of boxing articles The Sweet Science in Egan's honor. (The other Liebling collection is called A Neutral Corner).

Volumes of Boxiana are hard to find today, though the Folio Society issued a reprint of the first volume in 1976, and in 1998 Nicol Island Publishers of Toronto issued a reprint of the first volume and announced plans to reissue all five volumes. (As of February 2006, Nicol Island has published Volumes One, Two, and Three.)
