= Daniel Mendoza =

English bare-knuckle boxer (1764–1836)

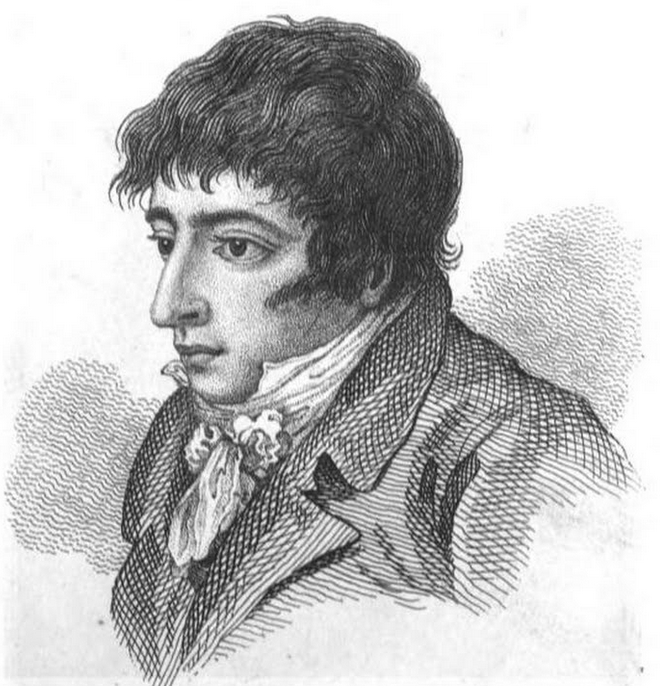

Personal information
- Nicknames: Mendoza the Jew; The Star of Israel
- Nationality: English
- Born: 5 July 1765 London, England
- Died: 3 September 1836 (aged 71) London, England
- Height: 5 ft 7 in (1.70 m)
- Weight: 160 lb (73 kg)

Boxing career
- Stance: Orthodox

Boxing record
- Total fights: 37
- Wins: 31
- Losses: 5
- Draws: 1

Daniel Mendoza (5 July 1765 (Note: Mendoza states his year of birth as 1764 in his memoirs, but synagogue records suggest 1765 is more likely, because he was circumcised on 12 July 1765.) – 3 September 1836) was an English bare-knuckle boxer and the first Jewish English heavyweight champion, who was a popular prizefighter in late 18th-century Britain. He played a significant role in advancing the scientific technique in boxing by publishing two books on the subject (The Art of Boxing and The Modern Art of Boxing) and by conducting frequent public exhibitions.

Mendoza was an inaugural inductee into The Ring magazine Hall of Fame in 1954, the International Jewish Sports Hall of Fame in 1981, and the International Boxing Hall of Fame in 1990. In 2017, he was inducted into the Bare Knuckle Boxing Hall of Fame.

== Early life and ancestry ==
Mendoza was born in the Whitechapel area of London on 5 July 1764, to Sephardic Jewish parents Abraham Aaron Mendoza and Esther Lopez.

By the time he was born, Jews had been allowed to settle in England for about one hundred years, having been readmitted officially by Cromwell in 1656. They were still regarded by many Londoners with a degree of suspicion and faced significant antisemitism. Mendoza's ancestors came from the Kingdom of Jaén (in present-day Andalusia, Spain); they had emigrated to the Netherlands, which had a policy of toleration, where his grandfather was born.

The family moved to London, with ancestors living there for a century before Mendoza's birth. Several sources wrote that some of his London ancestors from Spain had earlier concealed their Jewish identity and converted to Christianity, becoming Marranos. According to many genealogical websites, Mendoza's parents were and were believed to be artisans by trade. Jewish scholar Albert Hyamson wrote that Aaron Mendoza, a shochet who had written a book on his craft in 1773, was his grandfather.

Mendoza attended a Jewish school, Shaare Tikvah, where he was instructed in English grammar, writing and arithmetic, as well as Hebrew. He grew up in London's East End in poor surroundings and worked as a glass cutter, labourer, assistant to a green grocer, and actor before taking up boxing as a profession.

== Early career highlights 1780–90 ==
Mendoza's first fight occurred in 1780 when he was 16. At the time, he was working for a tea dealer in Aldgate. The fight was not a prize fight for a purse, but a contest to settle a dispute with a porter over payment for a consignment of tea. The porter had demanded twice the agreed price for the consignment and Mendoza said the porter behaved in a manner unfit for a gentleman. After much arguing between the porter and the proprietor of the tea dealership, the porter challenged the owner to settle the dispute by a duel with fists.

Believing the porter was cheating his frail employer, Mendoza accepted the challenge on his behalf. Richard Humphries acted as Mendoza's second. Humphries would later act as a manager for Mendoza, arranging training facilities and securing payment for fights. The duel with the porter took place in the street outside the tea dealership in a hastily constructed ring. The fight lasted for forty-five minutes, ending when the porter declared he was unable to continue. This victory brought a small measure of fame to Mendoza, as stories of the fight spread through the surrounding neighbourhoods and portrayed Mendoza as the talented whippersnapper who had not just beaten, but thrashed his larger opponent.

=== Bout with Harry the Coalheaver, 1784 ===
Turning professional at 18, Mendoza fought at Mile End in 1784 against Harry the Coalheaver. After 40 rounds, lasting 118 minutes, Mendoza brought the larger man into submission.

=== Bouts with Tom Tyne, 1785 and 1786 ===
Mendoza then fought Tom Tyne, a tailor from Bermondsey. The exact date of this fight is unclear. Mendoza himself claims 1783 but other events in the narrative of his autobiography suggest a date closer to 1786/7. Wheldon (2019) notes that a report in the Public Advertiser seems to set the date accurately at 7 November 1785. The report read as follows: 'Monday, a pitched battle was fought near Wanstead, between Mendoza, the noted fighting Jew, and a tailor, of the Borough, which after a contest of 40 minutes (during which time much real drubbing was given on both sides) was decided in favour of the tailor, to the no small disappointment and regret of the knowing ones'.

In July 1786 Mendoza fought a rematch against Tyne at Duppas Hill, Croydon, having dispatched a couple of minor fighters in the intervening eight months. The second bout versus Tyne resulted in victory for Mendoza in a fight lasting 27 rounds and almost an hour. Mendoza noted that in the second bout Tyne fought with 'uncommon shyness' and that 'several sporting gentlemen assembled on this occasion'.

=== Bout with Sam Martin, 1787 ===
After his fight with Sam Martin the Bath Butcher in Barnet on 17 April 1787, which Mendoza won in ten rounds and a total of 26 minutes, he was transported home followed by a cheering crowd who carried lighted torches and sang 'See the Conquering Hero Comes'. After the fight, the Prince of Wales, who would become King George IV, presented Mendoza with five hundred pounds, in addition to the five hundred pounds he had won in the match, and shook his hand in full view of the gallery. Mendoza used the money to open a boxing school in Capel Court. The recognition by royalty annoyed his second, occasional manager Richard Humphries, who became a rival and planned for a match, but it elevated the stature of Jews in London.

With the money he won from the Martin fight, Mendoza is believed to have married first cousin Esther Mendoza around 1789. They would have eleven children, whom Mendoza later struggled to support. Before he married, he promised Esther to quit boxing, but was unable to keep his promise.

=== Bouts with Richard Humphries, 1787–90 ===
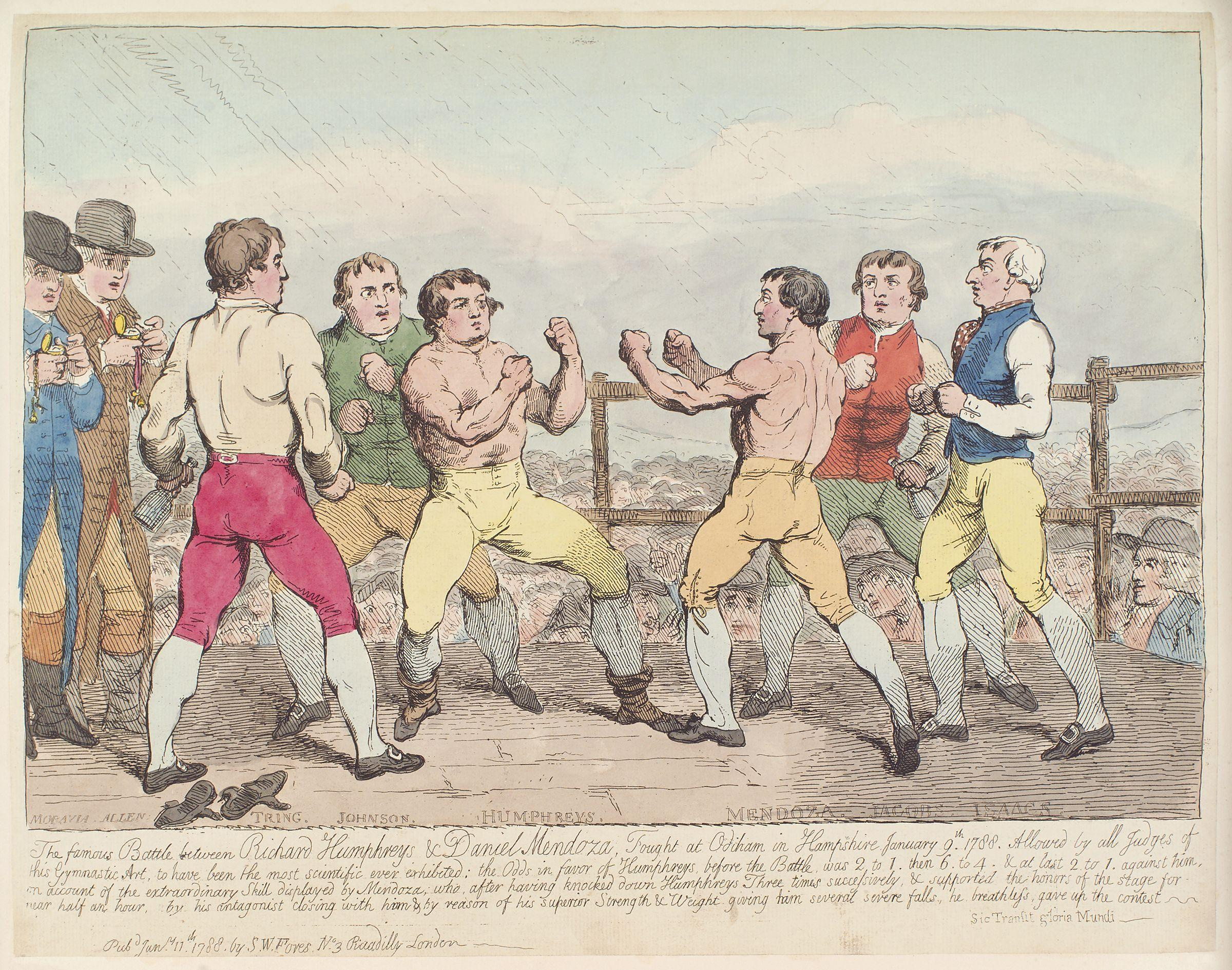
First fight between Humphreys and Mendoza, 9 September 1787

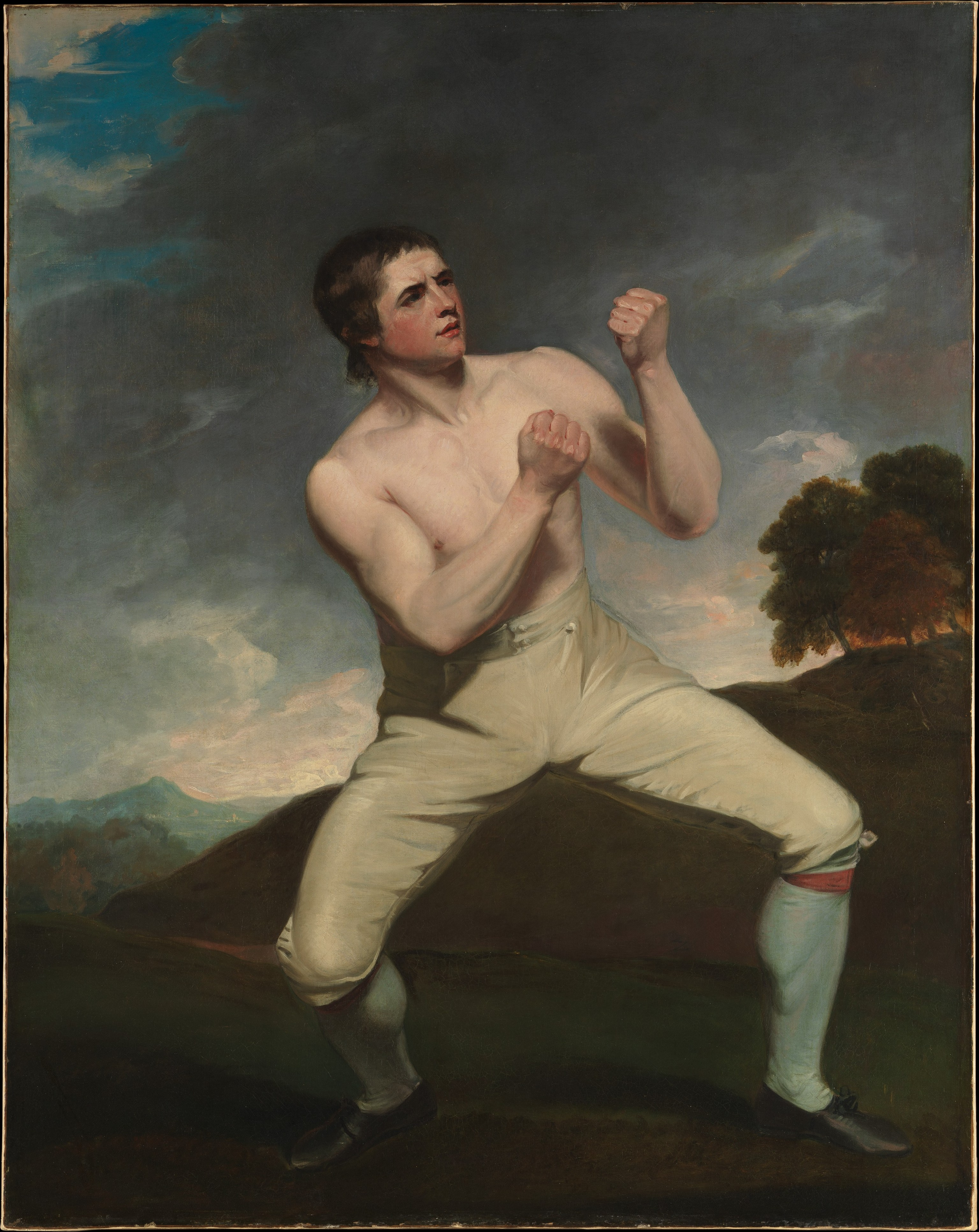
Humphries posed with guard up

The next phase of Mendoza's career was defined by a series of bouts with his former mentor and second Richard Humphries between 1787 and 1790. The first, and least known, of these took place on 9 September 1787; Mendoza lost in 29 minutes. This fight was not considered as important by historians, perhaps because Humphries dominated, or because there were fewer persons in attendance.

A second Mendoza–Humphries bout took place, after postponement, on a rainy 9 January 1788 in Odiham, Hampshire and was attended by 10,000 spectators.

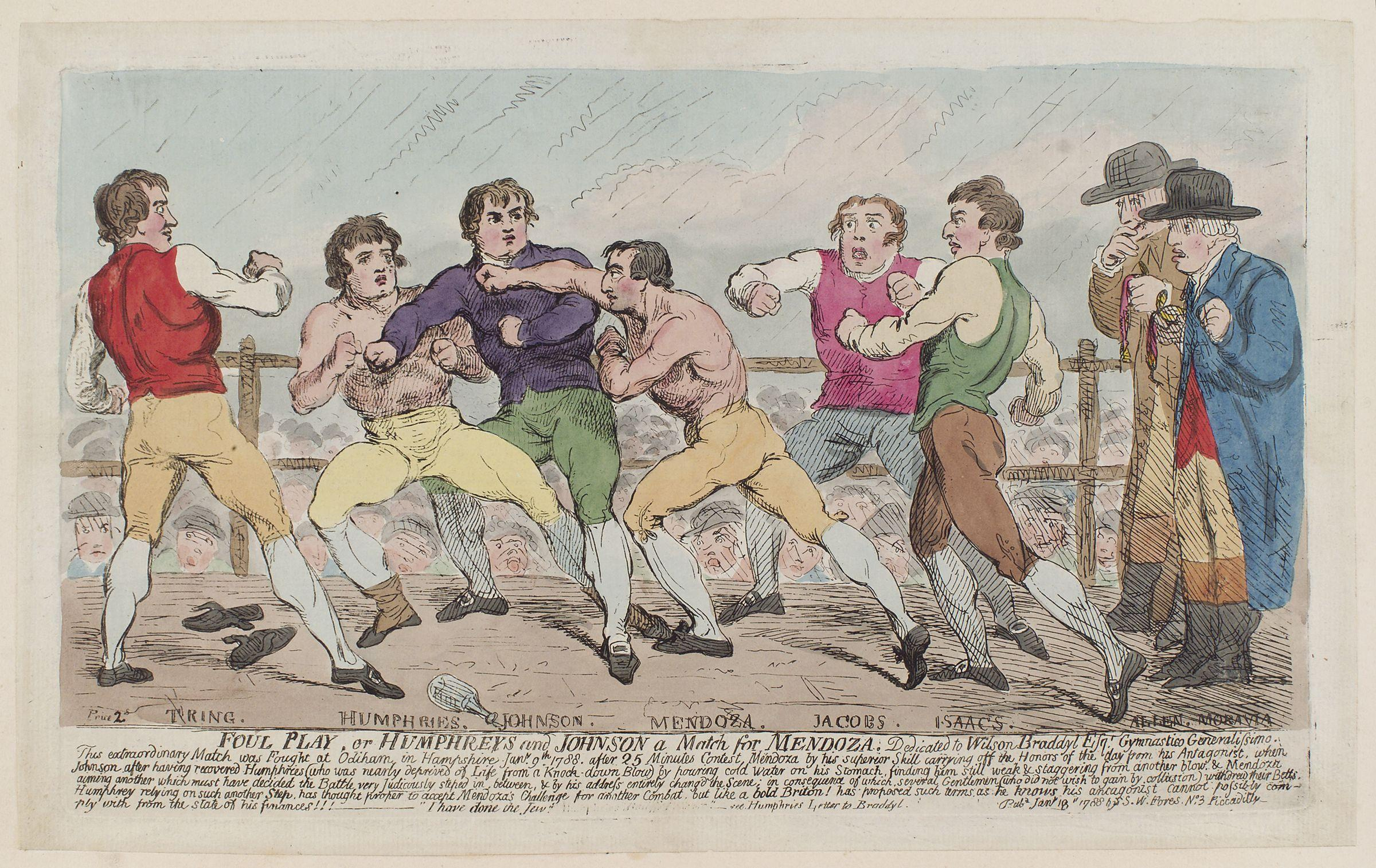
Second fight; Tom Johnson interferes. 9 January 1788

Included in the audience were the Prince of Wales and the Duke of York, who wagered 40,000 pounds on the match. Humphries was a 2–1 favourite to win, though Mendoza had his own followers and was heavily backed by the Jewish community.

The fight was disrupted from a foul called when Humphries' second, the reigning champion, Tom Johnson blocked a blow but, according to Mendoza's account, this did not end the fight. According to his own account, Mendoza slipped on the wet boards of the ring and badly sprained his ankle, preventing him from continuing, and requiring him to forfeit the bout.

At least seven English newspapers of the era, including London's Times and Chronicle, published articles on the Mendoza–Humphries bouts, and United States papers ran stories as well. In one newspaper article to advertise their meeting, Mendoza taunted, "Mr. Humphreys is afraid, he dares not meet me as a boxer ... though he has the advantages of strength and age, though a teacher of the art, he meanly shrinks from a public trial of that skill". Humphries replied Mendoza should make the same claim in the ring, and vowed to meet him.

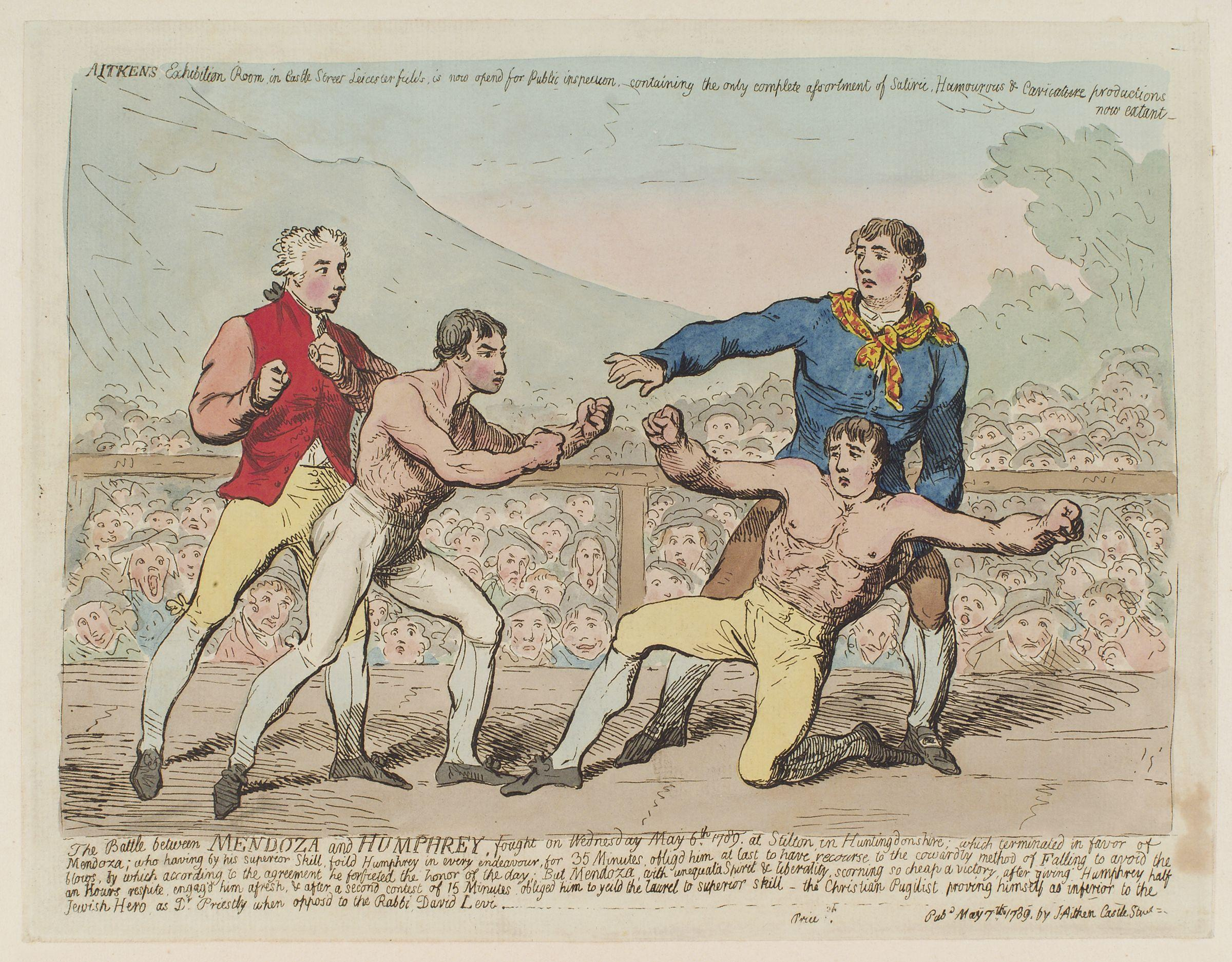
Third fight: Won on foul, round 65, Mendoza on left, 6 May 1789

In his third bout against Humphries on 6 May 1789 in Stilton, Huntingdonshire, Mendoza dominated and won on a foul in the 65th round when Humphries was believed to have dropped to the ground without being hit. Mendoza had trained for the bout at the Essex home of his principal Sir Thomas Apreece. The specially built arena had tiered seating and could accommodate up to 3,000 people, a more modest crowd than at his second bout. The battle commenced a little after one o'clock in the afternoon. The smaller crowd may have been due to Huntingdonshire being a long journey for many fans, ninety miles from London. It was clear early in the fight that Mendoza's hand and foot work were vastly superior to Humphries', though both men were accomplished scientific boxers and had studied each other's style.

Mendoza won his fourth and final bout with Humphries on 29 September 1790 in 72 rounds in Doncaster Recognised by many for his previous win, Mendoza was the 5–4 favourite, and he thoroughly thrashed his opponent, ten minutes into the bout. Pierce Egan, English boxing author of the period, noted that many in the crowd were behind Mendoza, and that the "humanity of Mendoza was conspicuous throughout the fight—often was it witnessed that Dan threw his arm when he might have put in a most tremendous blow upon his exhausted adversary".

== First fight versus Bill Warr ==
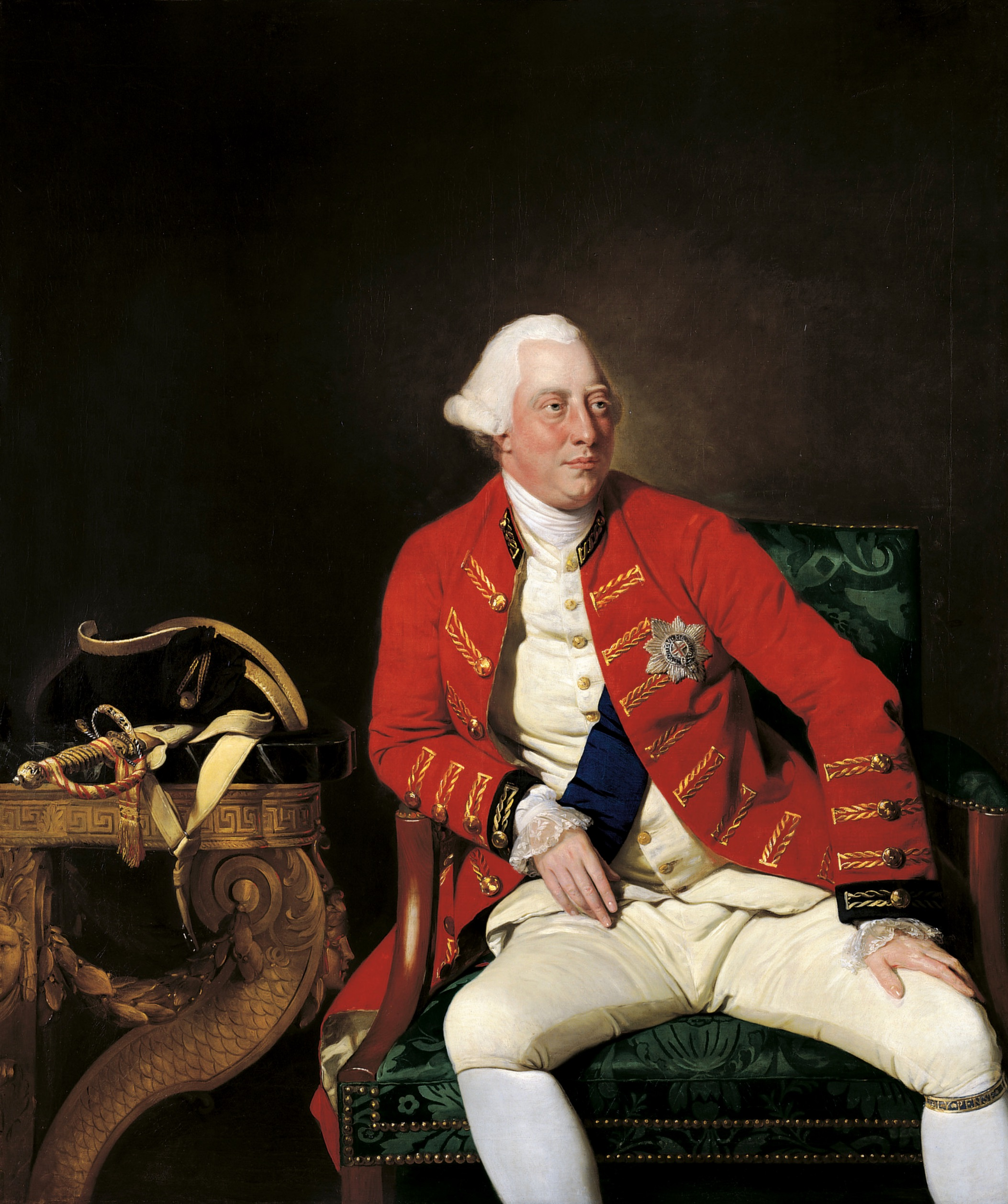
Portrait of George III by Johan Zoffany, 1771

On 14 May 1792, Mendoza fought a bout at Smitham Bottom, Croydon, against Bill Warr (or Ward) his former sparring-partner. This fight resulted in a victory for Mendoza in 23 rounds, 116 minutes. After his win against Warr, Mendoza is believed to have met with King George III at Windsor Castle. Poems and songs were written of Mendoza, he sat for portraits, and was asked to give boxing exhibitions at London's prestigious Covent Gardens. Mendoza was paid 50 English pounds, an impressive sum in 1790, for several of his boxing demonstrations at Covent Gardens, which he conducted as often as three times a week.

== Mendoza's style of boxing ==
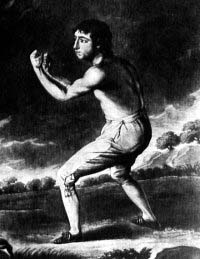
Mendoza posed with guard up

Pierce Egan recorded that 'Mendoza was considered one of the most elegant and scientific pugilists in the whole race of boxers. [...] He rose up like a phenomenon in the pugilistic hemisphere, and was a star of the first brilliancy for a considerable period'. The anonymous work Pancratia (1812) noted that 'In his manner there is more neatness than strength, and it has been said, more show than service; his blows are in general deficient in force, but given with astonishing quickness, and he is [agreed] to strike oftener, and stop more dexterously, than any other man.'

Other attributes considered typical of Mendoza's style were: 'stopping and returning with the same hand', and extensive use of the 'chopper' (a backhanded punch, often delivered with the same hand that had just been used to make a block). He was also noted for his ability in 'tiring out a man's strength [...] by acting on the defensive till the assault in turn could be practiced with success'. Mendoza was believed to have 'derived his primitive knowledge of boxing from the tuition of his elegant rival Humphreys; but he so rapidly improved upon the system of his master, as to remain several years without a rival'.

=== Mendoza as a teacher ===
Mendoza's contribution to the development of scientific technique came as much from his ability as a teacher as from his own personal boxing style. In 1789 he published two books, The Art of Boxing and The Modern Art of Boxing, and from 1790 onwards he frequently offered public exhibitions of pugilism in theatres, either in London or across the provinces. Mendoza also worked closely with a number of later pugilists, either as a trainer or as a second (i.e. cornerman in modern parlance). Egan noted that 'as a teacher [...], it might almost be said, that [Mendoza] was without a competitor, and turned out some excellent pupils.'

The influence of Mendoza's books is unclear. The Art of Boxing devotes just 28 pages to boxing technique, but a further 67 to documenting the ill-tempered correspondence that had passed between Mendoza and Humphreys. The Modern Art of Boxing (a slim 48-page tome) is described by Mendoza as 'a selection from different works on the same subject' (it contains material taken directly from, for example, Godfrey's 1747 treatise on self-defence). Contained in both of these works are Mendoza's 'Six Lessons' (described as being 'for the use of his scholars'). These consist of exercises whereby the master makes various attacks and the student is told how to defend against them. The 'Six Lessons' can be seen as an expression of Mendoza's style as described above, with much concentration on defensive technique and counter-attack.

== Later career 1793–95 ==
Though he remained an admired and heroic figure, Mendoza's decline in popular support may have partly been due to public knowledge of several crimes he committed, which he omitted from his memoirs. He may have been deported early in his life for robbery, was undoubtedly accused of fraud in a well-publicised Old Bailey trial in October 1793, and was found guilty in a London trial of viciously assaulting a woman, Rachel Joel, for insulting his wife in 1795.

After a stay in a debtors' prison, he resumed training and defeated Bill Warr again on 12 November 1794, outclassing him in only seventeen minutes at Bexley Common. At around this time Mendoza was employed as a recruiting Sargent.

=== Bout against John Jackson, 1795 ===
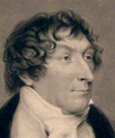
John Jackson

On 15 April 1795, Mendoza fought "Gentleman" John Jackson on a stage at Hornchurch in Essex. At a muscular twenty-six, Jackson was five years younger than Mendoza's thirty-one, four inches (10 cm) taller, and 42 pounds (19 kg) heavier. Two hundred guineas, or a little over two hundred British pounds, were laid on each side, and the future King William IV was among the audience. The bout was only Jackson's third professional fight and the betting was recorded by Pierce Egan as having been in favour of Mendoza. Jackson, however, won in nine rounds, paving the way to victory by muscling Mendoza into the corner of the ring, grabbing his hair and pummeling his head with uppercuts using his free hand. Mendoza managed to come back up to scratch after this, but was soon knocked out. Jackson beat him into submission by the end of the ninth round. Mendoza asked for a foul for the hair pulling, but it was ruled to be legal at the time. Many pugilists, such as James Figg and Jack Broughton, shaved their heads to avoid the possibility of this, until hair-pulling was eventually banned in boxing. Mendoza retired after his loss, and though he attempted boxing comebacks, he never again enjoyed the same-size audiences or received large purses. Although Mendoza continued sparring tours well into the nineteenth century, 1795 marked the beginning of a steep decline in his popularity and for the most part, his income. He very rarely appeared in the London newspapers after this period, and had lost respect with much of the public.

In 1799, Mendoza contracted a debt and ended in Carlisle Prison. Though he was bailed out by friends in the Freemasons, he later served another six months. With great connections, though a convict, he was later appointed Sheriff's Assistant to the County of Middlesex in 1806, though he would have to evade prison again in later life due to mounting debts.

=== Return to boxing vs Harry Lee, 1806 ===
==== Victory over Harry Lee ====
On 21 March 1806, at Grinstead Green, Mendoza returned to the ring and defeated the taller Harry Lee in 53 rounds. Based on his previous reputation, Mendoza was a 3–1 favourite in the betting. The stakes were 50 guineas a side. During this period Mendoza worked as the landlord of the "Admiral Nelson" public house in Whitechapel. He turned down a number of offers for re-matches and in 1807 wrote a letter to The Times of London in which he said he was devoting himself chiefly to teaching the art of boxing.

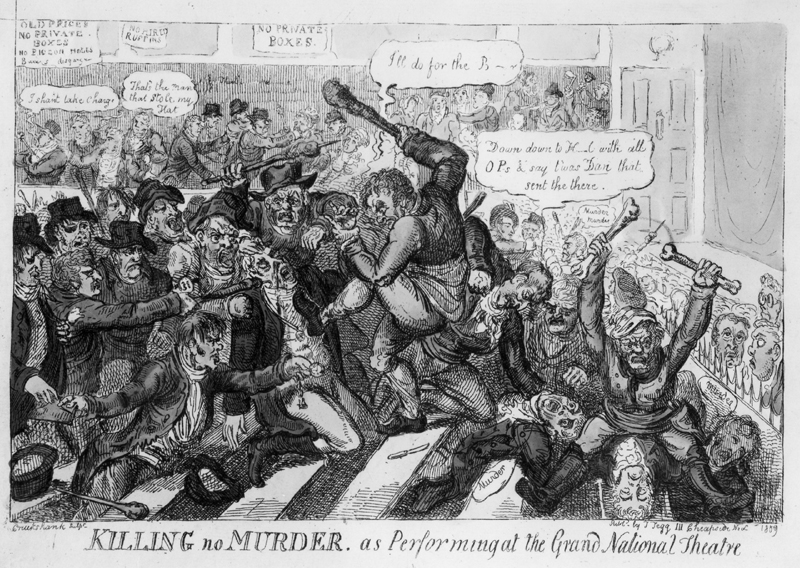
Cartoon of riots, Mendoza in centre with stick

In 1809 Mendoza and some associates were hired by the theatre manager John Philip Kemble of Covent Gardens in an attempt to suppress the Old Price Riots. The riots lasted three months and became a violent uprising against the increase in prices at the new theatre after the old theatre had burnt down. The resulting poor publicity probably cost Mendoza much of his remaining popular support, as he was seen to be fighting on the side of the privileged. The anger against the raising of the prices also sparked additional antisemitism in London and apparently, judging by the press accounts, against Mendoza himself.

He published his third book, the autobiographical Memoirs of the Life of Daniel Mendoza, in 1816.

Though not well documented, Mendoza went on several exhibition tours through the British Isles, the most successful being those made in the summer of 1819.

=== Final loss and death, 1836 ===
He made his last public appearance as a boxer on 4 July 1820, one day short of his 56th birthday, at Banstead Downs in a grudge match against former boxer Thomas Owen, at that point a London innkeeper and five years younger than Mendoza. Mendoza had not fought for 14 years. In need of money, he made a questionable choice, and was defeated after 12 rounds.

According to several sources, he continued his work as an inn keeper and landlord, likely at the Admiral Nelson, in the later years of his life, and just before his death.

He died on 3 September 1836 at the age of 72, reportedly at his home in Horseshoe Alley on London's Petticoat Lane, leaving his wife Esther and family of eleven in poverty. He was initially buried in the Nuevo Sephardic Cemetery, a Jewish Cemetery near Mile End, now part of the campus of Queen Mary University of London and later reburied in Brentwood Jewish Cemetery in Essex.

Pierce Egan, the author of Boxiana, a boxing history of the period, said of Mendoza that he was "a complete artist" and "a star of the first brilliancy." On the subject of race prejudice, Egan wrote, "In spite of his prejudice, he (the Christian) was compelled to exclaim—Mendoza was a pugilist of no ordinary merit." Egan further wrote "No pugilist whatever, since the time of Broughton (or even Broughton himself), has ever so completely elucidated, or promulgated, the principles of boxing as Daniel Mendoza". (Broughton was the first Englishman to write rules for the sport of boxing.)

=== Claim to the English Championship ===
Most modern sources describe Mendoza as having been English Prizefighting Champion from 1792 (when he defeated Bill Warr at Smitham Bottom) to 1795 (when he lost to John Jackson at Hornchurch). This span includes a further fight against Warr in 1794. The origin of this claim to the championship would appear to be Henning's very unreliable 1902 book Fights for the Championship which includes much text invented by the author. Sources from the late 18th and early 19th centuries, however, seem to be unanimous in not describing Mendoza as champion.

Various contemporary newspaper accounts of Mendoza's fights in 1792, 1794 and 1795 survive, including those in the Evening Mail, the Oracle and in the Sporting Magazine. These reports do not describe the fights as having been for the championship, nor do they mention Mendoza as having been champion. Similarly, the Sporting Magazine, essentially the journal of record for sporting events in this era, refers to Mendoza on several other occasions between 1792 and 1795, but never describes him as champion.

Early 19th century works such as Pancratia (1812) and Boxiana (1813) also cover these fights without making any reference to the championship—and the lengthy chapter on Mendoza in Boxiana never refers to him having been champion (whereas the chapters on established champions such as Tom Johnson, Ben Brain and Jem Belcher make their statuses clear on multiple occasions). Most tellingly, in his own autobiography Mendoza makes no reference to these three fights having been for the championship and at no point claims to have been English Champion.

According to Pierce Egan's authoritative Boxiana (1813), Ben Brain continued to be recognised as champion until his death in 1794. The championship then appears to have remained vacant until the advent of Jem Belcher in 1800, who is the next fighter to be described as Champion of England in the early prizefighting sources.

=== Halls of Fame ===
- In 1954 Mendoza was inducted into the inaugural class of The Ring magazine Hall of Fame (Boxing Hall of Fame).
- Mendoza was inducted into the inaugural class of the International Jewish Sports Hall of Fame in 1981.
- In 1990 he was inducted into the inaugural class of the International Boxing Hall of Fame.
- In 2017, Mendoza was inducted into the Bare Knuckle Boxing Hall of Fame.

== Legacy ==
=== In popular culture ===
- In 1788 and 1789, James Gillray produced several cartoons of Mendoza.
- Arthur Conan Doyle's 1896 historical novel Rodney Stone included Mendoza, described as having left behind him "a reputation for elegance and perfect science which has, to this day, never been exceeded."
- Mendoza appears as a character in the 1934 movie The Scarlet Pimpernel at approximately the 40-minute mark.
- Mendoza appears as a character in the 1942 British drama The Young Mr. Pitt.
- In James Joyce's 1922 novel Ulysses, the protagonist Leopold Bloom mentions "Mendoza (pugilist)" in a list of "anapocryphal illustrious sons of the law and children of a selected or rejected race" along with "Felix Bartholdy Mendelssohn (composer), Baruch Spinoza (philosopher) ... [and] Ferdinand Lassalle (reformer, duellist)."
- In 1970, cartoon artist Ted Rawlings illustrated "Mendoza The Great", one of the anthology stories featured in The Victor comics.
- In American cartoonist Will Eisner's 2003 graphic novel Fagin the Jew, a young Fagin and his father witness Mendoza's fight against Richard Humphries, on which they place a bet in favor of Mendoza.
- In 2009, Randy Cohen debuted a play about Mendoza, titled The Punishing Blow.
- In 2013, writer Ronald Schechter and illustrator Liz Clarke published Mendoza the Jew: Boxing, Manliness, and Nationalism, A Graphic History.

=== Relatives ===
- The English actor Peter Sellers was Mendoza's first cousin four times removed, and hung portraits of the boxer in the backgrounds of several of his films, one being seen above his bed in A Shot in the Dark.
- Australian writer David Malouf was a direct descendant of Mendoza.

=== Plaques ===
- In September 2008, a commemorative plaque to Dan Mendoza (made by Louise Soloway) was unveiled in London by Sir Henry Cooper. It hangs on the wall of the main library of Queen Mary University of London, adjacent to the student cafeteria.
- His former home on Paradise Row in Bethnal Green is marked by a blue plaque.

== See also ==
- List of select Jewish boxers
