= Benjamin Brain =

English bareknuckle prizefighter (1753–1794)

Personal information
- Nickname: Big Ben
- Nationality: British
- Born: Benjamin Bryan; 1753 Bristol
- Died: 8 April 1794 (aged 40–41) London, England
- Height: 5 ft 7 in (1.70 m)
- Weight: 160 lb (73 kg)

Boxing career

Benjamin "Big Ben" Brain (1753 – 8 April 1794) was a bareknuckle prizefighter who took the championship of all England in 1791 against the reigning champion Tom Johnson.

A collier by trade, his fighting career spanned twenty years.

== Early life and boxing career ==
Brain was born in Bristol, England, in 1753. His surname was "Bryan" or "Brian": later in life this was sometimes corrupted into "Bryant" and also "Brain".

Prior to moving to London in 1774 in order to work as a coal porter at a wharf he had already defeated Jack Clayton, the champion of Kingswood, Bristol. and also a fighter called Harris.

His career as a professional started on 31 October 1786 at Long Fields, when he fought John Boone, who was known as "The Fighting Grenadier". Toughs broke into the ring and ganged up on Brain. In the resulting melée, Brain suffered a beating that almost closed one of his eyes. When order was restored and a surgeon had lanced the swelling around the eye, he resumed fighting and within thirty minutes had forced Boone to quit in defeat.

== Cancellation of first bout with English champion Tom Johnson, 1789 ==
After soundly defeating William Corbally in 20 minutes on 31 December 1788 in Navestock, he finally received a scheduled contract to fight the English champion, Tom Johnson for a prize of £500 the following year. When Brain fell ill and cancelled the bout, he forfeited the £100 he had put up for the fight. Later in that year he was well enough to fight Jacombs at Banbury, winning in 36 rounds.

In 1790 his 100 guinea fight against Bill Hooper at Newbury turned into a farce. Hooper became fearful after Brain's first successful hit on him and resorted to tactics such as falling over and spitting water in his face in order to distract him. The fight lasted over three hours and 180 rounds before being declared a draw due to the darkness of evening setting in. Hooper had fallen 133 times during the fight.

== Retaining English championship against Tom Johnson, 1791 ==
Brain then got another opportunity to fight Tom Johnson on 17 January 1791, at Wrotham in Kent. He received 500 guineas by the Duke of Hamilton for the bout. The fight was a brutal but short-lived affair: despite being a 7–4 favourite, Johnson was incapacitated after 21 minutes, after he broke a finger by hitting a rail that surrounded the ring. Nonetheless, Brain was winning prior to the injury, and was allowed to retain his claim to the championship with his eighteen-round win, in twenty-one minutes.

== Declining health and eventual death ==
From 1792 onwards Brain appears to have been in poor health and unable to compete as a prizefighter. There were attempts to arrange a fight against Isaac Perrins but these came to nothing. Until 1794 Brain made his living by sparring and acting as a second to other fighters.

On 24 February 1794, he was scheduled to fight William Wood. The fight did not take place and Brain later died of a "scirrhous liver" on 8 April at his house on Gray's Inn Road, London. He was buried at St. Sepulchre's Church, London, and his funeral was attended by four fighters: William Wood, Tom Johnson, Bill Warr and John Symonds. The epitaph on his headstone reads:

Farewell, ye honors of my brow,
Victorious wreaths, farewell!
One blow from Death has laid me low
By whom such brave ones fell.
Yet bravely, I'll dispute the prize,
Nor yield, though out of breath;
Tis not a fall – I yet shall rise,
And conquer even Death.

Some recent sources describe Brain as having possibly retired in 1792 due to ill health. The early boxing writer Pierce Egan, however, wrote in 1813's Boxiana that Brain remained the recognised champion until his death in 1794. This would appear to be consistent with fights having been organised against both Perrins and Wood in the period 1792–1794.

Achievements
Preceded by Tom Johnson	All England Heavyweight Bare-knuckle Boxing Champion; 17 January 1791	Succeeded by James Belcher
