= 1850 in sports =

1850 in sports describes the year's events in world sport.

== Athletics ==
Events

- 22–23 October — William Penny Brookes, a local doctor, organises the first Wenlock Olympian Games in England. These later inspire Pierre, Baron de Coubertin to establish the international Olympian games that continue to this day.
- November — Undergraduates at Exeter College in the University of Oxford arrange a "foot grind" (a cross-country steeplechase), the first organised university athletic event in Britain.

== Boxing ==
Events

- 5 June — William "Bendigo" Thompson defends his English Championship against Tom Paddock at Mildenhall. After winning the bout on the disqualification of Paddock after 49 rounds, Thompson announces his retirement from the ring.
- 17 December — Tom Paddock fights William Perry at Woking Common. After 27 rounds, Paddock is disqualified after striking Perry on the neck while Perry was walking to his corner. Perry claims the vacant English Championship.
- American champion Tom Hyer challenges Perry to what would be a world title fight but Perry does not respond.

== Cricket ==
Events

- Re-emergence of Middlesex as a county team, largely through the interest of the Walker family that will eventually found the present Middlesex County Cricket Club

England

- Most runs – John Wisden 374 @ 18.70 (HS 100)
- Most wickets – John Wisden 103 @ 14.07 (BB 10–?)

== Horse racing ==
England

- Grand National – Abd-El-Kader
- 1,000 Guineas Stakes – Lady Orford
- 2,000 Guineas Stakes – Pitsford
- The Derby – Voltigeur
- The Oaks – Rhedycina
- St. Leger Stakes – Voltigeur

== Rowing ==
The Boat Race

- The Oxford and Cambridge Boat Race is not held this year
