= 1853 in sports =

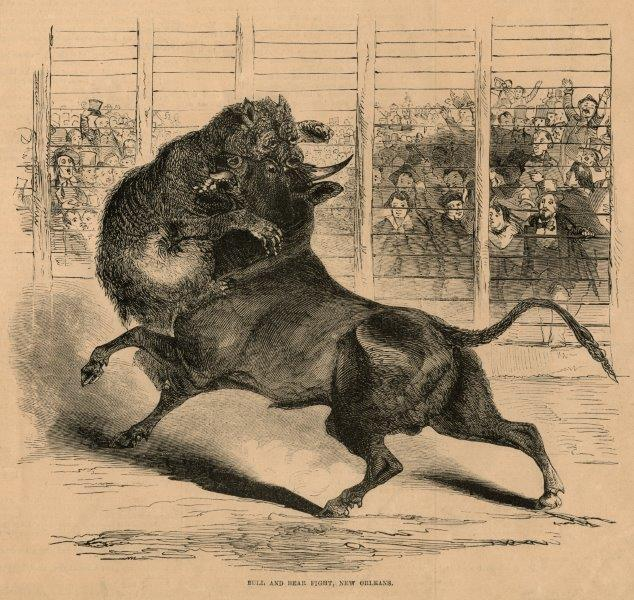
Spectators watch a bull and bear fight in New Orleans, 1853.

1853 in sports describes the year's events in world sport.

== Baseball ==
Events

- The New York Sunday Mercury publishes a box score for a Knickerbockers–Gothams baseball match, reprinted by the Clipper a few days later

== Boxing ==
Events

- 18 April — English champion Harry Broome defeats Henry Orme in the 31st round at Brandon to retain his title.
- August — a scheduled bout between Broome and former champion William Perry does not come off; Broome has to pay forfeit and Perry claims the title, but his claim is not recognised and Broome retains the English Championship until 1856.
- 12 October — Yankee Sullivan and John Morrissey meet to decide the Heavyweight Championship of America at Boston Corners, New York. According to reports, Morrissey is "badly beaten" but Sullivan leaves the ring after the 37th round and ignores the call of "time". As a result, the referee awards the fight to Morrissey, who holds the American Championship until 1859. Sullivan does not fight again but is subsequently arrested in San Francisco and sent to jail.
- Publication of the Revised London Prize Ring rules

== Cricket ==
Events

England

- Most runs – Jemmy Dean 372 @ 12.82 (HS 62)
- Most wickets – James Grundy 87 @ 10.04 (BB 8–?)

== Horse racing ==
- West Australian wins the English Triple Crown with a clean sweep of the 2000 Guineas, the Derby and the St Leger

England

- Grand National – Peter Simple (for the second time, having previously won in 1849)
- 1,000 Guineas Stakes – Mentmore Lass
- 2,000 Guineas Stakes – West Australian
- The Derby – West Australian
- The Oaks – Catherine Hayes
- St. Leger Stakes – West Australian

== Rowing ==
The Boat Race

- The Oxford and Cambridge Boat Race is not held this year
