= 1855 in sports =

1855 in sports describes the year's events in world sport.

== Baseball ==
Events

- The established Knickerbockers, Gothams, and Eagles from New York (Manhattan) play three matches round-robin in June. With the Empires, a local newcomer, they play five matches in September and October, a round-robin less one match.
- A few clubs from outside New York (Manhattan) play their first matches in the fall. One from Brooklyn is the Atlantic Base Ball Club or simply "Atlantic", soon to be the first recurring winner or "dynasty".

== Boxing ==
Events

- John Morrissey retains the Championship of America but there is no record of any fights involving him in 1855.
- 20 February and 12 March — English Champion Harry Broome twice fails to honour scheduled bouts against Tom Paddock but continues to be recognised as the champion.
- 25 February — William Poole is shot dead in New York by supporters of John Morrissey.
- 26 June — Paddock keeps up the pressure on Broome by winning a return bout with Aaron Jones in 61 rounds at Mildenhall.

== Cricket ==
Events

- 30 April — Bramall Lane stadium in Sheffield opens as a cricket ground and stages a match between two local teams. It is first used by Sheffield Cricket Club (aka Yorkshire) in August for a first-class match against Sussex.

England

- Most runs – John Wisden 422 @ 28.13 (HS 148)
- Most wickets – Jemmy Dean 98 @ 11.47 (BB 8–38)

== Horse racing ==
England

- Grand National – Wanderer
- 1,000 Guineas Stakes – Habena
- 2,000 Guineas Stakes – Lord of the Isles
- The Derby – Wild Dayrell
- The Oaks – Marchioness
- St. Leger Stakes – Saucebox

== Ice hockey ==
Events

- It is about this time that pucks are introduced to the game in Canada in place of balls

== Rowing ==
The Boat Race

- The Oxford and Cambridge Boat Race is not held this year.

Other

- 21 July — Harvard wins the second Harvard–Yale Regatta by a 1:38 margin on the Connecticut River in Springfield, Massachusetts. With the first in 1852 and the third in 1859, at three different sites, the one-race "regatta" is an occasional rather than a traditional or an established event.
