= Magdalen Hill Cemetery =

Cemetery in Hampshire, England

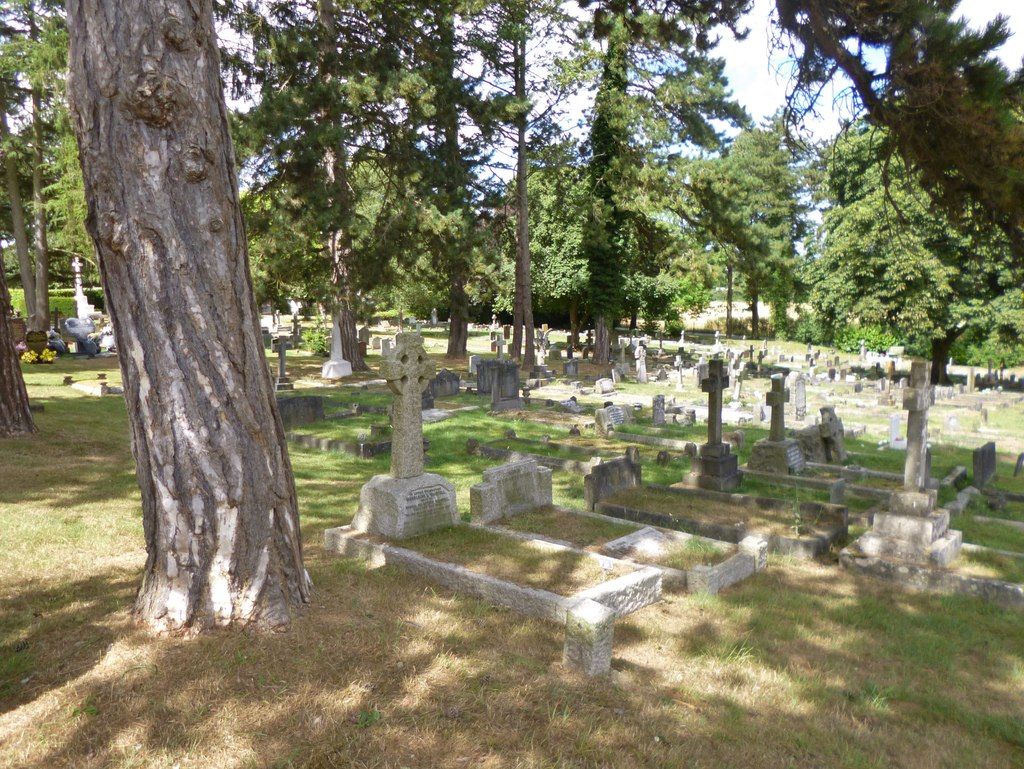
- Interactive map of Magdalen Hill Cemetery

Details
- Location: Magdalen Hill Down, Chilcomb, Hampshire, UK
- Coordinates: 51°03′40″N 1°16′5″W

National Register of Historic Parks and Gardens
- Official name: Magdalen Hill Cemetery
- Designated: 18 February 2003
- Reference no.: 1000310

Magdalen Hill Cemetery, also known as Morn Hill Cemetery, is a cemetery principally serving the burial requirements of the unparished area of the city of Winchester but located on Magdalen Hill Down in the adjoining civil parish of Chilcomb. It is owned and managed by Winchester City Council and is a Grade II listed Historic Park and Garden.

== History ==
Up until the early years of the 20th century, Winchester's principal burial ground was the privately run West Hill Cemetery to the west of the city centre. However, by 1906 this was almost full and in financial difficulties. The Winchester City Burial Board were tasked with coming up with a site for a new cemetery, and a 20 acres (8.1 ha) site at the eastern end of Magdalen Hill Down was chosen. The site lay outside the then boundaries of the city of Winchester, and was owned by the Ecclesiastical Commissioners. After acquisition of the land and several iterations of proposed layout, the cemetery was opened at the end of 1914.

During the First World War, the area around Magdalen Hill Down was occupied by an extensive military camp. This was largely used by members of the American Expeditionary Forces, and over 500 American servicemen were interred in the cemetery. However most of these were removed from the cemetery and returned to the United States after the end of the war. The Commonwealth War Graves Commission still tends 37 First World War burials in the cemetery, together with 65 from the Second World War.

Initially only the northern section of the site was laid-out and used, but after 1932 the burials were extended into the southern section. in 1974, the then city council merged with adjoining rural areas to create the City of Winchester, covering a much larger area than the traditional city boundaries. However it was agreed that, in the rural areas, burials would continue to be a parish responsibility, and that Magdalen Hill Cemetery would serve only the unparished original city area. In 2015, planning permission was granted to extend the cemetery on land acquired to the east of the existing cemetery, and the resulting extension was consecrated in 2017.
