= Defoe (character) =

Comics character

Titus Defoe
- Cover of 2000AD prog. 1589 (Jun 2008), art by Leigh Gallagher

Character information
- First appearance: 2000 AD #1540 (2007)
- Created by: Pat Mills; Leigh Gallagher

In-story information
- Full name: Titus Defoe
- Team affiliations: Sir Isaac Newton; Jack Ketch; Fear-The-Lord Jones; Robert Hooke

Publication information
- Publisher: Rebellion Developments
- Schedule: Weekly
- Formats: Original material for the series has been published as a strip in the comics anthology(s) 2000AD.
- Genre: Historical
- Publication date: June 2007 – present

Creative team
- Writer(s): Pat Mills
- Artist(s): Leigh Gallagher; Colin MacNeil; Stewart K. Moore
- Letterer(s): Ellie De Ville; Annie Parkhouse
- Editor(s): Tharg (Matt Smith)

Reprints
- Collected editions
- Defoe: 1666: ISBN 1-906735-10-7

Titus Defoe is a comics character in an eponymous story published in the British science fiction anthology 2000 AD. He was created by writer Pat Mills and artist Leigh Gallagher and first appeared in prog 1540, cover date 6 June 2007.

Defoe is a zombie hunter in an alternative 17th Century London overrun by plagues of zombies after a comet struck England in 1666. Defoe and his companions keep the undead plagues at bay using weapons devised by the likes of Sir Isaac Newton and Robert Hooke.

== Characters ==
=== The King's Men ===
- Titus Defoe – Zombie Hunter General
- Fear-The-Lord Jones – An earnest young reporter who befriended Defoe.
- Sir Isaac Newton
- Robert Hooke
- If-Christ-Had-Not-Died-For-Thee-Thou-Wouldst-Be-Damned Jones – Brother of Fear-The-Lord, and a British espionage agent.
- Sir Joseph Williamson – 'Provost', Damned's spymaster and head of the Secret Service
- Gabriel Grubb – Isaac Newton's dogsbody and former chief warden of Bedlam
- Aphra Behn – Poet, writer, British espionage agent and sometime lover of Damned Jones
- The Vizards – A group of young men and women with aetheric powers of flight and strength, their identities a secret – but believed to include Judge Jeffreys and Nell Gwynn. Mortal enemies of the Diabolonians

=== The Dirty Dozenne ===
The Crown's zombie slayers:

- Mister Bodie – Aether marine, veteran of Medway and Lowestoft and former pressganger
- Martha Hopkins – Witchfinder, widow of Matthew Hopkins and second in command of the Brethren
- Nathaniel Strange – A Winged Hussar, formerly a road knight
- Frenchy – Henri Sanson, Monsieur the Connoisseur, a French cannibal
- She-Napper - A former brothel madam
- Captain Queernabs - New Model Army veteran
- Blueskin Blake
- Russia Bob

Former members –

- Mungo Gallowgrass – Anatomist and necrophiliac
- The Spiriter – Silas Scrimgeour, child-catcher – see The Undead
- The Tomb Rat – Ezreel Tonge, ranter, lives in a tomb and frequently speaks in tongues.
- Solomon Eagle – A phlogiston weapon specialist and New Model Army veteran.
- The Butcher – Josiah Creely, the 'Butcher of Soho'
- Jack Ketch – The infamous hangman
- The Bishop – The Reverend Theophilus Forrest, former Bishop of the Cells at Newgate Prison
- Tomazine Scarlet – 'The Sea Wolf'. Irish Pirate, lover of Charles Vane, spared the gallows after pleading her belly

=== The Undead ===
- Mene Tekel, later revealed as infamous occultist Johann Faust – The power behind the undead hordes
- La Voisin – Countess Madalena Von Konigsberg, also known as 'Prussian Blue'. Mene Tekel's second in command, a powerful sorceress, and self-styled 'Queen of the zombies'
- Oliver Cromwell – Returned from the dead and leagued with the zombies to revenge himself on the Restoration
- Baroque – La Voisin's part-clockwork bodyguard, veteran of the Battle of Magdeburg
- Jack O'Bite – Once Titus' best friend, now a Lieutenant of the zombie hordes
- The Diabolonians – Twelve highly intelligent 'super zombies', mortal enemies of the Vizards.
- The Spiriter – Silas Scrimgeour, formerly of the Brethren of the Night, killed by the Diabolonians and resurrected by La Voisin.
- Tom Cox - A hanged highwayman.

== Plot ==
During the Civil War Titus Defoe fought as a Roundhead for the Parliamentary forces, seeing action at the battle of Naseby, where his friend Jack received horrific face wounds. A committed Leveller, Defoe and his friends were betrayed by Cromwell's Republic after the war and executed or exiled. Disillusioned by Cromwell's actions, Defoe retired from military life and worked a sedan chair around the streets of London with Jack until he had saved enough money to buy a cottage in Colchester with his young wife, where they soon had several children. This idyll was shattered in 1666 when a meteor passed over the Southeast of the country, starting the Great Fire and raising the dead from the ashes. The great and good of society had begun receiving visits in their dreams from beings who claimed to be angels for some years before the disaster, and had been forewarned of the imminent catastrophe. The poor were not so lucky, and were left to their fate. Defoe's wife and children lost their lives to the zombie hordes. Defoe joined the employ of the lately restored King as a zombie hunter, dedicated to ending the undead scourge and bringing order back to the streets of London.

=== 1666 ===
Called to what seemed a routine zombie outbreak, Defoe first re-encountered his former friend Jack, now Jack O' Bite, an undead ghoul and zombie lieutenant. Shadowed, somewhat to his chagrin, by intrepid young reporter Fear-the-Lord Jones, Defoe repelled a zombie outbreak at the ruin of St Paul's Cathedral in concert with fellow zombie hunter Jack Ketch, former hangman, where the trio were saved by the timely arrival of a flying machine. The machine was manned by Isaac Newton and Robert Hooke who, along with Boyle and other Natural Philosophers of the Invisible College, were spearheading the fight against the zombies with new weapons and new technologies – part of the ongoing angelically inspired Renaissance. Defoe informed Newton of his encounter with Jack O' Bite, which seemed to suggest that some marshalling intelligence was controlling the undead hordes. This intelligence was soon revealed; the severed head of Oliver Cromwell. Cromwell's head led an attack on the King, but was eventually frustrated by Defoe and Newton, who drove back the zombie hordes. A gloating Jack O' Bite revealed to Titus that it was he who was responsible for the death of his wife and child, but the swirl of battle forced the two apart before an enraged Defoe could slay his former friend. Defoe slew Cromwell for a second time, thus laying to rest at least some of the ghosts of his past, and Newton decreed Defoe England's new Zombie Hunter General.

=== Brethren of the Night ===
Now head of an elite team of specialist zombie hunters known as the Dirty Dozenne, or Brethren of the Night, Defoe was leading a pro-active campaign of eradication of zombie nests as part of the ongoing reclamation of those parts of London destroyed by the 1666 comet. It was at the ruins of the former Royal Exchange that they encountered Gonoph Bendigo, a dung collector and former bare-knuckle fighter who had tasked his two young apprentices to loot the tunnels below the ruins of any forgotten valuables. The boys woke the sleeping evil in the tunnels and released a horde of fire zombies, who slew both the boys and Bendigo.

Fear-the-Lord Jones, meanwhile, had tracked La Voisin to Ipswich and learnt her true identity, only to be confronted and shot by her. Embarking on a frantic ride back to London, a mortally wounded Fear staggered to Whitehall to find his brother If-Christ-Had-Not-Died-For-Thee-Thou-Wouldst-Be-Damned Jones, an agent in the British Secret Service. Managing to impart his information before he died, Damned swore to avenge his brother and track down La Voisin.

Unaware of Fear's fate, Defoe was meanwhile making inquiries among the linkboys and mudlarks as to 'Mister Quick', their nickname for a mysterious masked figure who stole away young boys that later turned up dead, as hosts to zombie eggs implanted by the self-styled 'Queen of the zombies', La Voisin, the second in command of Mene Tekel. Managing to narrow down Mister Quick's last known attack to a particular coffee house, Defoe realised that one of the patrons who were there that night had to be Mene Tekel himself – the six members of the King's own Cabal, Damned, and his spymaster Provost.

Later, in the process of closing down an illegal zombie pit fight, he encountered an enigmatic foreign diplomat, Countess Madalena von Konigsberg, or 'Prussian Blue', who seemed to have some measure of control over the undead. She managed to get away, but Defoe was not slow to realise that this was almost certainly La Voisin herself. This was confirmed when he met Damned for the first time shortly afterward, who informed him of Fear's information, namely that La Voisin was operating out of Ipswich with the aid of ten highly intelligent super-zombies, the Diabolonians. The two swore to track down the fiends responsible for Fear's death together.

=== Queen of the Zombies ===
Defoe and the Brethren of the Night tracked La Vosion to Ipswich and encountered the Diabolonians in their coffins, slaying all ten super-zombies – but not without the loss of one of their own number, the Spiriter, whose heart was torn from his chest. La Voison fled unharmed, but the Brethren were able to track her back to London and thus learn her true identity, Defoe realising that she was indeed the same woman he had met some months earlier.

Back in London, Defoe and Damned made their move at a party held in Nonsuch House – attended, among others, by La Voisin, Robert Hooke, Samuel Pepys, and the members of the King's Cabal, one of whom was almost certainly Mene Tekel him(or her) self – William Bedloe, Colonel Thomas Blood, Aphra Behn, Doctor Richard Busby, Thomas Dangerfield and Bevil Skelton. Unbeknownst to any of them, however, the Spiriter – lately risen from the dead – had also returned to London in the meantime, and proceeded to release the hordes of undead kept caged at Wapping, awaiting exportation to the colonies and plantations as cheap manual labour.

While Robert Hooke demonstrated to the guests at the party his 'clockpunks', clockwork automatons with zombie brain matter, Damned and Defoe made their move against La Voisin. She outwitted them both and used her sorcery to take command of the clockpunks before fleeing. Defoe chased La Voisin back through a ballroom become a slaughterhouse, as clockpunks ran rampant, murdering guests with impunity. He succeeded in chasing her down and beheading her, earning vengeance for Fear. When Damned and Aphra Benn managed to escape the burning building, they revealed to Titus the shocking truth – not only was Colonel Blood Mene Tekel, but this was only one of several faces that he had worn in his time – his true identity was Johann Faust.

=== A Murder of Angels ===
Led by the zombie Spiriter, the undead from Wapping besieged the Tower and Isaac Newton's Mint, their intent surely to disrupt the alchemical production of gold that kept Britannia the world's principal power, forcing the Brethren to the defence. Ezreel Tonge died in the assault, and only an intervention by the Tower's Ravenmaster and druid Morvran helped repel an attack by airborne zombies. With the hordes temporarily rebuffed, Defoe was free to attend to the matter of the imminent public execution of the Tower's most dangerous prisoner – Terra Moto, a misshapen monstrosity believed to be an angel trapped halfway when trying to shape shift into a human.

While the Brethren entertained Thomas Brandon, the executioner (son of Richard Brandon), Morvran slipped away, only to be surprised by a large, pale fish-like monstrosity known as The Pale Rider, who barbarically slew the druid. With Morvran dead and his protective powers no longer in force around the Tower, it was rendered open to angelic interference. On consultation with John Milton, Defoe and Damned realised that The Pale Rider was himself an angel, a seraph of the first sphere, who had come to prevent Terra Moto revealing the secrets of the angels. They raced to prevent the execution, having realised that Brandon was himself the Seraph. Revealed for what he was, the Seraph discarded Brandon's form and called the undead still waiting outside to his aid. Solomon Eagle died at their hands as the crowd that had gathered to watch the execution fled to safety, leaving Defoe to stand against the Seraph. After a fight in which Terra Moto died, Ketch managed to behead the angel, but the undead were too great a force. As the zombies broke into the Martin Tower and pillaged the Crown Jewels, the survivors fled into the White Tower to make their final stand, as an aggrieved Faust looked on and plotted from afar...

=== The Damned ===
Faust appeared to Tomazine Scarlet in a dream, reminding her of her time in prison, when she prayed for the angels to take her unborn baby. He revealed it was delivered into his care and has since grown up with him. Using the boy as leverage, he forced her into agreeing to leave an oubliette in the White Tower open for the undead forces to break in. The Zombie hunters fended off the subsequent incursion, but Tomazine's betrayal came out. Defoe concocted a plan; rather than wait for the army to relieve the siege, he'll strike directly at Faust, the zombie's controlling influence. He, Damned and Tomazine disguised themselves as zombies to slip through the crowd outside, destroying the Spiriter before they make their getaway. Back at Nonsuch House there is a confrontation with Faust, who also has Jack O' Bite with him. He gives Tomazine back her son as proof of his good will and offers Defoe a bargain – the killer of his family for a way into the Tower. When Titus agrees to the offer, Damned attacks him as a traitor and Defoe knocks him unconscious. Faust lowered his protective aura to let Jack out, whom Defoe beheads – and he then goes on to give Faust the necessary tactics for victory. The battle for the Tower begins to go against the zombie hunters, but it has all been a ruse – Defoe attacks Faust, who flees Nonsuch House, taking Tomazine and her son with him as hostages. A pursuit and chase ended with the final death of Faust, and robbed of their controlling influence the zombies hordes disperse. With uncomfortable memories of his murdered family dredged up, Defoe quit his position as Zombie Hunter General to be true to his leveller roots.

=== The London Hanged ===
1671. Defoe was living a quiet life of domestic bliss with Tomazine and her son Sean in the hamlet of Tyburn, when the cottage was surrounded and attacked by reeks. Their leader was a New Pretender, a hanged highwayman called Tom Cox, who invited Defoe out to parley. Cox told him that the hanged criminal dead of Tyburn have risen to make war on the rich, and wanted Defoe to lead them. Titus refused, returning home to urge Tomazine and Sean to go into hiding in the liberty of Alsatia while he investigated this new reek outbreak with Damned. Having returned to his former profession as sedan chair carrier with Jack Ketch, Defoe was at work at the Monument, base of the Vizards, when he found a Vizard the worse for drink. Defoe put on his disguise to sneak into their secret meeting, where he learnt that their leader John Evelyn is planning an attack on the lawless Alsatia. While Defoe rushed to protect his family, the majority of the Vizards decamped to a coffee house, which was attacked by Cox's reeks. They seemingly killed Judge George Jeffreys in the attack - only the vizard's aetheric powers save him. As only the Vizards themselves knew they would be in the coffee house at that time, Damned deduces that one of the group must be the new Resurrectionist who has raised the reeks - and asked Titus to investigate.

During the Vizard attack on Alsatia, Defoe came face-to-face with one of their number, Carrion Killer, and battled him to the death. With the help of Jack Ketch, Defoe dumped the body in St James' Park while the Brethren were fighting reeks in the fog, hoping to make the death look like an attack by the undead. Ketch quit his job after this, going back to his old profession of hangman. While recruiting for his replacement, Mungo Gallowgrass of the Brethren approached Titus wanting the job. When Titus refused, Mungo made it clear that he alone was not fooled by Titus' deception and knew exactly who slew Carrion Killer. Titus reluctantly employed Gallowgrass as chair carrier, as well as assistant in his investigation of the Vizards. Between them they deduced that John Evelyn was the resurrectionist, and confronted him at his manor in Deptford. Titus killed Evelyn for his crimes and vows to make the country see the other 'heroes' as they really are.

== Appearances ==
Defoe has so far appeared in eight serials (all written by Pat Mills), four of which have been collected into two trade paperbacks, the first with around twenty panels redrawn.

- 1666 (ISBN 1906735107) collects:
  - "1666" (in 2000 AD #1540–1549, 2007)
  - "Brethren of the Night" (#1589–1598, 2008)
- Queen of the Zombies (ISBN 1907992472) collects:
  - "Queen of the Zombies" (#1640–1649, 2009)
  - "A Murder of Angels" (#1700–1709, 2010)
- Uncollected:
  - "The Damned" (in 2000 AD #1836–1847, 2013)
  - "Frankensteiner" (in 2000 AD Winter Special 2014)
  - "The London Hanged" (in 2000 AD #1950–1960, 2015)
  - "Diehards" (in 2000 AD #2026–2039, 2017)
  - "The Divisor" (in 2000 AD #2150–2161, 2019)

== Historical characters referenced in Defoe ==
Besides the principal (mostly fictional) characters, Defoe is littered with references to a vast number of notable historical figures. Some feature prominently as characters in their own right, others warrant only a passing mention. They include the following:

- 1666
  - Charles II, Isaac Newton, John Ketch, Richard Busby, Samuel Pepys, Leonardo da Vinci, Christopher Wren, Robert Hooke, La Voisin, John Milton, Francis Bacon, John Dee, Heinrich Cornelius Agrippa, Paracelsus, Nicolas Flamel, Robert Boyle, Oliver Cromwell, Charles I, Christiaan Huygens, Robert Lockier, Hernán Cortés.
- Brethren of the Night
  - Matthew Hopkins, William Thompson, Ben Caunt, Nero, Julius Caesar, Augustus, Tiberius, Caligula, Aphra Behn, John Evelyn, John Gadbury, Judge Jeffreys, Thomas Rainsborough, Bevil Skelton, Thomas Blood, Thomas Dangerfield, William Bedloe, John Bunyan.
- Queen of the Zombies
  - Ferdinand Verbiest, Samuel Pepys, Christopher Marlowe, Johann Faust.
- A Murder of Angels
  - Nell Gwyn, Richard Brandon, Dom Perignon, Talbot Edwards.
- The Damned
  - Forthcoming
- 'The London Hanged'
  - John Evelyn, Sir Richard Ford, Judge Jeffreys

== See also ==
- Isaac Newton in popular culture
