= The Westgate School, Winchester =

School in Winchester, Hampshire, England

The Westgate School
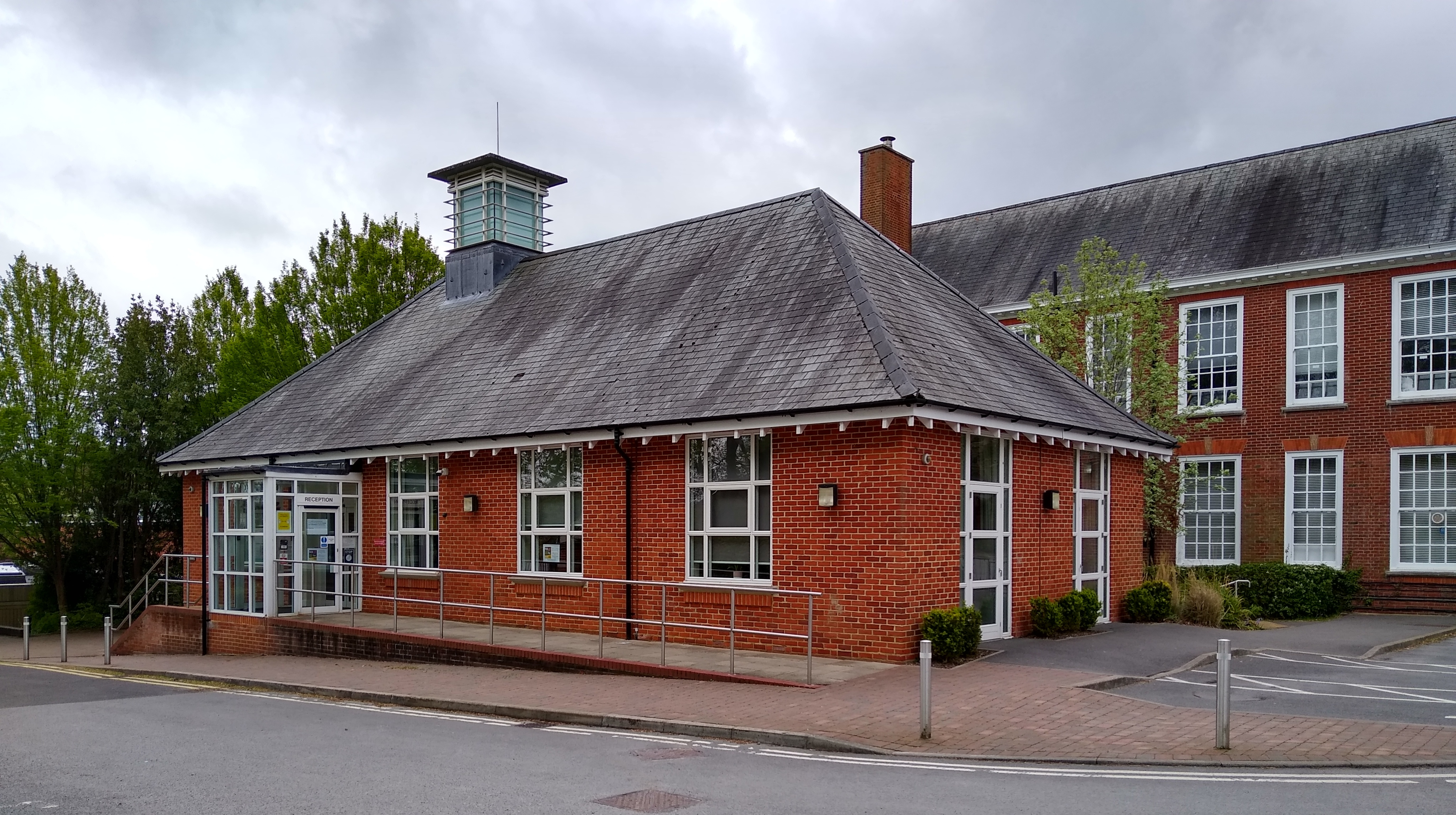

Location
- Cheriton Road; Winchester, Hampshire, SO22 5AZ; England; 51.0675°N 1.3306°W

Information
- Type: Community comprehensive
- Established: 1977
- Local authority: Hampshire
- Department for Education URN: 116407 Tables
- Ofsted: Reports
- Head teacher: Fae Dean
- Gender: Mixed
- Age: 4 to 16
- Enrolment: 1134
- Colour: maroon red
- Website: http://www.westgate.hants.sch.uk

The Westgate School is a mixed all-through school located in Winchester, Hampshire, United Kingdom.

== History ==
The school was founded in the early 1900s as the Winchester County School for Girls, becoming Winchester County High School for Girls (WCHS) in 1936. By the 1970s it had 900 girls.

It had been a grammar school for girls only, until September 1973 when the first intake of comprehensive boys and girls entered the first year. At this point the school was renamed as The Westgate School. Many of the old grammar school teachers left in July 1974 to work in the neighbouring newly established sixth form college, the former Peter Symonds boys' grammar school. The Deputy Head, Barbara Taylor, was one who made the move, but the Headmistress, Sylvia Rowe, remained for several more years.

The last grammar school intake left in July 1977, leaving The Westgate School entirely comprehensive and co-ed from then on.

Peter Jenner was Headmaster at the school from 1983 to 2006, during its formative years as a comprehensive.

== Achievements ==
In recent years between 75 and 80% of 15- and 16-year-olds have achieved five or more GCSE grades A* to C, 70-80% including Maths and English. According to the BBC league tables, Westgate is one of Hampshire's top state schools.

== Notable former pupils ==
- Andy Burrows, former drummer for the band Razorlight
- Beth O'Leary, English author of romantic comedy novels
- Lucy Pinder, British glamour model
- Philippa Forrester, British TV presenter and co-producer
- Tom Hayes (trader), former trader who was arrested, tried, sentenced to 14 years in prison for role in the Libor Scandal
- Rick Adams, television presenter, DJ and producer

=== Winchester County High School for Girls ===
- Gillian Ashmore (nee Oxenham), chief executive from 2001 to 2002 of the Equal Opportunities Commission, and regional director from 1994 to 1998 of the Government Office for South East England
- Diane Corner, deputy head of the United Nations Multidimensional Integrated Stabilization Mission in the Central African Republic since 2014, High Commissioner to Tanzania from 2009 to 2013
- Dame Myra Curtis, principal from 1942 to 1954 of Newnham College, Cambridge
- Julia Darling, novelist
- Dame Julie Mellor, chair from 1999 to 2005 of the Equal Opportunities Commission
- Alex Mitchell (née Beale, 1947–2010), former editor of Christian monthly magazine Third Way
- Winifred Moberly, principal from 1919 to 1928 of St Hilda's College, Oxford
- Jane Reynolds, chief executive from 1991 to 2000 of the Royal Masonic Benevolent Institution
- Marion Richardson, artist
- Prof Jocelyn Toynbee, Laurence Professor of Classical Archaeology from 1951 to 1962 at the University of Cambridge
