= St Swithun's School, Winchester =

St Swithun's School
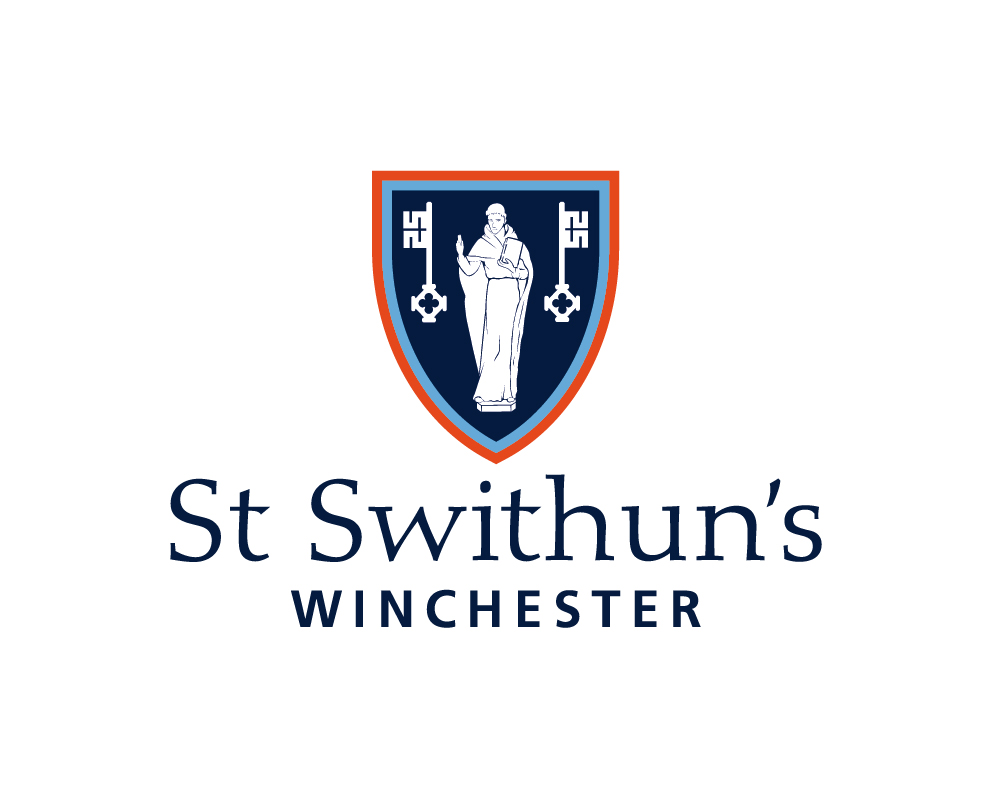

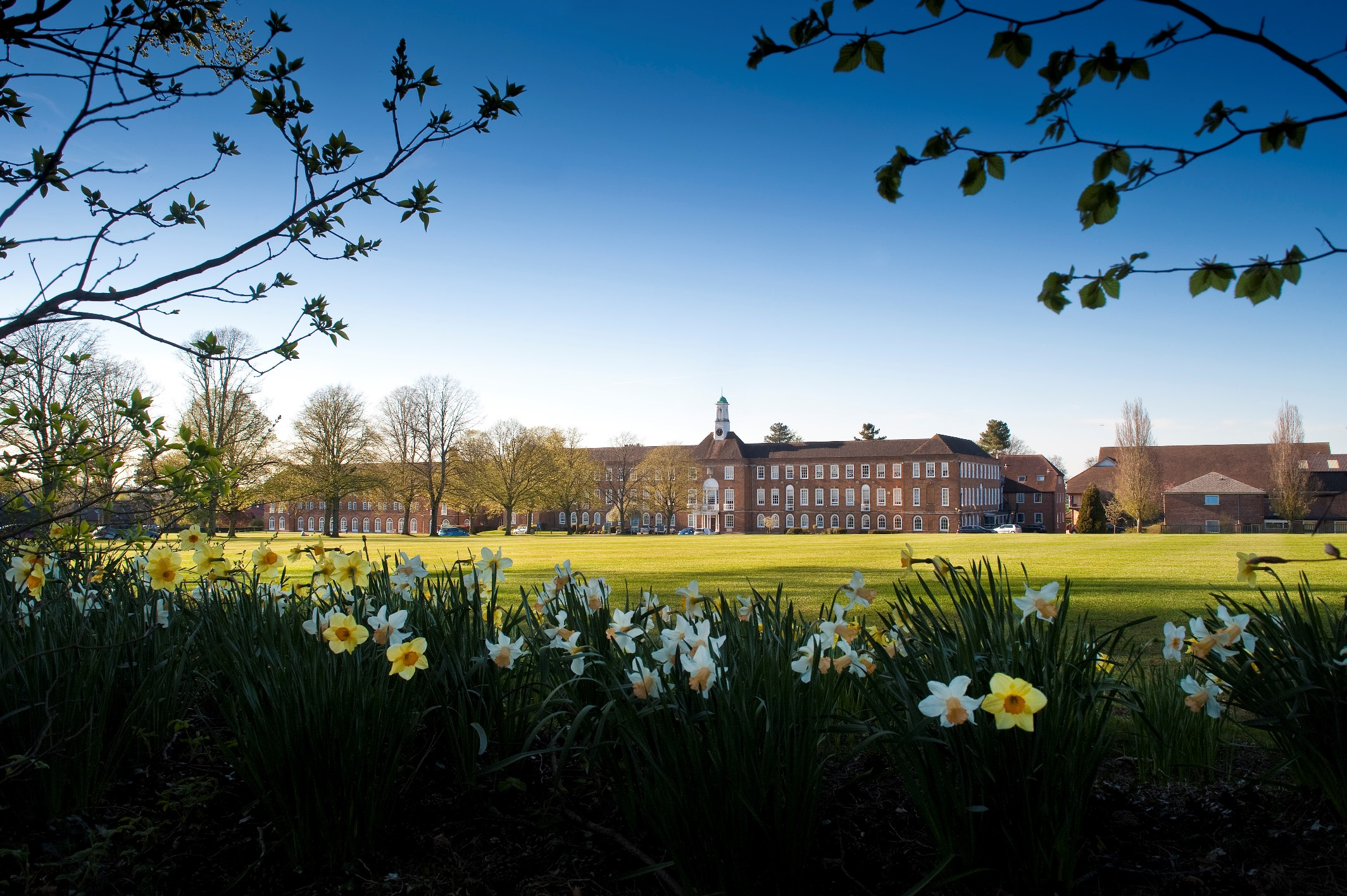

Location
- Alresford Rd; Winchester, Hampshire, SO21 1HA; England
- 51°03′50″N 1°17′20″W

Information
- Type: Independent day, weekly and full boarding
- Motto: Caritas, Humilitas, Sinceritas; Latin: Kindness, Humility, Sincerity
- Religious affiliation: Church of England
- Established: 1884
- Founder: Anna Bramston
- Local authority: Hampshire
- Headmistress: Jane Gandee
- Gender: Girls
- Age: 3 to 18
- Enrolment: 713 (2016)
- Alumnae: Old Swithunites
- Website: http://www.stswithuns.com/

St Swithun's School is an independent day, weekly and full-boarding school for girls in Winchester, Hampshire. It is named after Saint Swithun, a Bishop of Winchester and patron saint of Winchester Cathedral.

== History ==
Coat of Arms

St Swithun's was founded as "Winchester High School" by Miss Anna Bramston, daughter of John Bramston, the then Dean of Winchester, with the ambition of educating "daughters of worthy citizens of Winchester." Not having sufficient money of her own, funds were raised by subscription. The school opened on 5 May 1884 with seventeen pupils. Pupil numbers soon grew and the school began taking in boarders as well.

In 1909, the school rented ten acres on Magdalen Hill for sports. The school's name was changed to Winchester Girls' School and then, after World War I, to St Swithun's School: the recorded virtues of this saint – Caritas, Humilitas, Sinceritas – were adopted as the school's motto in 1928.

St Swithun's moved to its present location on Magdalen Hill Down on the edge of Winchester in 1931. Princess Mary the Princess Royal opened the new buildings formally in 1932, but the outbreak of World War II saw the school turned into a hospital and by 1942 St Swithun's became an American casualty clearing station. The school celebrated its 75th anniversary in 1959 with the Duke of Gloucester as a special guest.

Today, St Swithun's includes both junior and senior schools, meaning pupils can attend from nursery all the way to sixth form level. Boys may attend Nursery. A new junior school building was opened in September 2015 with a further sports hall that opened in Easter 2016.

St Swithun's retains an Anglican tradition through its links with Winchester Cathedral. It holds five services there every year and the girls' choir sings at the cathedral.

== Curriculum ==
In 2011 GCSEs, the school topped the results table for the city of Winchester with a 100% passing rate and all candidates achieving at least 5 A*-C grades, surpassing Winchester College. The same year, it broke its records in the A Levels with 11 girls scoring 3 or more A* grades. Since the year 2000 the school has had 100% pass rate in both GCSEs and A-Levels.

In 2023, the school achieved an 80% pass rate with grades 9–7 in GCSEs and a 61% rate for A*/A grades at A-levels, with 86 percent earning A*-B grades.

== School Organisation ==
=== Prep School ===
The Early Years department (nursery) is coeducational, with girls only from reception upwards. The prep department comprises Years 3 to 6 and girls are prepared for the Common Entrance Examination. The Junior School is a member of the Independent Association of Preparatory Schools.

=== Senior School ===
Year Groups

- Lower 4 – Year 7
- Upper 4 – Year 8
- Lower 5 – Year 9
- Middle 5 – Year 10
- Upper 5 – Year 11
- Lower Sixth – Year 12
- Upper Sixth – Year 13

== Houses ==
Each girl belongs to a house. Girls are assigned to either a boarding or day house except for those in Upper Sixth (Year 13), who belong to a single house. The house system is an integral part of school life as there are inter-house competitions in many co-curricular activities such as sports, public speaking and drama.

House	Year	Day/Boarding
Le Roy	L4	Boarding
Chilcomb	L4	Day
Caer Gwent	U4-L6	Day
Davies	U4-L6	Day
Mowbray	U4-L6	Day
Earlsdown	U4-L6	Boarding
High House	U4-L6	Boarding
Hillcroft	U4-L6	Boarding
Hyde Abbey	U4-L6	Boarding
Venta	U4-L6	Day
Finlay	U6	Day & Boarding

== Facilities ==
Sports facilities include 9 lacrosse pitches, 13 tennis courts (1 indoors), 6 netball courts, a 25-meter indoor swimming pool and a multi-purpose sports hall. In 2003, the PAC (Performing Arts Centre) – now "The Harvey Hall" – was opened, and it has a large auditorium to sit over 700, and also includes a Studio Theatre, Green Rooms, Box Office and a smaller SPS (Small Performance Space).

A new library was opened in 2007 by the Mayor of Winchester Chris Pines and Rev James Atwell, Dean of Winchester.

In 2021, a new study centre, the Jill Isaac Study Centre, was opened.

== Sports ==
The school was national lacrosse champion in 2008. Girls are encouraged to take up a sport and may choose from athletics, badminton, basketball, cricket, lacrosse and netball, Zumba, handball, trampolining, touch rugby, tennis, pilates and fitness.

== Admissions ==
As for many other independent schools, candidates for entry to St Swithun's must sit the Common Entrance Examination. Candidates for academic scholarships are selected based on the results of the Common Entrance examinations (11+ and 13+) and are invited to attend an interview soon after completion of the examination. Sixth form scholarship candidates (16+) are selected based solely on the results of academic assessments in the subjects that they intend to take at A level.

== Notable alumnae ==
- Lady Camilla Bingham (1970–), barrister
- Emma Chambers (1964–2018), actress
- Fi Glover (1969–), BBC radio presenter
- Lucia Kendall (2004–), English professional footballer
- Alex Mitchell, née Beale (1947–2010), editor of Christian magazine Third Way
- Vivienne Parry (1956–), journalist and author
- Arabella Pollen (1961–), fashion designer
- Zara Rutherford, (2002–), aviator
- Sheila Scotter (1920–2012), Australian fashion designer
- Emma Walmsley (1969–), CEO, GlaxoSmithKline
- Mary Warnock (1924–2019), philosopher
- Gabriella Wilde (1989–), English model and actress
