= Charles Freeman (American Giant) =

Charles Freeman (1821–1845), known as the "American Giant" or "Michigan Giant", was a tall and powerfully built man who featured as an "exhibit" in America before meeting the English heavyweight boxer Ben Caunt. They provided an entertainment by sparring on stage. Freeman accompanied Caunt to England where he continued his boxing exhibitions. He achieved fame when he was matched in two prizefights with William Perry (the Tipton Slasher). Despite not being trained as a bare-knuckle boxer he drew one fight and won the second bout. He remained in England as an entertainer until his early death of consumption in 1845.

== Early life ==
Charles Freeman was born on 16 July 1821 in New York City. His family moved to Illinois when he was aged 3 but then moved to St Joseph, Michigan. He grew up on a farm where he reached a remarkable size. He moved to the East Coast at the age of 19, first to New York and then Boston, where he featured as an "exhibit" in Mr Harrington's Museum. In January 1841 he was described as "a Hercules, and an Apollo Belvidere combined in one person". He was also described as being 7 feet 4 inches tall and capable of lifting a dead weight of 1500 pounds. In March 1841 it was reported: "the greatest man living is said to be a modern Goliah named Charles Freeman, now at Boston. He is a native of New York State, but 19 years old, measures 7 feet 3 inches in height, and weighs 300 pounds. He is double jointed, a very Sampson in strength, is well proportioned, and formed with the most perfect symmetry."

== Meeting with Ben Caunt ==
Ben Caunt was a famous bareknuckle boxer from England who went on tour in the US in the early 1840s, where he met Freeman. According to a letter from Caunt dated December 1841: "when at Philadelphia I intended taking a Southern tour, but an unexpected circumstance brought me back to New York. There appeared a challenge in the papers of New York from the Michigan Giant to me; my friends at New York went to try to make a match with him; they offered to back me for ten thousand dollars a side, and sent for me to return as soon as possible".

Although there was no prizefight, the pair sparred together on stage in the US before crossing the Atlantic together, leaving for England on 19 February 1842, when it was reported that the two had departed: "Caunt to meet Bendigo in combat, and Freeman to astonish the English fancy with his nerve, strength and stature". On arrival they toured various theatres in England.

== Boxing career ==
In 1842, the recently retired boxer Johnny Broome set up a bareknuckle prizefight between Freeman and William Perry (known as the "Tipton Slasher") despite the American having no experience of prizefighting. During training for the fight in November of that year, he was given a medical examination that stated his characteristics as: "Vital capacity, 434 cubic inches; height, 6 ft. 11¼in.; weight, 19 st. 5 lb.; circumference of his chest, 47 inches; inspiratory power, 5.0 inches; expiratory power, 6.5 inches." The first fight between Perry and Freeman took place on 6 December 1842 at Sawbridgeworth and was declared a draw as darkness descended on the boxers after 70 rounds of boxing. An attempt to stage a re-match a few days later on 15 December was abandoned as the authorities intervened. The re-match finally took place on 20 December of the same year, at Cliffe Marshes, Gravesend, when Freeman was declared the winner after 38 rounds as Perry dropped to the floor without being struck by his opponent.

== Final years and death ==
These two bouts with the Tipton Slasher were the only recorded prize-fights undertaken by Freeman. He returned to being a circus and theatrical entertainer until his early death of consumption on 18 October 1845 at Winchester Hospital. Ben Caunt attended his funeral at a cemetery in Winchester on 23 October 1845. In June 1860, Freeman's grave in Winchester's West Hill Cemetery, was marked by a stone obelisk, about ten feet high. The stone was provided by John C. Heenan, the American bare-knuckle fighter and his fellow countryman, John Macdonald.
