= Johnny Broome =

English bare-knuckle boxer (1818–1855)

Jonnhy Broome
Personal information
- Nickname: Young Duckro
- Nationality: British
- Born: 14 March 1818 Birmingham, England
- Died: 31 May 1855 (aged 37) London, England
- Height: 5 ft 6.5 in (1.69 m)
- Weight: 140 lb (64 kg)

Boxing career

Boxing record
- Total fights: 10
- Wins: 10
- Losses: 0
- Draws: 0

Johnny Broome (Born: 14 March 1818; Birmingham, England – 31 May 1855; England) was a lightweight bare-knuckle boxer.

Broome was a gifted pugilist known as "Young Duckro." He was never defeated in the prize ring, and had a younger brother (Harry Broome) who became Heavyweight Champion of England. Johnny stood 5' 6½" and weighed between 133 and 140 pounds.

== Early life ==
Johnny Broome was born in Birmingham on 14 March 1818. According to one source: "while he was yet a boy he could ride a pony at full gallop, standing on its bare back, and hence he gained in the neighbour-hood the nickname of "Young Ducrow" (Andrew Ducrow was a famous acrobatic horseman of the age). The same source states: "Johnny was by trade a hammerman, and his work at the anvil strengthened and developed the muscles of his splendid chest and arms."

== Boxing career ==
Johnny Broome fought 10 times and was undefeated when he retired from the ring. Early fights took place with Jack Hunt, Tom Ellis and Bill Holwell, Welsh Champion, resulting in a draw and two victories for Broome. Subsequently, a fight took against Charles Spilsbury on 26 January 1835.

Subsequent fights took place against: Gallet on 5 February 1838; Charley Jones at Woore, Newcastle-under-Lyme on 21 May 1839; McGinty, near Glasgow on 1 July 1840; Joe Bostock in Warwickshire on 6 October 1840.

Broome won the Lightweight Championship of England when he defeated Jack Hannan in Oxfordshire, England on 26 January 1841. The bout lasted 47 rounds and 79 minutes. Broome defended his title against John Gorrick (known as "Bungaree") on 27 April 1842 near Newmarket, England. Broome won in 42 rounds and 57 minutes.

In addition to his fighting career, Johnny Broome was also influential in the boxing world as a financial backer and arranger of fights. One fighter that he backed for a period was William Perry (the Tipton Slasher). Broome attempted to arrange a fight between Perry and James "Deaf" Burke in August 1842, although the match was cancelled as Broome failed to pay the deposit on the match stake in time. Later in the same year Broome set up the two fights between Perry and the American, Charles Freeman. Broome also managed the fighting career of his younger brother Harry Broome, eventually setting up a fight with William Perry, which resulted in Harry Broome being recognized as Champion of England in 1851.

== Horse racing ==
In 1848 Broome accepted an offer to compete in the Grand National steeplechase at Aintree. On board an unconsidered outsider named Eagle, he got as far as Becher's Brook on the second circuit before falling.

== Suicide ==
Towards the end, Broome's reputation was tainted with scandal, as he was associated with some questionable transactions and a card fixing fraud. On 31 May 1855 he walked into the kitchens of the Wrekin Tavern, at Bow Street, took a carving knife and cut his own throat. He bled to death and was buried at West Norwood Cemetery.

His younger brother, Harry Broome (1825–1865) was also a prize fighter.

== See also ==
- List of bare-knuckle boxers
