= Magdalen Hill Down =

Chalk downland in Hampshire, England

- Downland
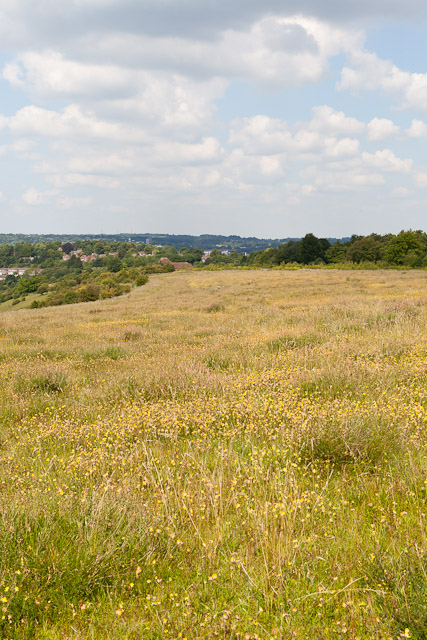

- Location in Hampshire
- Coordinates: 51.06053°N 1.27774°W
- Location: Hampshire
- Elevation: 124 metres (407 ft)

Magdalen Hill Down is a chalk downland hill, situated 1.5 miles (2.4 km) to the east of the centre of the city of Winchester in the English county of Hampshire. It is crossed by the B3404 road, the old main road from Winchester to London via New Alresford and Guildford. Most of the land to the south of the road is now a reserve run by the Butterfly Conservation, but part of it is used by the Magdalen Hill Cemetery, Winchester's principal cemetery. The land to the north of the road is largely farmed, but is also home to St Swithun's School and Leigh House Hospital.

The down lies in the Winchester district, mostly within the parish of Chilcomb. At its highest point, the down reaches 124 metres (407 ft) above mean sea level.

== History ==
The down contains a set of Bronze Age barrows, which are situated to the south of the road, and are designated as a scheduled monument. This includes a linear arrangement of five bowl barrows extending over a distance of approximately 85 metres (279 ft) with the ground sloping steeply below them to the south.

In the mediaeval period, Magdalen Hill Down was home to St Mary Magdalen's leprosarium, or leprosy hospital, which was situated to the north-eastern end of the site and was established in the 12th century. This was remodelled in the 14th century, but was largely demolished in the 16th century to make way for brick-built almshouses, although the medieval chapel survived. The almshouses were used as military accommodation during the English Civil War, and again to house prisoners of war from the Anglo-Dutch wars of the 1660s and 1670s. In the 1780s the buildings were demolished leaving no above ground remains in what is now farmland, although subsequent excavation has revealed their location.

In 1914, Magdalen Hill Cemetery opened on the down. Towards the end of the First World War, an extensive military camp, known as Morn Hill Camp and housing 50,000 to 70,000 troops, was created on the down. The camp was largely occupied by American Expeditionary Forces, who were in transit to the Western Front. It was linked to Winchester by a branch off the short-lived Avington railway line, specifically built to serve the camps in the area.

By 1989 much of the site had become heavily invaded by scrub, but because the fields had never been ploughed or had chemical fertilisers or pesticides used on them, they preserved a rich variety of wild flowers and the butterflies that feed on them. As a result and in that year, the Butterfly Conservation acquired a part of the down, since expanded twice, for use as a butterfly reserve.
