= Bill Brassey =

English bar-knuckle boxer

Bill Brassey (known as John Leechman) was an English bare-knuckle boxer.

On 26 October 1840 Ben Caunt defeated Bill Brassey at Six Mile Bottom, Cambridgeshire, in 101 rounds.

== See also ==
- List of bare-knuckle boxers
