= William Perry (boxer) =

British heavyweight prize fighter

- William Perry

Personal information
- Nickname: The Tipton Slasher
- Nationality: English
- Born: 1819 Tipton, Staffordshire, England
- Died: 24 December 1880 (aged 61) Bilston, Staffordshire, England
- Height: 6 ft 0.5 in (1.842 m)
- Weight: 13 st 7 lb (86 kg; 189 lb)

Boxing career

Boxing record
- Total fights: 11
- Wins: 6
- Losses: 3
- Draws: 2

William Perry (1819 – 24 December 1880), known as "The Tipton Slasher" after his native town of Tipton, was a British heavyweight prize fighter of the 19th century and claimed the championship of England, with some dispute, for two periods between 1850 and 1857. His fighting career began in London in 1835 and after fighting a number of highly rated championship contenders, he first claimed the English heavyweight championship by defeating Tom Paddock in twenty-seven rounds on 17 December 1850.

In 1851 he lost the English heavyweight title in a controversial referee's decision to Harry Broome which he strongly disputed. After the leading contenders of the day refused to fight him, Perry reclaimed the English title until Tom Sayers defeated him in a championship bout in 1857.

== Early life ==
Perry was born in Tipton (then in Staffordshire, now West Midlands) in 1819. His parents were Timothy, a miner, and Sarah Perry. He was the third of five children, and baptized at St Martin's, Tipton on 1 August 1819. At the time of the baptism, his parents were living in the Lea Brook area of Tipton. At the age of 16 he was reportedly working as a navvy in London.

== Boxing career ==
=== Early Fights, 1835-9 ===
Perry began his career as a bareknuckle heavyweight boxer in London at the age of 16. According to one source "he was well known in the neighbourhood of Battersea Fields and Chelsea as a "lumping lad" who, despite the drawback of 'a K leg' [knock knees], could hit, stop, and use his 'fives' with formidable effect". In his first recorded fight, Perry fought and beat Barney Dogherty on 3 November 1835. The fight began at Mortlake opposite the Ship pub where 7 rounds were fought but the bout was interrupted by the police. Subsequently, the boxers moved to Lechmere Common, London where Perry defeated Dogherty after 7 more rounds of boxing. According to one account of the second part of the fight: "on squaring elbows there was a good deal of sparring and Perry dodged left and right. After some heavy exchanges and a rally, Barney was down weak. The fight was prolonged for six rounds more, during which Perry had it all his own way, punishing Barney terrifically; still the poor fellow came up as game as a rhinoceros, and would not give in until his seconds, seeing he had not a chance, cried 'enough'".

His second recorded fight was with Ben Spilsbury from Birmingham, after Perry had returned to his native Black Country. According to one source: "a party of Birmingham boxers, having among their number one Ben Spilsbury (not Charley who fought Johnny Broome) being in the town of Tipton exhibiting the art, young Perry put on the mufflers with that professional". Perry's good sparring performance with Spilsbury led to a challenge for a fight with a £10 per side stake. The bout took place on 27 December 1836 in Oldbury for £10 per side and lasted 19 rounds, Perry eventually winning. It was reported of Spilsbury: "after taking some little liberties with the Tipton in the opening rounds, for which he occasionally caught a fearful right-handed visitation, and was rallied down, Spilsbury kept so completely a la distance as to deprive the contest of any interest, and finally, at the end of the 19th round, "cut it," leaving "The Slasher" in possession of the field and the stakes".

It was after this fight that Perry's nickname "The Tipton Slasher" became established.

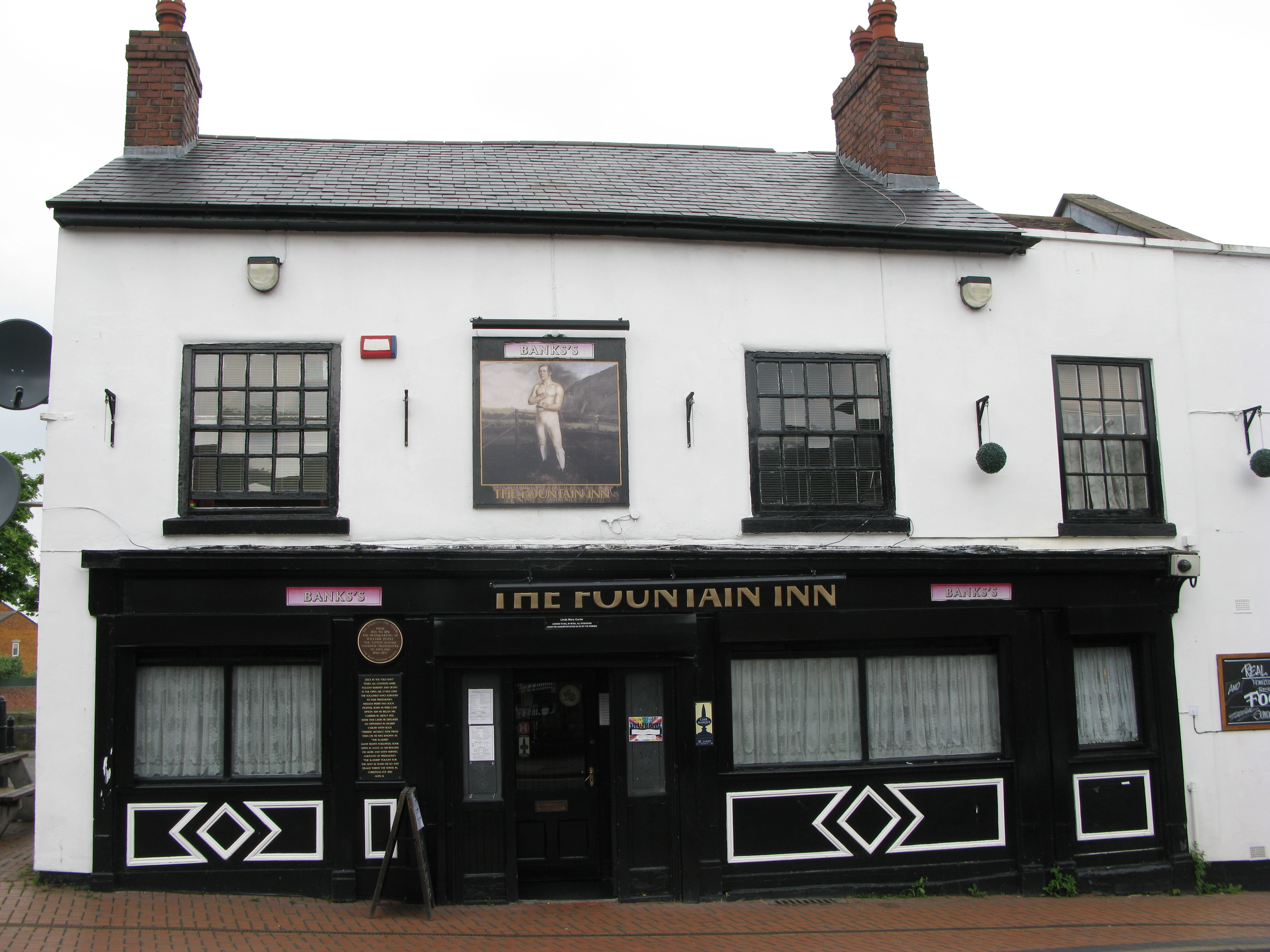
Perry features on the pub sign of the Fountain Inn, Tipton. The pub was described as the Slasher's headquarters at the time of the Scunner fight

On 22 November 1837, Perry took on Jem Scunner from Gornal, the fight being staged at a site near Gornal and at Wolverhampton for £25 per side. One of Perry's seconds was Tass Parker, who later became a rival for the Slasher. The fight took place over two days, commencing in near Gornal. After a few rounds on the first day, the fight was halted after the supporters of the Gornal man claimed Perry had committed a foul. The fight resumed on the following day at Kingswood near Wolverhampton and Perry ended up as victor after a fight of an hour including 31 rounds.

After the fight it was noted "Perry, with Parker, became the "lions" of the neighbourhood; the Fountain Inn, at Tipton, the Slasher's headquarters, being crowded by the Fancy of the Midlands at their benefit on the ensuing Monday."

In 1839, Perry attempted to make a match with Tunchy Shelton of Derby. However, the fight did not take place after Shelton claimed that Perry had not paid part of the deposit for the fight.

=== Managed by Johnny Broome ===
Perry came to the attention of another boxer, the London-based Johnny Broome, who decided to promote Perry's future fights. According to one story, Broome led Perry about town with a chain around his neck, "pretending that he was a wild man of the woods". Broome attempted to set up a match with a boxer named Randall from Devon who was backed by the publican, Ben Burn. However the arrangement fell through. Next Broome attempted to set up a fight with James "Deaf" Burke in August 1842, but the match was cancelled as Broome failed to pay the deposit on the match stake in time.

=== Bouts with Charles Freeman ===
Perry's next two fights were against a giant American called Charles Freeman. Freeman had been a circus performer in America and had been encountered there by the British fighter Ben Caunt (known as "Big Ben"). Caunt claimed in a letter that Freeman stood over 7 ft tall and weighed in excess of 23st. The boxing chronicle Pugilistica claimed he stood "6ft 10½in in his stocking feet" and weighed 18st. The American accompanied Caunt on his return to England in 1842, when "Freeman during several months, not only exhibited at the Queen's Theatre, Lyceum, Olympic, Adelphi, Victoria, and other theatres, halls and assembly rooms, where a great feature of the entertainments was a caricature of boxing by the giant and Big Ben, but the non-sporting papers were flooded with ridiculous paragraphs, several of them offensively setting forth the wonderful powers and prowess of the American gladiator."

The first fight between Perry and Freeman took place on 6 December 1842 at Sawbridgeworth and was declared a draw as darkness descended on the boxers after 70 rounds of boxing. An attempt was made on 15 December to bring the match to a conclusion at Littlebury. However, the authorities prevented the bout taking place. The rematch finally took place on 20 December of the same year, and was held at Cliffe Marshes, Gravesend, where Freeman was declared the winner after 38 rounds as Perry dropped to the floor without being struck by his opponent.

These two bouts with the Tipton Slasher were the only recorded prize-fights undertaken by Freeman. He returned to being a circus and theatrical entertainer until his early death of consumption on 18 October 1845 at Winchester Hospital.

After the Freeman fight, Johnny Broome arranged a series of benefit exhibition fights for Perry in London, Birmingham, Manchester, Liverpool and Dublin. A match was arranged for 22 August 1843 with the fighter William Renwick of Liverpool, the fight to take place near Newcastle upon Tyne. However the bout did not take place as Renwick was arrested the Saturday before the fight at his training quarters.

=== Three fights with Tass Parker ===
The next three fights for Perry were against Tass Parker of West Bromwich. The first, arranged at Dartford Marshes on 19 December 1843 ended in a draw as the police intervened after 67 rounds of fighting. According to the editor of the sporting paper "Bell's Life": "in this affair he showed considerable improvement upon his former exhibition, and inflicted severe punishment with his right upon Parker".

The rematch to decide the contest was delayed as Johnny Broome produced a medical certificate stating that Perry had received a broken jaw in the first fight and had been treated for a fractured arm in November of that year. Thus it was not until 27 February 1844, the two met again, Perry being declared the winner as Parker went down without being hit. The third meeting on 4 August 1846 on Lindrick Common resulted in another victory for Perry. An observer of this final fight with Parker said of Perry: "He displayed an amount of judgment, coolness, science, and generalship which no one, not even those who knew him best, had previously credited him with, and these qualities, added to his immense bulk and strength, rendered him irresistible".

After the third bout with Tass Parker, Perry challenged Ben Caunt to fight for £100 a side. Caunt declined this challenge but said he would fight for between £300 and £500 stakes. However, a fight was not arranged, even when Caunt offered to fight all comers for £200 a side.

== Claiming a disputed English heavyweight championship, 1850 ==
Perry's next bout was with Tom Paddock on 17 December 1850 at Woking Common. Articles for the fight were signed on 1 October 1850 at the Castle Tavern, Holborn for a "fair stand-up fight, for £100 a-side". Perry won the contest, which lasted 27 rounds. It was after this fight that William Perry claimed the Championship of England. The Slasher now requested that the fighter Bendigo hand over the Championship belt, still in his possession, or make a match with him. He also made a general challenge for anyone to fight him for between £200 and £500 a side. Bendigo offered to fight for £500 but would not hazard the belt, which he claimed to be his private property. However, when Perry sent £50 to the editor of Bell's Life in London, in order to make the match, Bendigo backed out of the challenge.

=== Disputing controversial loss to Harry Broome, September, 1851 ===
The next fight for Perry was against Harry Broome, the brother of Johnny who had been promoting the Tipton Slasher. The match took place on 29 September 1851. Broome was awarded victory after Perry committed a 'foul' by striking Broome whilst he was on his knees. Broome claimed the Championship after this fight. However, Perry disputed the decision and his backers refused permission for the stake-holders to hand over the prize money.

An attempt to arrange a re-match between Perry and Broome failed and on 6 November 1851 it was reported that both Perry and Harry Broome had appeared before the Bow Street magistrates accused of fighting outside Evans Hotel, Covent Garden at 1 o'clock in the morning. Both were fined 20s.

=== Reclaiming the heavyweight championship, 1853 ===
After a victory against Harry Orme in 1853, Broome signed articles for another match with Perry but forfeited the deposit on the match fee rather than fight. Broome also wrote to the editor of the sporting paper Bell's Life in August 1853, when he "intimated his intention of retiring from the Prize Ring". Perry then claimed the Championship title again.

In early 1855, fight supporters commissioned a new championship belt, the previous one "having gone astray". The subscription raised £100 and a Bond Street jeweller was asked to make the new belt. At this date there were thought to be 5 possible contenders for the Championship: Perry, Harry Broome, Harry Orme, Tom Paddock and Aaron Jones.

Perry attempted to set up fights with Aaron Jones and Tom Paddock in 1856, but both forfeited to him rather than fight.

== Losing the heavyweight championship, June, 1857 ==
In 1856, Tom Sayers appeared as a new fighter on the rise among the English heavyweights. Although lighter than true heavyweights, Sayers showed that he could take on and beat them, disposing of Harry Paulson who, at over 12st in weight, weighed over 2st more than Sayers. In early 1857 he defeated the heavyweight Aaron Jones.

On 3 March 1857, the articles for a fight between Sayers and the Tipton Slasher were signed. The fight was to be for £100 per side plus the new Championship belt. According to one of the chroniclers of the Prize Ring, many thought it was "a wild, mad, revolutionary idea to match a 10st. 10lb. man of 5ft. 8in. against a 14 stunner of over 6ft., and the latter, mind you, no duffer, but the Champion of England, who had won his title by hard fighting". Perry was so confident of winning that he sold his pub in Spon Lane, and staked the proceeds on himself at 6 to 4 on odds. Though confident of winning, he did not underestimate Sayers and trained hard for the fight.

After holding it almost continuously for seven years, Perry lost the heavyweight title to Sayers on 16 June 1857 on the Isle of Grain. An eyewitness gave the following description of the scene at London's Fenchurch Street Station as the fight goers gathered:

"The frantic, noisy, blackguardly rabble surging round the entrance to the station : the crowd of swells in fashionable shooting -jackets and cloth caps all pushing their way with fierce eagerness to the ticket-office, as hansom after hansom disgorged its fare : the awful fight for tickets : the excited mob of gentlemen, publicans, tradesmen and pugilists on the platform – the desperate attempts to repel the assaults of the roughs who made most determined charges at the doors : the terror of the non-sporting passengers, for it was an ordinary train – women screaming and almost fainting with fright as swarms of big, broken-nosed men invaded the carriages in which they were peacefully seated".

Perry's seconds for the fight were Tass Parker and Jack McDonald. Despite being seen as the underdog, Sayers outperformed the Slasher and won in 10 rounds. Perry's tactics for the fight were criticized by one of the reporters on the scene, who pointed out that despite being slower on his feet than the highly mobile Sayers, the Slasher tried to force the pace of the fight instead of awaiting his opponent's attacks and relying on his powers as a counter-hitter.

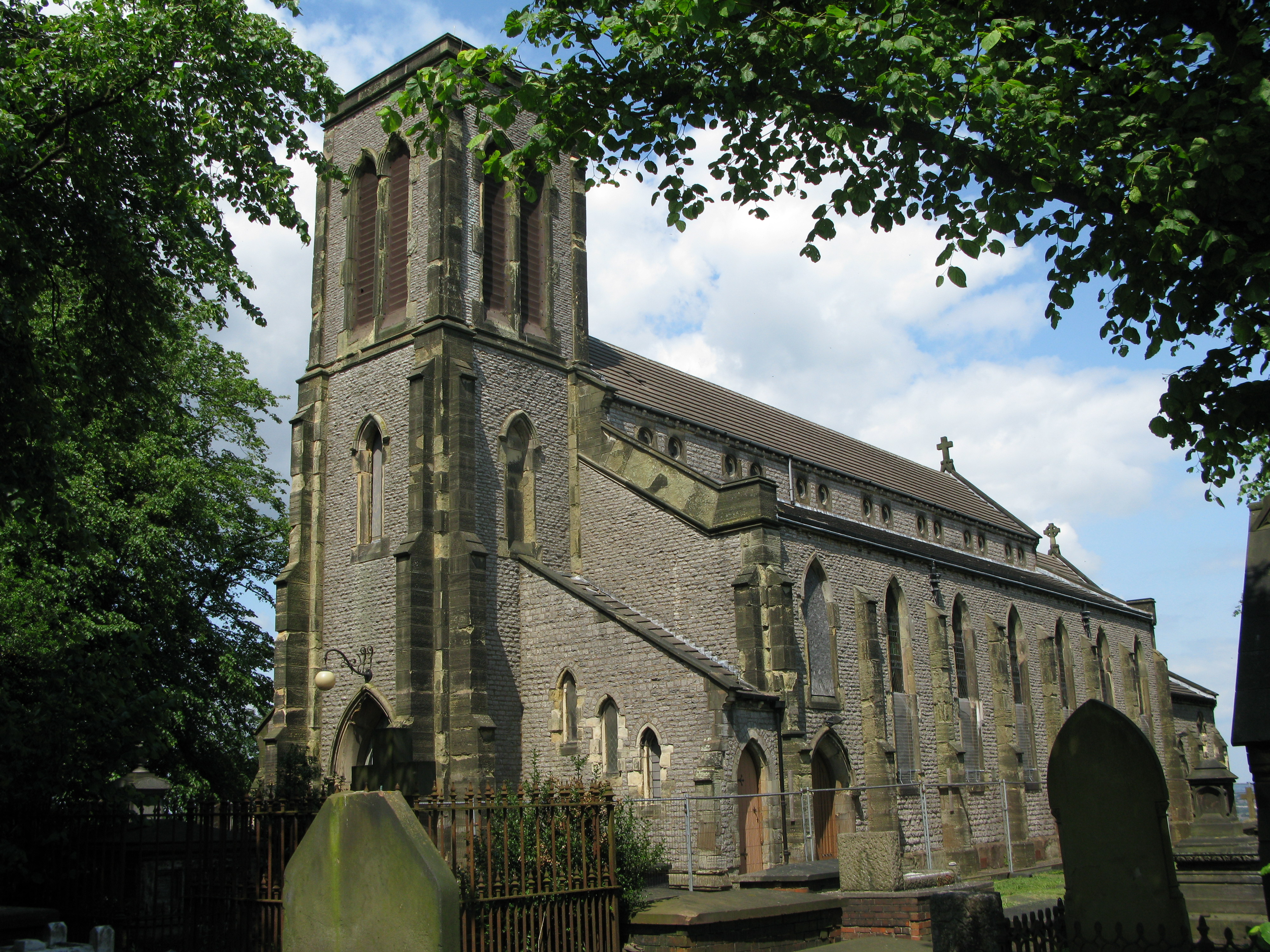
William Perry was buried at St John's Church, Kates Hill, Dudley

== Personal life ==
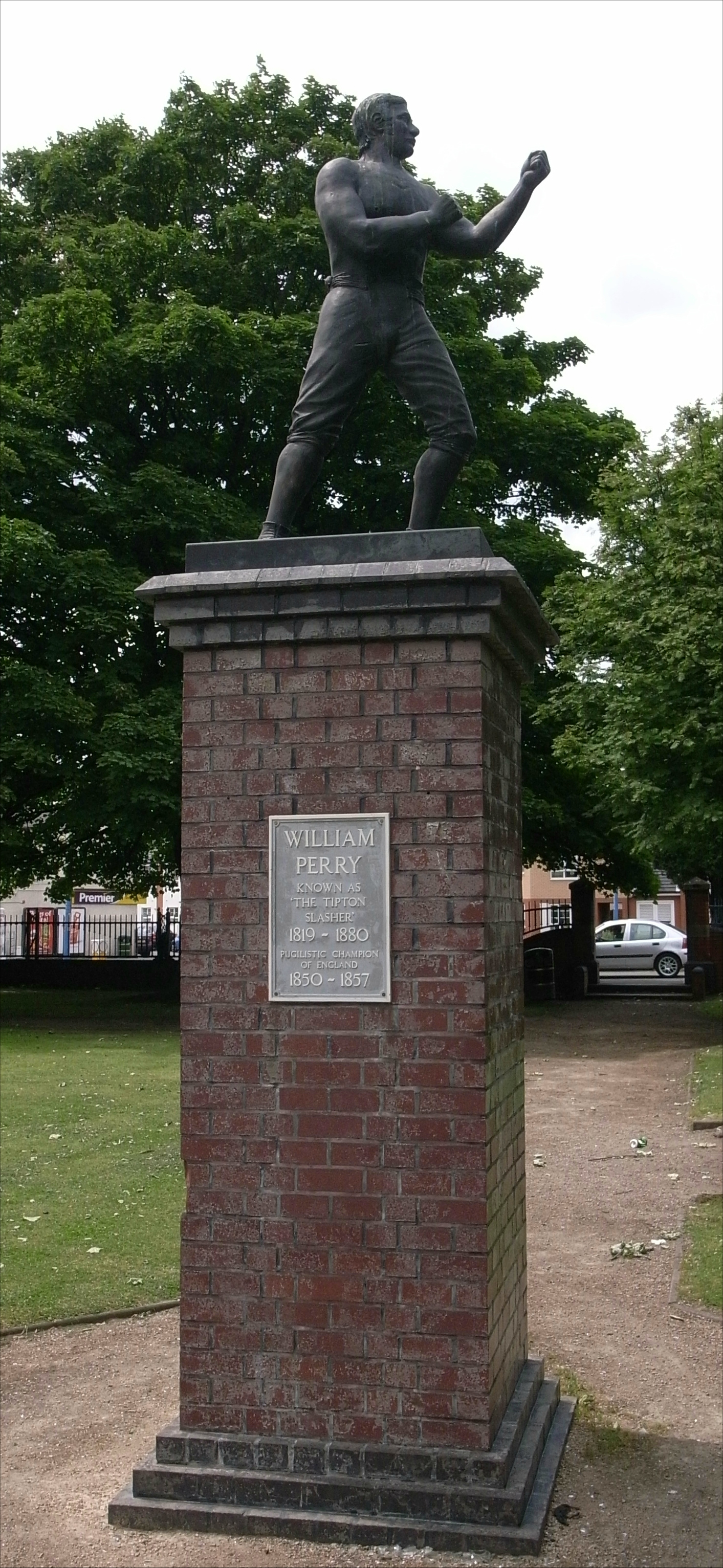
Statue of Perry in Tipton

Perry married Ann Maria Challingworth on 11 June 1851 at St Mary's Church, Pitstone. The couple had one child, William Edward Perry born on 3 December 1854. Around this time, until his defeat by Sayers, Perry was the landlord of the pub "The Champion of England" in Spon Lane, West Bromwich.

== After retirement, 1857–80 ==
After losing the title Champion of England in 1857 to Tom Sayers he became landlord of the Bricklayer's Arms, Walsall Road, Wolverhampton. According to some of his obituaries, he became a jobbing contractor, occasionally displaying his former skills in gloved encounters only.

He died at his home, Old Tollgate House, Bilston of alcoholism and pulmonary congestion on 24 December 1880 and was buried at St John's Church, Dudley.

== Perry as a fighter ==
Perry fought as a heavyweight. When preparing for his fight with Harry Broome in 1851, he was described as being 6 ft ½in tall and weighing 13st 7 lb. By the time of his last fight in 1857, his weight had increased to 14st 2 lb. Many accounts of Perry note that he had a "crooked leg" or was "knock-kneed" or his legs resembled the shape of the letter "K". Perry's fighting ability does not appear to have been affected by shape of his leg, however, one writer observing "those who had seen him fight knew well with what wonderful quickness and agility he could turn and wheel, pivot-like, on that crooked pin". At the time of the Paddock fight in 1850, he was described as having "one of the most robust, symmetrical, and herculean busts, with arms to match, that ever sculptor imagined, or gladiator exhibited".

== Career record ==
6 Wins, 3 Losses, 2 Draws
Result	Opponent	Date	Location	Duration
Win	Barney Dogherty	3 November 1835	Mortlake and Lechmere Common, London	14 rounds
Win	Ben Spilsbury	27 December 1836	Oldbury, West Midlands	19 rounds
Win	Jem Scunner	22–23 November 1837	Gornal and Wolverhampton	
Draw	Charles Freeman	6 December 1842	Sawbridgeworth	70 rounds
Loss	Charles Freeman	20 December 1842	Cliffe Marshes, Gravesend	38 rounds
Draw	Tass Parker	19 December 1843	Dartford Marshes	67 rounds
Win	Tass Parker	27 February 1844	Horley	133 rounds
Win	Tass Parker	4 August 1846	Lindrick Common	23 rounds
Win	Tom Paddock	17 December 1850	Woking Common,	27 Rounds
Loss	Harry Broome	29 September 1851	Mildenhall	15 rounds
Loss	Tom Sayers	16 June 1857	Isle of Grain	10 rounds

== Legacy ==
After Perry's grave fell into disrepair, the acting vicar of St John's, Rev. D.H.S. Mould launched a public appeal to raise funds for a new memorial stone, which was laid over the tomb in 1925.

A bronze statue by Bill Haynes stands in the Coronation Gardens, Tipton, yards away from the Fountain Inn public house, which was once his headquarters. The statue was unveiled on 3 May 1993.

The Fountain Inn received Grade II listed building status in 1984 on recognition of its association with Perry, who regularly fought fellow boatmen on the many local canals in order to be first through the lockgates.

The Tipton Slasher and Tom Sayers are mentioned in Robert Browning's poem A Likeness.

The novelist, David Christie Murray, includes some anecdotes of the Tipton Slasher in his autobiography The Making of a Novelist.

Arthur Conan Doyle's story "The Croxley Master" describes a boxing match in which a young medical man defeats a veteran boxer with a "K-shaped" leg like Perry's.
