= Winchester Science Centre =

Educational centre in Hampshire, England

- Interactive map of Winchester Science Centre
- Former names: INTECH (1986–2002); INTECH Science Centre (2002-2013)
- Address: Winchester Science Centre and Planetarium, Telegraph Way, Winchester SO21 1HZ; Winchester; United Kingdom
- Location: Morn Hill, Chilcomb, England
- Coordinates: 51.05983°N 1.26544°W
- Operator: Wonderseekers

Construction
- Opened: 28 October 2002

Website
- www.winchestersciencecentre.org

Winchester Science Centre (known as INTECH Science Centre until 2013) is a hands-on educational science, technology centre and research centre located at Morn Hill near Chilcomb, three miles from the city of Winchester in Hampshire, England. The centre houses a range of interactive exhibits, aimed at a core audience of children aged 5–12 years old and has over 185,000 annual visitors. The dome's planetarium seats 176 and is the UK's largest standalone planetarium.

The centre is operated by Wonderseekers, a registered charity in England and Wales.

== History ==
INTECH (a portmanteau of "Interactive Technology") was founded in 1986 as a response to a local shortage of scientists, engineers and technicians, in a disused canteen at King's School on Romsey Road, Winchester. By the late 1990s, the centre had grown in popularity and began to look for a larger premises to meet increasing demand.

In 2002, INTECH relocated to the present-day site at Morn Hill at a cost of £10 million. The new 3,500 square metre, purpose-built centre was funded partly through the Millennium Commission, NTL, IBM, the DfES and DTI, SEEDA and Hampshire County Council. The centre was opened by Prince Philip, Duke of Edinburgh on 28 October 2002.

INTECH re-opened as Winchester Science Centre in October 2013.

== Exhibits ==
The centre has two floors of hands-on science exhibits and a planetarium with a programme of full-dome films and presenter-led shows.

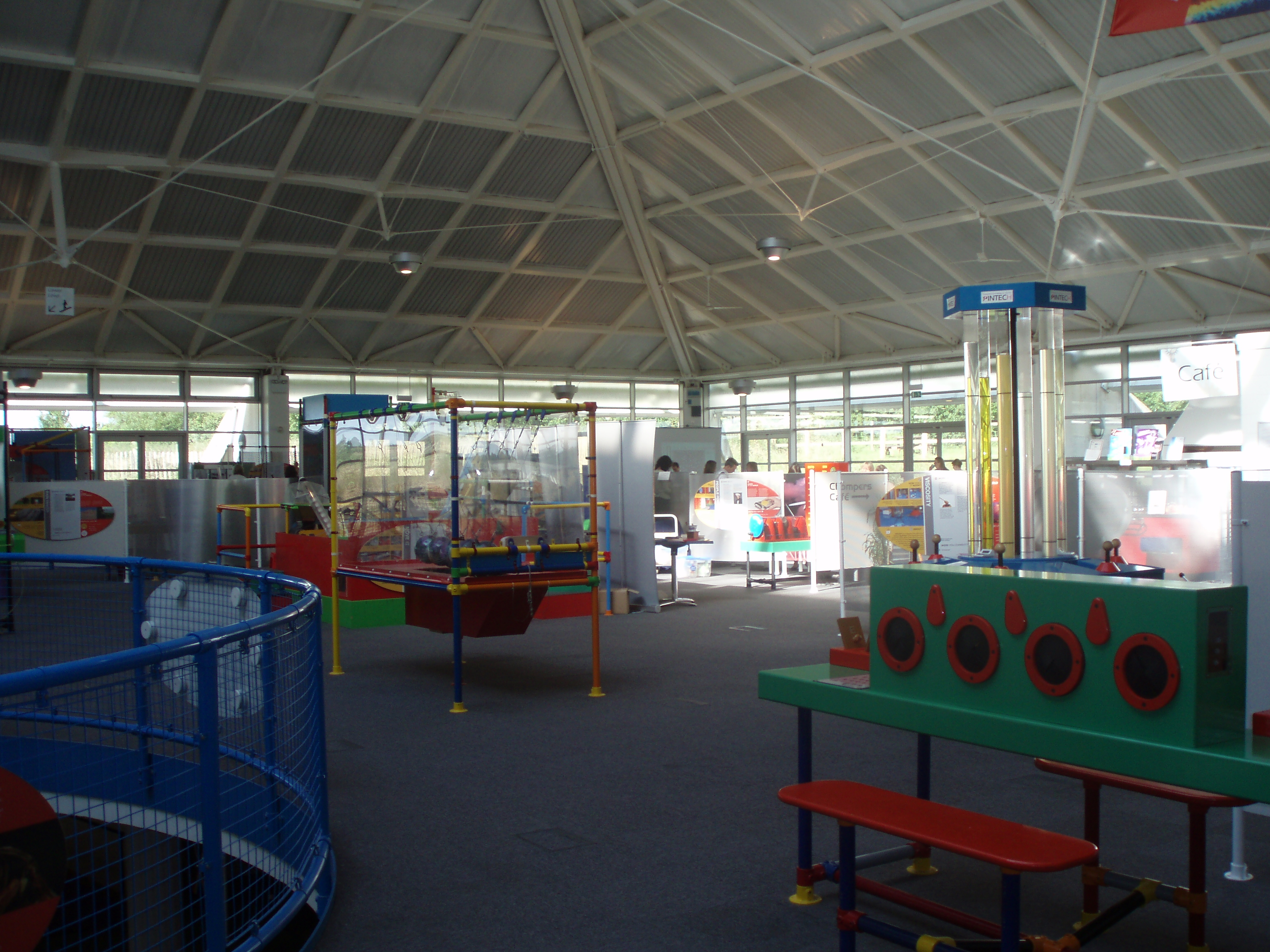
Hands-on exhibits on the centre's first floor.

== See also ==
- List of science centres in Europe
