= West Hill Cemetery, Winchester =

Cemetery in Hampshire, England

West Hill Cemetery
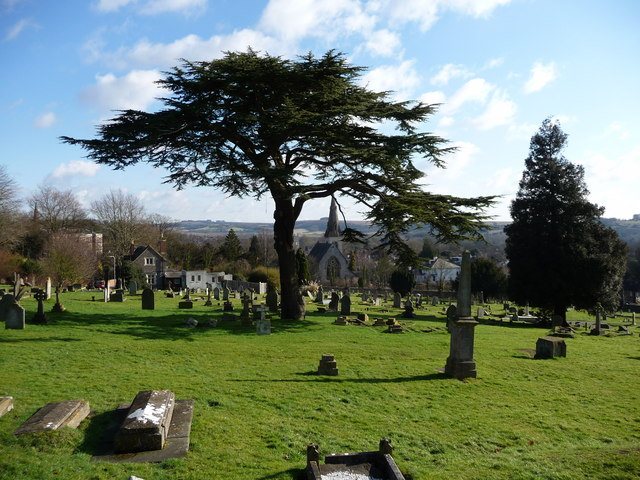
- Interactive map of West Hill Cemetery

Details
- Location: Winchester, Hampshire, England
- Coordinates: 51°03′38.44800″N 1°19′27.33600″W

West Hill Cemetery is a cemetery to the west of the city centre of Winchester in the English county of Hampshire. Opened in the 1840s, the cemetery became the principal place of burial for the city. However by the 1900s it was almost full, and the Magdalen Hill Cemetery, to the east of the city, opened in 1914 as a replacement.

The cemetery comprises 13 acres (5.3 ha) of land. The grade II listed perimeter wall, which fronts onto St James' Lane and Sparkford Road, includes red brick piers with stone caps and wrought iron railings and gates. The cemetery formerly had two chapels, one for the Church of England and the second for other denominations, together with a gate lodge. Both chapels were demolished in the 1920s, but the gate lodge still stands.

The cemetery contains the grave of Charles Freeman, a circus entertainer and bare-knuckle boxer known as the "American Giant", who died of tuberculosis in Winchester in 1845. His grave is marked by a 10 ft (3.0 m) high stone obelisk erected in 1860. The cemetery also contains war graves from World War I (115) and World War II (4).

Winchester Cemetery Act 1840
- Act of Parliament
- Parliament of the United Kingdom
- Long title: An Act for establishing a General Cemetery for the Interment of the Dead in the City and Borough of Winchester in the County of Southampton.
- Citation: 3 & 4 Vict. c. viii

Dates
- Royal assent: 23 March 1840

Other legislation
- Repealed by: Winchester Corporation Act 1952

Status: Repealed

Text of statute as originally enacted

Initially run by the Winchester Cemetery Company, which was established by an act of Parliament, the Winchester Cemetery Act 1840 (3 & 4 Vict. c. viii), the cemetery has been managed by Winchester City Council since 1958, and is now closed for burials. It is managed to allow its chalk downland to flourish as a habitat for insects and reptiles. A footpath across the cemetery provide access to the adjacent University of Winchester.
