= Alex Mitchell (British journalist) =

British journalist

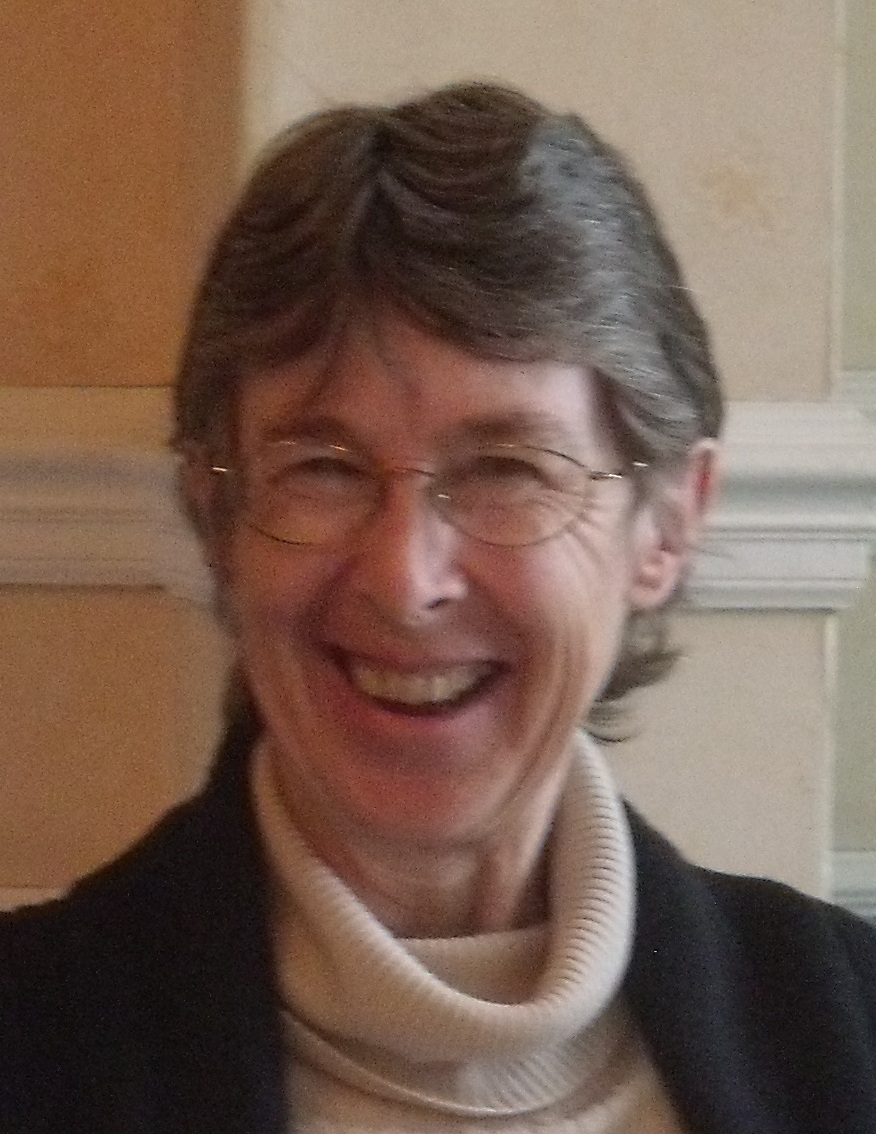
- Born: Ruth Alex Beale; 23 February 1947; Winchester, Hampshire, England
- Died: 26 November 2010 (aged 63); London, England
- Education: Eastacre School; St Swithun's School, Winchester; Winchester County High School for Girls; Eastleigh Technical College
- Occupation: Journalist
- Employer(s): Crusade and Third Way magazines
- Notable work: "Now We Sing a Harvest Song" (hymn)
- Spouse: John Mitchell (1980–2010)
- Children: 2 sons

Ruth Alex Mitchell (née Beale, 23 February 1947 – 26 November 2010) was a British journalist who was the "editor and driving force behind the Christian current affairs magazine Third Way". She edited Third Way for five of its first six years and "established its reputation as making a significant contribution to Christian social thinking." Her hymn "Now We Sing a Harvest Song" is in the BBC's popular hymnal Come and Praise.

== Early life ==
She was born in Winchester, Hampshire, England and was educated at Eastacre School, St Swithun's School, Winchester County High School for Girls and Eastleigh Technical College before going to work at the Council of Europe in Strasbourg. In 1966 she attended the London mission of the American evangelist Billy Graham and found it life-changing. After working for the Church Army for four years, she went to All Nations Christian College for two years to train as a missionary. During this time, three of her poems were published in Making Eden Grow, an anthology published by the Scripture Union. In 1973, she joined the staff of Crusade, a Christian monthly magazine.

== Third Way ==
Third Way was launched at the beginning of 1977 as a fortnightly sister magazine to Crusade to provide a biblical perspective on a wide range of issues. The new magazine reflected a growing concern amongst Evangelical Christians about social issues, particularly after the First International Congress on World Evangelization held in Lausanne, Switzerland in 1974. She joined Third Way at its launch as its assistant editor and became editor the next year, inheriting a fortnightly journal that was losing money heavily. She switched to a monthly circulation, cut costs, enlisted help from a team of volunteers and "brought the magazine back from the brink of closure."

Under her editorship, Third Way contributors included clergy who subsequently achieved high office, such as George Carey, who became Archbishop of Canterbury and N. T. "Tom" Wright who became Bishop of Durham as well as established evangelical leaders such as John Stott, David Watson and George Hoffman, the founder of Tearfund.

The former British Prime Minister Edward Heath wrote an exclusive introduction to the Brandt Report, the report of the Independent Commission on international development chaired by former West German Chancellor Willy Brandt. From the United States she attracted such diverse contributors as Jim Wallis, founder of the radical movement Sojourners and Chuck Colson, the Watergate scandal conspirator who became a Christian and founded the Prison Fellowship. From developing countries, interviewees ranged from Mother Teresa to President Godfrey Binaisa of Uganda.

Dr John Stott, an important leader in world Evangelicalism, said during her editorship that "Third Way is becoming indispensable reading for those who want to think Christianly about contemporary issues." At her wedding in 1980 to John Mitchell, then-Director of the World Development Movement, John Stott said in his sermon that "under your editorship Third Way has been a blessing to hundreds of thousands."

== Hymns ==
Mitchell made an important contribution to the Jubilate Hymns word group that produced Hymns for Today's Church, the Evangelical Anglican and Free Church hymn book published in 1982. She was the only woman and the only non-ordained member of the group. Her own hymn "Now We Sing a Harvest Song" is included in the BBC's popular hymnbook Come and Praise.

== Later life ==
After leaving Third Way at the end of 1982 on the birth of her first son, Mitchell continued her involvement with social issues at the national level through her active board membership of the Shaftesbury Project on Christian Involvement in Society and the London Institute for Contemporary Christianity.

Mitchell moved to Washington DC in 1991 when her husband John left his job as Director of the World Development Movement to take up a job with the World Bank. For ten years, she was the volunteer administrator of the many Alpha courses, which introduce people to the basics of the Christian faith, run by Washington's Fourth Presbyterian Church. In 2008, Mitchell and her husband returned to the UK and a year later she was diagnosed with cancer.
