= Chilcomb =

Village and parish in Hampshire, England

Coordinates: 51.0534°N 1.2767°W

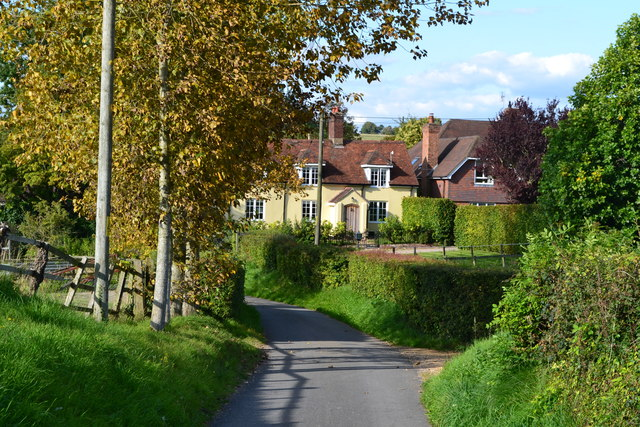
- The village of Chilcomb, Hampshire, seen from the south

- Location within Hampshire
- Population: 91
- OS grid reference: SU507284
- District: City of Winchester
- Shire county: Hampshire
- Region: South East
- Country: England
- Sovereign state: United Kingdom
- Post town: WINCHESTER
- Postcode district: SO21
- Dialling code: 01962
- Police: Hampshire and Isle of Wight
- Fire: Hampshire and Isle of Wight
- Ambulance: South Central
- UK Parliament: Winchester

Chilcomb is a small village and civil parish in the English county of Hampshire 3 miles (4.8 km) east of Winchester and includes the South Downs Way long-distance footpath.

== History ==
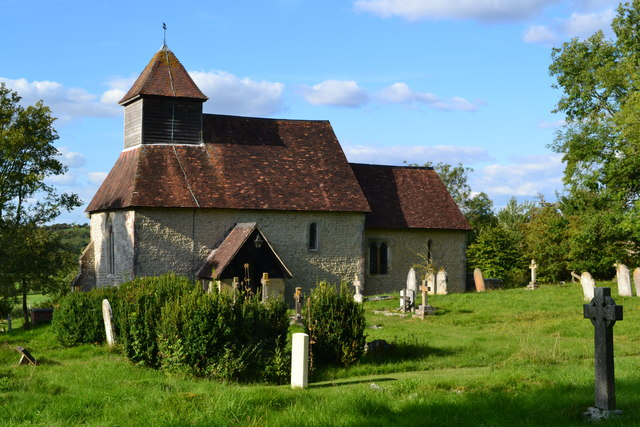
St Andrew's Church, Chilcomb, Hampshire

The nearby bowl barrow on Telegraph Hill along the South Downs Way just east of the village centre shows prehistoric settlement.

The village has a small Norman 1120-40 church which has a graveyard with views over Winchester. Church services take place at 0930 on the second Sunday of each Month and there is an annual church féte. The listed buildings are few but include The Manor House and the thatched cottage. The church has three wall monuments to Edward Hooker, Henry Crosswell and Dorethea Goodman.At nearby Chilcomb Down a prehistoric field system is visible from the air

== Geography and economy ==
The village itself is nestled in a bowl south of the River Itchen surrounded by chalk downs. The north of the parish is crossed by the A31 between Winchester and Alresford. The M3 motorway runs close to the west of the parish. Southampton is approximately 12 miles away. The village is based around a no through road which ends at the top of the hill. The INTECH science centre is located on the northern edge of the parish.

=== Geology ===
Chilcomb lies within the heart of the Winchester anticline, an up-fold in the rocks with older beds exposed in the centre. This is surrounded by outcrops of successively younger beds forming an enclosing ring of steep hills broken only by the Itchen Valley. In the centre a valley running east–west from Chilcomb to Bar End lies on the Zig Zag Chalk formation, grey chalk of Cenomanian age. This is surrounded successively by narrow, elliptical belts of the much harder Holywell Nodular Chalk, the New Pit Chalk (forming St. Catherine's Hill) and the Lewes Nodular Chalk, forming the peaks of Twyford Down and Deacon hill to the south, Winchester's West Hill and Sleepers Hill to the west, Magdalen Hill Down to the north and Telegraph Hill to the east. Beyond lies a further ring of the Seaford Chalk.

== Chilcomb range ==
Chilcomb range is a Ministry of Defence range to the south of the village. The range has 12 lanes and firing points from 50m to 500m. Targets are both manual and automatic with the ETR coffins in front of the mantlet.

The range is used by British Army and Royal Navy units for personal weapon training in daylight and at night.

== See also ==
- List of civil parishes in Hampshire
