= Harry Broome =

English bare-knuckle boxer (1826–1865)

Personal information
- Nationality: British
- Born: Henry Alfred Broome; 1826 Birmingham, England
- Died: 2 November 1865 (aged 38–39) Soho, London, England
- Height: 5 ft 10 in (1.78 m); Varies slightly in other records
- Weight: 165 lb (75 kg)*, *weight average in later career *Early career fought as welterweight career weight range, 136–178

Boxing career
- Stance: Orthodox; Right handed Used London Prize Ring Rules

Boxing record
- Total fights: 7 * major professional bouts only
- Wins: 4
- Losses: 1
- Draws: 2

Henry Alfred Broome (1826 – 2 November 1865) was a boxer from the bare-knuckle fighting era who became heavyweight champion of England in September, 1851 when he defeated fellow Englishman William Perry in Mildenhall, England. He lost the title in May, 1856 to Tom Paddock in Suffolk.

== Early life ==
Born in Birmingham in 1826, Harry Broome was the younger brother of undefeated English boxer Johnny Broome who influenced him to become a boxer as well.

== Boxing career ==
Though only 17, Broome had two London bouts in 1842, an exhibition and a win against Byng Stocks and Hal Mitchell, which may have been considered amateur bouts, as they were fought with gloves.

With the guidance of his brother Johnny, Harry Broome's professional fighting career began on 11 October 1843 when he defeated Fred Mason at Northfleet, Kent, for a total purse of £100, £50 per side. One source quoted his weight, likely with accuracy, as only 136 pounds or 9 st 10 lb (62 kg), a light welterweight, and his age as barely eighteen. According to one report, the two fought "a well contested battle of eighty-one minutes, during which thirty-nine rounds were fought". Broome did his best work, near the end of the match, most frequently leading with his left. The fighting was fierce from the opening round, and both men left the ring exhausted.

In 1844 he was matched with Joe Rowe for £50 a side. The bout took place on 10 December 1844 at Greenhithe, Kent but after a desperate battle lasting 90 minutes and 81 rounds, a riot by the crowd broke the ring and ended the bout. Both men landed blows, but Rowe may have taken a slight lead at the end. Broome subsequently beat Rowe in a rearranged fight on 13 May 1845. Both bouts were fought in the welterweight range, and according to one source were for the English welterweight title.

Broome's next fight was against Ben Terry of Birmingham in Shrivenham, England. Still fighting as a welterweight, Broome was said to have weighed around 10 st 4 lb (65 kg), or 144 pounds. The bout took place on 3 February 1846 and ended being declared a draw after an hour of fighting when a furious dispute broke out over a claimed "foul" which led to the referee fleeing the scene of the fight, unable to render a decision. Broome received only £5 for the bout.

=== Heavyweight champion of England, 1851 ===
Broome's career reached a peak in 1851 when, fighting above his weight, he defeated William Perry, the "Tipton Slasher". The match took place at Mildenhall, England on 29 September 1851 for the impressive purse of £400. In the third round, Perry fell heavily to the ground. In the seventh, Perry hit the ground hard as he was thrown by Broome, and the heavy man was thrown at least once in subsequent rounds, a wrestling tactic allowed under London Prize Ring Rules. Perry was fought down after a scrambling rally in the fourteenth. After some exchanges in the fifteenth round, Broome missed and slipped onto his knees. Perry seized him by his right arm and dragged him as if to get him up, striking him "intemperately", on the side of the head while he was down. Broome was subsequently awarded victory for the foul of striking Broome while he was on his knees. The outcome of this fight enabled Broome to claim the title of heavyweight champion of England, and take the championship belt.

=== Defences of English championship, 1853 ===
Broome (right) and Orme, 1853

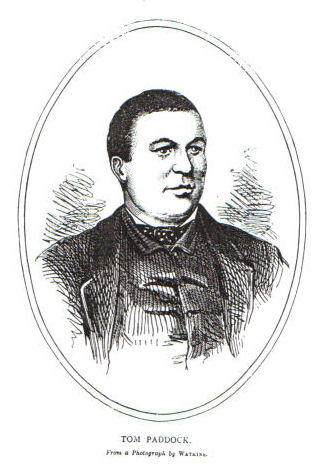
Tom Paddock

Broome defended the heavyweight championship of England only once successfully against Henry Orme on a warm 18 April 1853, winning in a thirty-one round fight in Brandon, Suffolk, that lasted 2 hours, and eighteen minutes. The substantial purse was £500 with £250 per side, and the audience numbered in the thousands. Broome was roughly two inches taller than his adversary, but described as fleshy and not as fit in appearance, with the skin "loose on his arms". He may have lost some conditioning during his work as a pub keeper between fights. He likely fought as a light heavyweight at best, as his competition weight was not known to exceed 175. Regardless of his condition, the bout was described as one of his best, and he fought convincingly.

In August 1853, Broome wrote to Bell's Life in London and Sporting Chronicle announcing his retirement from boxing and that he was pulling out of an agreed re-match with William Perry.

Broome had two fights scheduled with Tom Paddock in February and March 1855, but Paddock failed to show for either bout.

==== Loss of English championship ====
On his second defense of the English title, Broome lost a fifty-one round match to Paddock at Bentley in Sussex on 19 May 1856, in Manningtree, England in one hour, three minutes. Broome was losing favor somewhat or the bout was less well attended, but the purse was only £200 a side, a substantial sum, but a drop from the purse of Broome's first two championship wins. Boxing was not sanctioned by most English cities, which is why remote locations were required. To avoid the police, the spot found for the fight was on a piece of meadow ground in a hollow where the contestants and supporters could scarcely be seen. Broome had lost as much as 40 pounds for the contest, but did not appear as muscular as he had in earlier contests. His determination was substantial, but his stamina was described as inadequate against the vigor and strength of his opponent. By the 48th round, the left side of Broome's face was quite swollen, and his left eye nearly swollen shut. Broome fell in the 49th from a blow to his left ear. In the brutal affair, Broome was down again in the 50th. In the 51st and final round, Broome was down from a right to the chest, and though he tried to rise, his second threw in the sponge. Though the betting favorite early on, Broome was described as "completely disabled" and presented a "shocking spectacle" by the end of the fight. He retired immediately after the disabling loss.

== After retirement ==
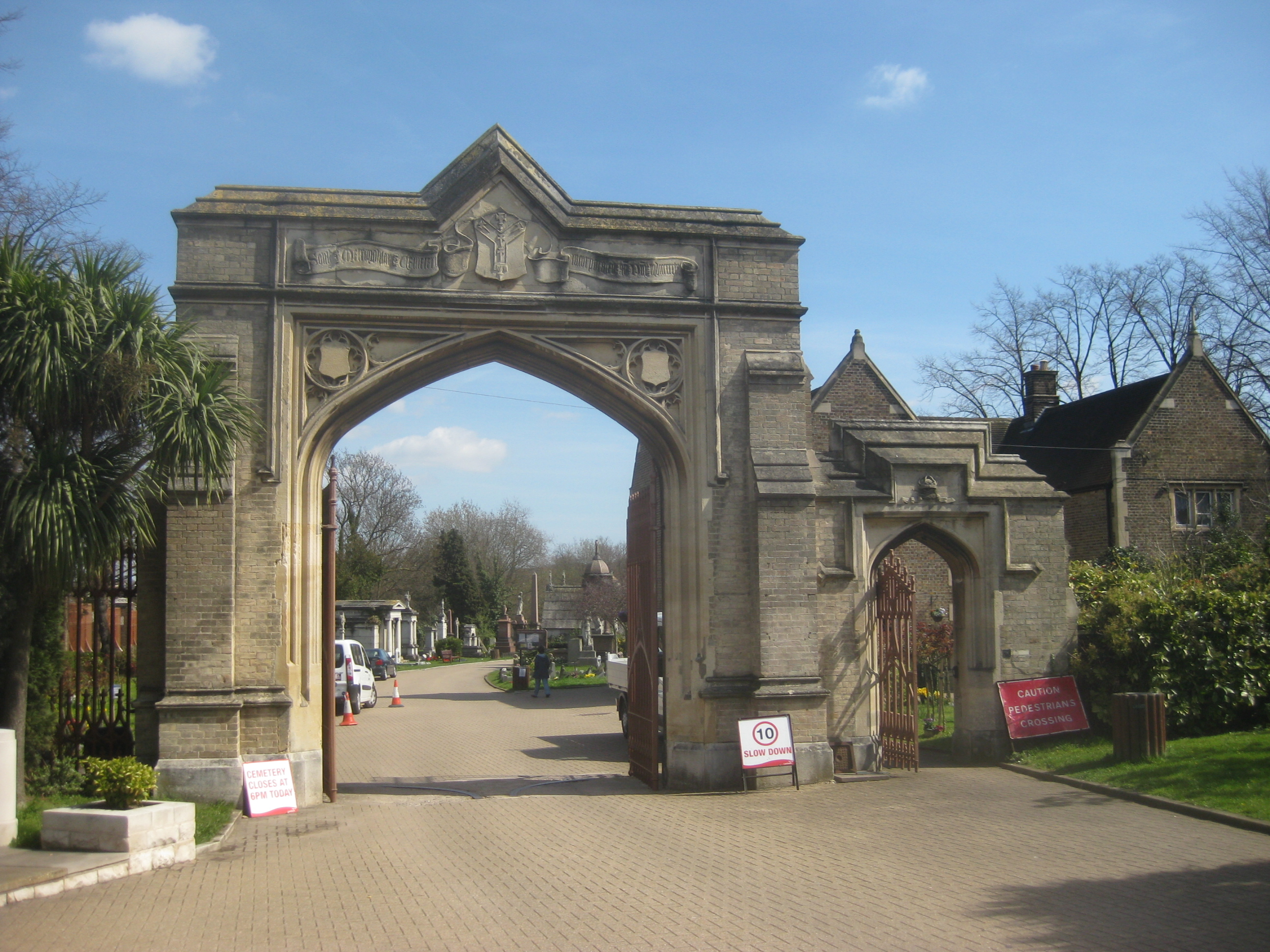
Norwood Cemetery

After finishing his fighting career he kept a pub in Portsmouth and later kept the "Crown and Cushion" in Little Russell Street, London. In later years, he was often found wagering money at race meetings which may have contributed to his poverty in later life.

Near the end of his life, he suffered for months from lung disease and "dropsy", now known as edema. After being released from hospital care, he died in poverty due to his medical expenses, on the evening of 2 November 1865 at his residence on 30 Frith Street, in London's Soho. He was survived by his wife, who cared for him during his illness, and two children. He was buried in Norwood Cemetery in the same tomb as his brother, Johnny Broome, requiring patrons to pay the sum of £4 for the burial.

== Career record ==
4 Wins, 1 Loss, 2 Draws
Result	Opponent	Date	Location	Duration	Notes
Win	Fred Mason	11 October 1843	Northfleet, Kent	39 rounds	Welterweight championship
Draw	Joe Rowe	10 December 1844	Greenhithe, Kent	81 rounds	Welterweight championship
Win	Joe Rowe	13 May 1845	Ensham Common	27 rounds	Welterweight championship
Draw	Ben Terry	3 February 1846	Shrivenham, Berks	49 rounds	Crowd rioted due to foul, referee fled
Win	William Perry	29 September 1851	Mildenhall, Suffolk	15 rounds	Won English Heavyweight championship
Win	Harry Orme	18 April 1853	Brandon, Suffolk	31 rounds	Defended English championship
Loss	Tom Paddock	19 May 1856	Bentley, Sussex	51 rounds	Lost English championship, retired

== See also ==
- List of heavyweight bare-knuckle boxing champions, includes nearly all bare-knuckle all England champions
- List of bare-knuckle boxers
