= Third Way (magazine) =

British Christian magazine

- Cover of October 2010 issue
- Frequency: Monthly
- Format: A4, full-colour
- Publisher: Thirty Press Ltd (1977–85) Elm House (1985–87) Third Way Trust (1987–2007) Hymns Ancient & Modern Ltd (2007–16)
- First issue: 1977
- Final issue: April 2016
- Country: United Kingdom
- Based in: London
- Language: English
- ISSN: 0309-3492

Third Way was a British magazine which invited Christian thinkers and writers to analyse or comment on the political, social and cultural issues of the day. Notable columnists over the years included Jeremy Vine, Paul Vallely and Mike Riddell. According to the Times, it was 'noted for giving a serious Christian perspective on topics ranging from the Bible to politics, environment to the arts'. The magazine was not affiliated with either the minor British political party Third Way, or with the centrist 'Third Way' policies of Tony Blair and Bill Clinton. Originally avowedly evangelical in its Christian alignment, it latterly sat comfortably alongside the Greenbelt Festival and the satirical website Ship of Fools.

In 1974, thousands of Christians meeting at the First International Congress on World Evangelization held in Lausanne, Switzerland signed a covenant pledging to commit themselves to bringing the Christian gospel to bear on social issues. This sparked a lively debate in the Christian monthly magazine Crusade between David Sheppard, later Bishop of Liverpool, and John Pridmore. The debate inspired the editor of Crusade, John Capon, to launch Third Way as a fortnightly magazine in January 1977, offering a Christian perspective on current affairs and the arts. Its title referred to an observation by the theologian Os Guinness in his 1973 book The Dust of Death: 'How often in the contemporary discussion a sensitive modern man [sic] knows that he cannot accept either of the polarised alternatives offered to him. In Christianity, however, there can be a Third Way, a true middle ground which has a basis, is never compromise and is far from silent.' Third Way's first editor was Derek Williams. In 1978, he was succeeded by Alex Beale, later Alex Mitchell, who made the magazine a monthly.

A major innovation in May 1993 was the feature High Profile, a regular series of in-depth interviews of influential public figures, presented as question and answer without editorial comment. The series was inaugurated with an interview of the then Lord Chancellor, James Mackay, Baron Mackay of Clashfern, shortly followed by an interview of the then Shadow Home Secretary, Tony Blair. A number of scoops followed over the next 23 years: one of the first interviews of Gerry Adams published in Britain after the ban on talking to members of Sinn Féin was lifted in 1996, followed immediately by one of Ian Paisley; Noam Chomsky; Mary McAleese, then President of the Republic of Ireland; Maya Angelou; Thom Yorke (which the Observer described as 'an incredible scoop'); Tracey Emin; Daniel Libeskind; Julie Burchill; Khalid Mish'al, then the political head of Hamas; Camille Paglia; Amartya Sen; Paulo Coelho; Margaret Atwood; Annie Lennox; Werner Herzog; Patti Smith; Richard Branson; Marina Abramović; Jeremy Paxman; Slavoj Žižek; and Gloria Steinem, among more than 200 others.

At its peak, the magazine had an estimated readership of 12,000 worldwide.

In July 2007, Third Way was acquired by Hymns Ancient & Modern Ltd, which owns the Church Times. The closure of the magazine was announced in February 2016, with the April 2016 issue being the last. The High Profile series has been continued since – somewhat irregularly – as a standalone feature on a dedicated website.
