= Ben Caunt =

English boxer (1815–1861)

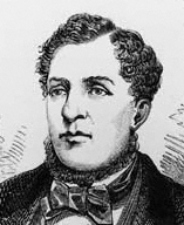
- Ben Caunt, by unknown engraver

Personal information
- Nicknames: Torkard Giant, Big Ben
- Nationality: English
- Born: 22 March 1815 Hucknall Torkard, Nottinghamshire, England
- Died: 10 September 1861 (aged 46)
- Height: 6 ft 2 in (1.88 m)
- Weight: 18 st (250 lb; 110 kg)

Boxing career

Ben Caunt (22 March 1815 – 10 September 1861) was a 19th-century English bare-knuckle boxer who became the heavyweight boxing champion known as the "Torkard Giant" and "Big Ben".

== Early life ==
Caunt was born on 22 March 1815 in Hucknall Torkard, in Nottinghamshire, England. He stood 6 feet 2 inches (1.88 m) tall and weighed 18 stone. He was said to be strong, durable, and willing yet also slow and clumsy. His early boxing career is not well known, but he did defeat several minor local opponents at the age of 18.

== Boxing career ==
In 1834 he beat George Graham (of Lincolnshire). On 21 July 1835, Caunt boxed William "Bendigo" Thompson and was disqualified for an alleged foul striking Thompson while he was sitting in his corner.

On 17 August 1837, Caunt fought and beat William Butler at Stoneyford in Derbyshire, and on 4 November Bill Boniford at Sunrise Hill.

On 3 April 1838, Caunt again fought William Thompson on Skipworth Common, and after 76 rounds Thompson was disqualified for going down without being struck; Caunt claimed the Heavyweight Championship of England but this was not generally accepted.

On 24 June of the same year, Caunt was scheduled to again fight William Thompson but the bout was cancelled.

On 26 October 1840, Caunt defeated Bill Brassey at Six Mile Bottom in 101 rounds.

On 2 February 1841, Caunt fought Nick Ward on Crookham Common for the Heavyweight Championship of England where the crowd forced the referee to disqualify Caunt for an alleged blow striking Ward while he was down.

Caunt avenged this defeat on 11 May of the same year, defeating Ward in 35 rounds at Long Marston to become the Heavyweight Champion of England. On 10 September 1841 Caunt sailed to America to challenge Tom Hyer to a world championship bout, but Hyer never replied. Caunt returned to England on 10 March 1842 with the "American Giant" Charles Freeman.

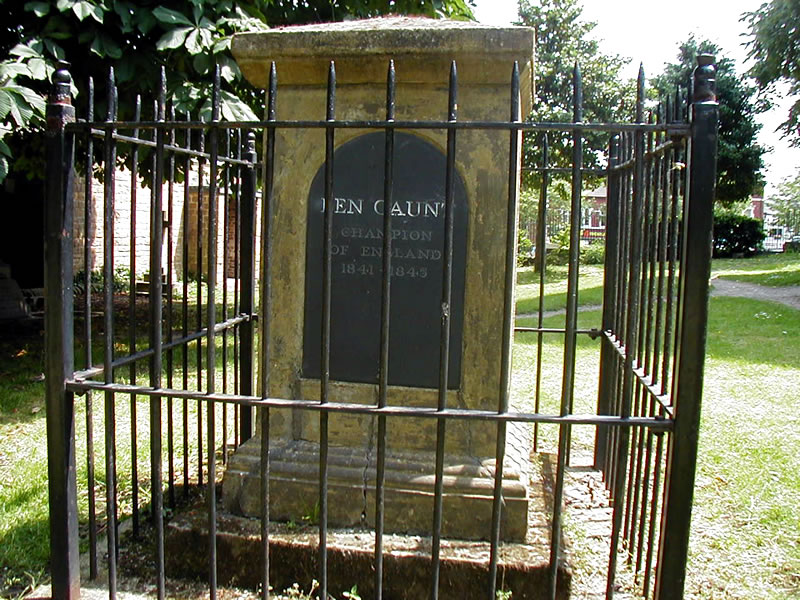
Memorial to Ben Caunt in St Mary Magdalene churchyard, Hucknall

In 1845 he was challenged for the English heavyweight title by William Thompson. On 9 September Caunt lost at Stony Stratford, with a disputable decision after 93 rounds where it was alleged that Caunt went down without a blow striking him. Caunt denied this accusation and announced his retirement, only to return for a final attempt at the heavyweight crown 12 years later.

== Retirement and attempted comeback ==
Between 1845 and 1851, Caunt worked as farm labourer and then became the landlord of the Coach and Horses pub at St Martin's Lane, a business that made him very prosperous until the premises were destroyed in a fire that killed two of his children.

In his final fight on 21 September 1857, Caunt fought Nat Langham at Home Circuit, where after 60 rounds both men were too exhausted to continue and a draw was declared.

== Death and legacy ==
Caunt died of pneumonia on 10 September 1861 at an address in St Martin's Lane in London. He is buried outside the north transept of the Parish Church of St Mary Magdalene in Hucknall close to the grave of his two children who died in the Coach and Horses fire.

It is held by some that Big Ben, the hour bell in the clock-tower of the Palace of Westminster, is named after this English heavyweight champion. However, this is unlikely given the many newspaper reports of the time which establish that the name is associated with Sir Benjamin Hall who was at the time First Commissioner of Works and, as such, responsible for overseeing completion of the Palace of Westminster, including installation of the bell. At 6 ft 4 in (1.93 m) tall, Hall, was a tall man and was also known as 'Big Ben'.
