= Tom Paddock =

English boxer (1822–1863)

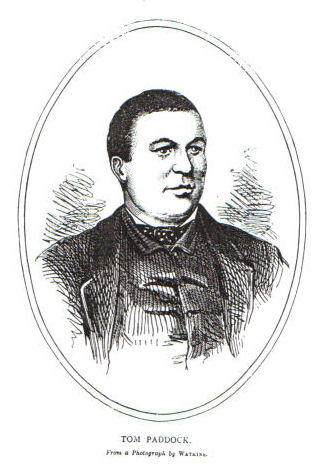

Personal information
- Nickname: Redditch Needlepointer
- Nationality: English
- Born: Thomas Paddock; 1822 Redditch, Worcestershire
- Died: 30 June 1863 Marylebone, London
- Height: 5 ft 10.5 in (1.79 m)
- Weight: Heavyweight

Boxing career

Boxing record
- Total fights: 16
- Wins: 11
- Losses: 5

Tom Paddock, born Thomas Paddock (c. 1822, Redditch – 30 June 1863) also known as the Redditch Needlepointer was a champion English bare-knuckle boxer in the early Victorian era.

Tom was baptised on 25 August 1822 in Redditch, Worcestershire, England, the son of George Paddock and Elizabeth (née Morris). Brought up on a farm, he was noted to have developed a size and endurance that served him well in his career as a boxer.

His professional career in boxing started in 1844; at the time he was just under six feet tall and weighed twelve stone. Between then and 1850 he was largely undefeated in the boxing ring, and gained a reputation not only for his courage but for his foul tactics and uncontrollable temper. It was William Thompson of Nottingham who spoilt his clean record in 1850 in Mildenhall, Suffolk.

In 1851 a fight against Harry Poulson in Belper ended in a riot when both men were jailed. Both served ten months hard labour.

Three years later Paddock challenged both Harry Broome and Bill Perry to a Heavyweight Championship of England bout but both turned it down. Paddock then claimed himself as the Heavyweight Champion of England by default, though this was not generally recognised until 1856 following fifty-one rounds in the ring against Harry Broome in Manningtree. However, his victory was short-lived; he lost the title later the same year to Bill Perry. He twice attempted to regain the title, but was unsuccessful.

Paddock's last fight took place in 1860 against Sam Hurst, for the championship of England. He died of heart disease on 30 June 1863 in Marylebone.

A book on Paddock's life is currently being penned by Tom Podmore, a Nottingham-based writer originally from Redditch.
