= William Thompson (boxer) =

Boxer from Nottingham, England

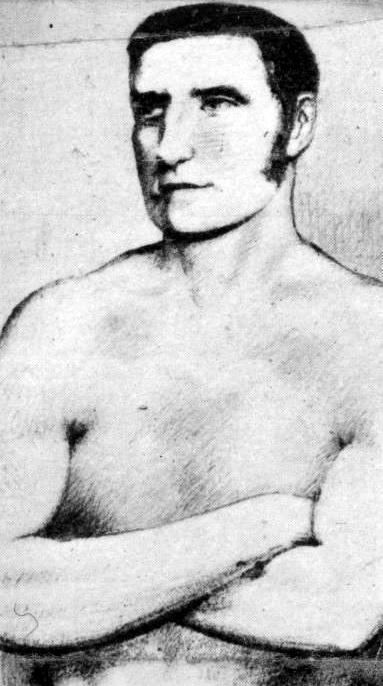

Personal information
- Nicknames: Bendigo, Bendego (in period newspapers)
- Born: 11 October 1811 Trinity Walk, Nottingham, England
- Died: 23 August 1880 (aged 68) Beeston, Nottinghamshire, England
- Height: 5 ft 9.75 in (1.77 m)
- Weight: averaged 165 lb (75 kg), weight range 164 to 168 lb (74–76 kg)

Boxing career
- Stance: Southpaw; Used London Prize Ring Rules after 1838

Boxing record
- Total fights: 20
- Wins: 19

William Abednego Thompson (11 October 1811 – 23 August 1880), also known as Bendigo Thompson and mononymously as Bendigo, was an English bare-knuckle boxer who won the heavyweight championship of England from James Burke on 12 February 1839. He was inducted into The Ring magazine Hall of Fame in 1955, the International Boxing Hall of Fame in 1991 and the Bare Knuckle Boxing Hall of Fame in 2011. His nickname of "Bendigo" lives on in the name of a city and creek in Australia.

== Early life ==
Born in New Yard, now Trinity Walk, Nottingham on 11 October 1811, Thompson claimed to be one of a set of triplets named Shadrach, Meshach, and Abednego, after the young men in the Book of Daniel who are thrown into the fiery furnace of Babylon. However, he was baptised at St Mary's Church, Nottingham on 16 October 1811 with his twin brother Richard. Richard died and was buried at the same church on 25 October 1811. If he was one of triplets, then the third must have died at, or soon after, birth.

It has often been claimed that Thompson was the youngest of a struggling family of twenty-one children born to Benjamin Thompson, a mechanic in the lace industry, and his wife Mary, in the slums of Nottingham. However, that is a myth. William was one of six children (possibly seven) and had a younger sister, Mary, who died at the age of four. The eldest child in the family, Rebecca, born 1805, remains a mystery, because further details of her life cannot be found, and William grew up with just two surviving brothers, Thomas and John. William Thompson was strong and well developed as a young man and performed, demonstrating natural ability in various sports. His father died when he was only fifteen and, accompanied by his mother, he was sent to the Nottingham Workhouse. After leaving the Workhouse, Thompson sold oysters on the streets of Nottingham before landing a position as an iron turner, a job that enhanced his muscular build.

By the age of 18, Thompson began fighting to provide for his family. He defeated his first eight opponents, including the champion of the nearby town of Bingham. By the age of 21, he became a professional prize fighter and the details of his contests began to be recorded. Thompson was a southpaw and once, on a bet, he is said to have thrown half a house brick over the River Trent with his left hand. Although being barely 177 cm (5 ft 10 in) tall, he compensated for his lack of height with an incredible ability to punch hard and fast, and was said to be devoid of fear. He was also very agile, earning the name "Bendy" because of his constant bobbing and weaving around the ring. His nickname evolved and "Bendy", in combination with his name Abednego, became "Bendigo".

Though it was his speed and agility that won him his fights, it was Thompson's personality and sense of humour which endeared him to the crowd. He would make up rhymes about his opponents during the fights, and distract them with insults and tall tales of their wives and mothers while making funny faces at them. It wasn't long before Thompson was drawing crowds as large as 10,000 to his illicit fights, held secretly out of town in barns or fields.

=== First bout against Ben Caunt ===
Thompson's career was punctuated by his fierce rivalry with the Hucknall-born boxer Ben Caunt. On 21 July 1835, the two first met to split a purse of £25. This fight lasted 35 minutes, with 22 rounds, each round being called when either boxer's knee touched the ground. Thompson, who was 19 kg (42 lb; 3.0 st) lighter and 11 cm (4 in) shorter, got into difficulties during the fight and started to stumble frequently. That, and his continuous laughter and insults, frustrated Caunt who, in the last round, struck Thompson while he was sitting on his second's knee in his corner, costing Caunt the match on a foul. A reporter present at the bout, wrote of Caunt that he was "full of trickery and treachery — he has no ethics" and Thompson "as deadly and as poisonous as a rattlesnake with about the same ethics."

Over the next two years, Thompson fought three bouts, first dispatching the renowned John Leachman of Bradford in a 52-round contest, before moving to Newcastle the following year to defeat Charley Langham in 51 rounds.

A few months later, Thompson responded to a letter in a newspaper from Liverpudlian William Looney, challenging "... any man in the world for £200 stake and £200 a-side". The two met on 13 June 1838, on a hill known as Chapel-en-le-Frith, the halfway point between their home towns. The fight lasted for 92 rounds, but will probably be remembered for Thompson's reaction to Looney contemplating a haymaker in the fifteenth round, falling to the floor "on his nether end throwing up his legs and laughing". Thompson took control of the fight shortly after and started somersaulting in the ring, endearing him to the crowds. However, despite receiving a continuous barrage of punches, Looney fought bravely on, nearly winning the fight with a massive right hand counterpunch. Eventually Thompson's athleticism shone through and he was declared the winner after dominating over an hour of fighting.

== Fame ==
=== First title bout with Caunt, 1838 ===
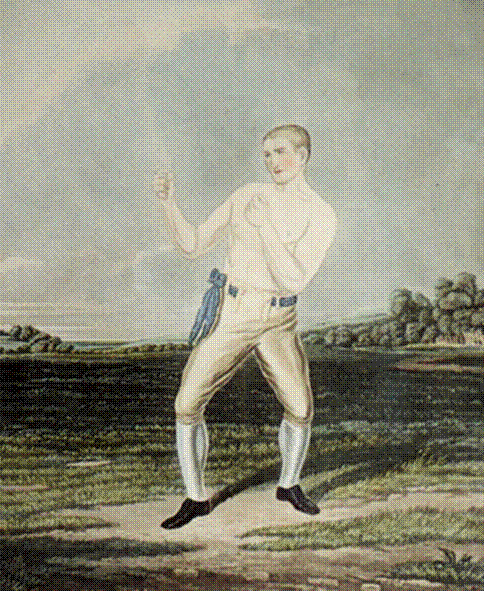
A 1846 painting showing Thompson in his "southpaw" stance

Thompson's star rose steadily. On 3 April 1838, before a crowd of 5,000, Caunt finally obtained his rematch at Skipworth Common, worth £300 in prize money. Although younger by three years, Caunt came into the ring in poorer condition than Thompson, who had trained hard prior to the match. Thompson's superior conditioning gave him greater speed and agility, and better defensive skills. The fight lasted for 75 rounds of furious combat. In the fifth round, Caunt had Thompson on the ropes and nearly strangled him but Thompson fought back, peppering his opponent with body shots and more insults. Desperate for victory and revenge, Caunt was said to have Thompson by the throat strangling him again in the thirteenth round. By the time Thompson's followers had cut the ropes and entered the ring, his face was going blue. A fight broke out between the two sets of supporters and Caunt took a few hits across the back with a ring stake.

When order was restored, Thompson was given brandy and recovered his stamina. In the fiftieth round, it was Thompson's turn for some underhand tactics, lashing out some kicks on Caunt but the referee dismissed the complaint. In the seventy-fifth round, the referee stopped the fight, because Thompson had fallen to the ground without being struck, an illegal tactic according to London Prize Ring Rules. After the fight, Thompson claimed it was a slip, a claim backed up by contemporary accounts, putting him well ahead and coasting. After the referee called the foul against Thompson, pandemonium broke out. His supporters attacked Caunt with whatever weapons were to hand. Caunt was dragged to his coach by his seconds and attempted to flee. The coach was arrested by Thompson's mob who dragged Caunt out, but he escaped during the ensuing melee, riding bareback on a stolen horse.

=== Champion of England, 1839 ===
On 8 February 1839, when Thompson was 28, he was given the task of defeating the fearsome Londoner James "Deaf" Burke for the All England Title and a purse of £220. The fight was one of the first Thompson fought under the new London Prize Ring Rules. The backers admired his wit and courage, and now a crowd favourite he was a perfect match for the title. The fight was held in a field at No Mans Heath in Leicestershire, near the village of Heather, in front of an unruly crowd of roughly 15,000 people. It lasted just ten rounds, with Thompson battering the helpless Burke, who himself had just successfully toured America. After half an hour, the frustrated Burke became so enraged with the barrage of punches and insults coming from his younger, faster and stronger challenger, he grabbed hold of Thompson and full-on head butted him twice, thus losing on a foul and gifting the championship away. The "Nottingham Jester", Champion Prize Fighter Of All England was presented his Champion's Belt a few weeks later at a ceremony in The Queens Theatre, Liverpool. When he got home to Nottingham, Thompson met his supporters on 23 March 1840, and in his excitement while somersaulting he hurt his kneecap and was laid up for two years. Thompson never stepped down from a challenge, and once he recovered from his knee injury he defeated 19 opponents over the next 4 years, including 7 in one month.

==== Defending the title against Caunt, 1845 ====
On 9 September 1845 at Lillington Level, Suffield Green, Oxford, an unruly and partly drunken crowd of 11,000 came to see the third and final fight between Thompson and Caunt who would settle the score for 200 a side. Thompson's tactics were called into question as he crouched and bobbed his way around the ring, making it harder for Caunt to hit him. Hardly a round went by without a foul being claimed in a notoriously dirty grudge match. The atmosphere was all the more intense because of the fierce rivalry between the two sets of supporters, who had come to finish what they had started six years earlier. The fight lasted a lengthy 93 rounds, with Thompson tactically and methodically breaking his man down until, exhausted after two hours ten minutes, Caunt sat down with his back turned on his "nether end" without getting hit, losing on a foul. Thompson was criticised for putting his knee to the mat to end the round after receiving only a light blow, or possibly no blow, but the referee did not call him for a foul. Thompson would be declared the winner on a foul despite Caunt's advantage in height, weight, and youth. The fight was described by a contemporary writer as "one of the most scandalous brawls in boxing history. Both men used every foul under the sun and invented a good many others ... Thompson was tossed from the ring ... Caunt trying to crash him on the ring stakes to break his back. Thompson's [followers] attempted to bludgeon Caunt whenever within striking distance ... on one occasion missing by a hairs breadth, the blow landing on Caunt's brawny shoulder ..." Bells Life wrote that Thompson's methods were opposed to the principles of a fair, stand-up fight, and were the actions of a coward.

Years later, when speaking on the fight, Lord Longford, a former backer, reacted to Thompson's evangelising with the comment: "I hope you fight Beelzebub with more fairness than you fought Caunt or else I might change sides."

This fight seemed to have taken a lot out of Thompson, who went back to his childhood pastime of fishing. He became very friendly with a well-known angler called William Bailey, who made and sold fishing tackle from his shop in Broadmarsh. Thompson won several All England fishing awards.

==== Last title bout with Tom Paddock, 1850 ====
Bust of Thompson from Puglistica, 1838

Although enjoying his quiet life, Thompson accepted a challenge from young Tom Paddock from Redditch and, on 5 June 1850, the 39-year-old William Abednego Thompson began his last fight. In two minds as to whether to accept the challenge or not, his 82-year-old mother encouraged him by saying "And I tell you this Bendy, if you don't take up the challenge you are a coward. And I tell you more, if you won't fight him I'll send and take up his challenge myself."

The fight was a close one and lasted over an hour. In the seventh, Paddock was suspected of kicking Thompson but no foul was called. Paddock, the younger man by far, was getting the better of Thompson, who started to go to ground very easily causing the end of several rounds. That infuriated Paddock who, after flooring Thompson with a right hand in the 49th, thought Thompson had gone down again. Paddock charged across the ring, and pulled him to his feet shouting, "Get up and fight like a man". In what became the last round, Paddock hit Thompson while he was down and lying across the ropes. Thompson's corner man called foul and the referee concurred, giving Thompson the decision.

== Retirement and decline ==
Feeling he was getting too old for prize fighting, Thompson, "The Nottingham Jester", stepped down undefeated as champion, with two prize belts and four silver cups to his name. His outspoken character and record in the ring attracted a massive fan base, including Sir Arthur Conan Doyle, who wrote a verse to the fighter, titled "Bendigo's Sermon";

You didn't know of Bendigo?
Well that knocks me out!
Who's your board schoolteacher?
What's he been about?
Chock a block with fairy tales;
Full of useless cram,
And never heard of Bendigo
The Pride Of Nottingham

Speaking about his own career, Thompson said proudly: "I was engaged in 21 matched fights and never was beaten in one. What is more, I never in my life had a hit on the nose hard enough to make it bleed; and in all my battles I never once got a black eye." After declaring his retirement, he took up an unofficial role as boxing coach at Oxford University, teaching the art of pugilism. Because it was an unofficial role, the staff described him as a professor, to avoid suspicion and hide his lower-class origins. That job was a step up from his impoverished life in the Nottingham work house.

His association with the upper classes wasn't entirely to his liking, and he soon made his way back to Nottingham. Not long after his return, his mother died. Thompson saw that as failure to honour his promise to keep her out of poverty and the workhouse, so in his grief he returned to alcohol. Now however, he was a national celebrity and comparatively wealthy. He became involved with the Nottingham Lambs, a politically motivated group which was active in Nottingham, causing much civil unrest and violence. On some occasions they rioted through the Market Square, protesting against the conditions in which people were forced to live, and burning down Nottingham Castle.

After a few years, the fallen champ became a sorry drunken mess, not even a shadow of his former self. Gangs of children would taunt him when they saw him out in the streets. When sending him for one of his 28 visits to the house of correction for being drunk and disorderly, sometimes taking half a dozen constables to restrain him, a magistrate observed: "Thompson, when sober was one of the nicest men in Nottingham, but when yer drunk, you ain't!" After one of his "holidays" inside, Thompson started to take an interest in the prison chaplain's sermons, especially the story of David and Goliath, declaring, "I do hope the lit'lun licks the big'un."

== Later life ==
On 6 June 1850, immediately after his fight with Tom Paddock, he was arrested for drunkenness on Chandler Street in Nottingham and released after paying a 5 shilling fee. He eventually moved to Beeston to try to curb his drinking with his friends in Nottingham, but could not stop his habit for long, having only a few sober moments fishing by the Trent. Once, at the age of 59, he dived into the river to save three people who appeared to be drowning. When a woman he had rescued offered him a reward, he rejected her offer with scorn, reminding her that he was the champion of England.

In 1872, Thompson attended a congregation led by preacher Richard Weaver. Though Thompson was illiterate, he delivered a strong and convincing sermon. When preaching at the Ebenezer Lodge of Good Templars, he would take up a boxer's stance, turn to his trophies and say, "See them belts? See them cups? I used to fight for those, but now I fight for Christ." During one sermon, he became perturbed by hecklers at the back of the room and shouted in frustration "Good Lord, Thou knowest that since I gave up my wicked ways I have devoted my life to Thy service, and have given Thee the whole of my time."

His popularity as a fighter soon brought enormous crowds to his sermons with scores left outside. Thompson spent the next few years touring the country preaching to crowds of thousands, becoming more popular, and eventually he gained attention of politicians. Some in the public sector noted, "that although he couldn't read the bible, his straightforward manly speech could be useful".

Thompson died on 23 August 1880, aged 68, after falling down the stairs of his home in Beeston. Though suffering from a fractured rib and punctured lung, he clung to life for seven weeks. His funeral procession was exceedingly long and was watched by thousands lining the roads, including a number of the wealthy and famed. Impressively, The Times of London published an obituary, usually an honour bestowed only on the most famous Britons. He was buried on 27 August 1880 in St Mary's burial ground, Sneinton, Nottingham, and not, as has been claimed, in his mother's grave. She died in 1854 and is buried almost 1 mile (1.6 km) away in the General Cemetery. Thompson's tomb, which features a crouching lion, can be seen at the burial ground in Bath Street Rest Gardens, near Victoria Leisure Centre in Nottingham. It bears the inscription;

"In life always brave,
Fighting like a Lion;
In Death like a Lamb,
Tranquil in Zion".

== Selected fights ==
5 Wins, 1 Loss
Result	Opponent(s)	Date	Location	Duration	Notes
Win	Joe Hanley	Oct 1832	England	16 rounds	
Win	Ben Caunt	21 June 1835	Nottingham England	22 Rounds	Won on a foul, Caunt struck Thompson when he was down
Win	Bill Looney	13 June 1837	Chapel-en-le-Firth, England	99 Rounds	
Loss	Ben Caunt	3 April 1838	Shelby, England	75 rounds	Lost on foul
Win	James Burke	12 February 1839	Heather, England	10 rounds	Won Championship of England, on foul
Win	Ben Caunt	9 September 1845	Stoney Stratford, England	75 rounds	Defended English Championship, won on foul
Win	Ben Caunt	5 June 1850	Mildenhall, England	75 rounds	Retained English Champion, won on foul, then retired

== Legacy ==
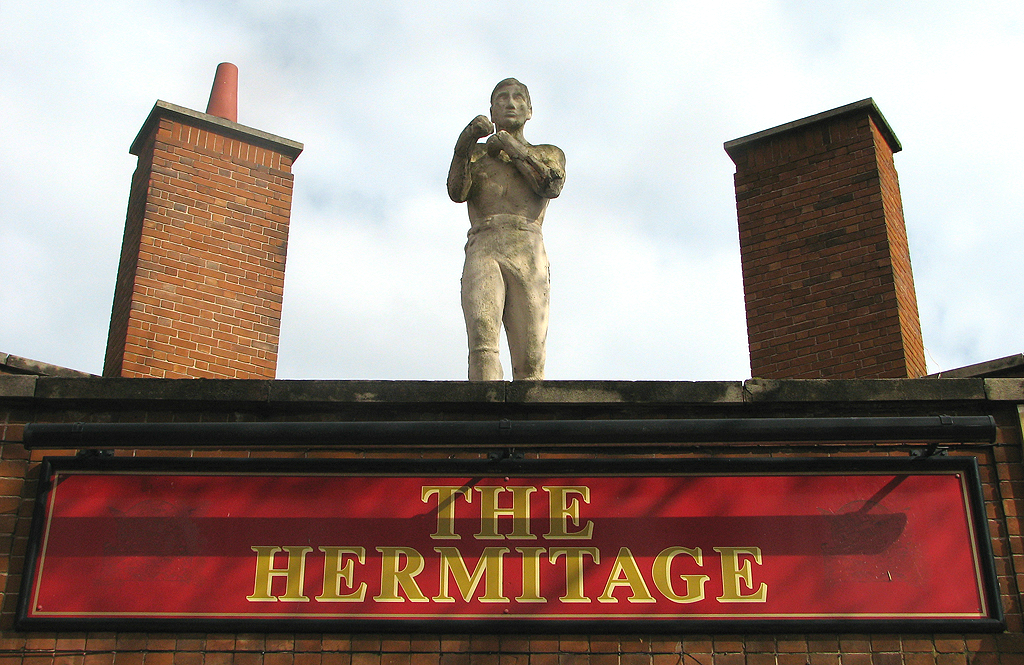
Statue of Thompson in Sneinton

A public house in Sneinton, Nottingham was named after its famous resident. The Old Wrestlers pub was converted to Bendigo's in 1957 and became popular among Sneinton locals. Ironically the pub was forced to close in the late 1990s due to brawling but re-opened as The Hermitage in 1999 and remained in operation for another decade before closing again in 2009. As of 2013, the building has been renovated and is used for private events, although the statue of Thompson above the entrance still remains and locals commonly refer to the site as Bendigo`s or The Bendigo to this day.

The area of Sneinton just north east of the pub falls within the Nottinghamshire Police beat called Bendigo. This covers the area from Kentwood Rd north east to Highcliffe Rd and part of Colwick Wood, including the north part of Racecourse Rd (opposite the entrance to Nottingham racecourse). Just off this road is a small new-build housing area, the main road being Bendigo Lane.

One of the trams operated by Nottingham Express Transit carries the name of Bendigo Thompson.

The city of Bendigo in Victoria, Australia is indirectly named after Thompson. An early Australian shepherd on the Ravenswood Run was also a bare-knuckle boxer with a style reminiscent of Thompson, and hence was given the same nickname, which was then applied to the area as Bendigo's Creek. The town that grew up around the area in the 19th century was named as Sandhurst but reverted to Bendigo in 1891.

In Bestwood, a suburban part of Nottingham, there is a small nature reserve on Sunrise Hill that was a copse known locally as "Bendigo's Ring". The name is now mistakenly associated with nearby Glade Hill which still carries a highly visible copse.

A character named Gonolph Bendigo, clearly meant to be analogous to William Thompson, appeared in the second series of Defoe, a comic anthologised in 2000AD. Although Defoe is set in the seventeenth, rather than nineteenth, century, the character owes a lot to the real-life boxer, being a retired bare-knuckle fighter of note whose nickname was also "Bendy" and who famously defeated a Ben Caunt.

A Nottingham-based group called the 'Bendigo Memorial Fund' are raising money to have a statue of Bendigo in Nottingham city centre.

=== Southpaw stance ===
Thompson is often credited with introducing the southpaw stance.
