= Joe Coburn =

American boxer

Personal information
- Nationality: Irish American (United States); Came to America around 1850; Settled in Queens, NY.
- Born: Joseph Henry Coburn; 29 July 1835 Middletown County, Armagh, Ireland
- Died: 6 December 1890 (aged 55) Queens, New York
- Height: 5 ft 9.25 in (1.76 m); Varies downward slightly in records
- Weight: 185 lb (84 kg)*, heavyweight division *Early career fought as middleweight weight range, 154-190

Boxing career
- Stance: Orthodox; Right handed Used London Prize Ring Rules

Boxing record
- Total fights: 10 * major professional bouts only
- Wins: 4
- Losses: 2
- Draws: 3
- No contests: 1

Joe Coburn (July 29, 1835, in Middletown, County Armagh, Ireland – December 6, 1890, in New York City, New York) was an Irish-American boxer. In 1862 he claimed the Heavyweight Championship from John Carmel Heenan when Heenan refused to fight him.

== Early life and career, 1835–38 ==
Coburn was born on July 29, 1835, in Middletown, County Armagh, Ireland to Irish native parents Michael and Mary Trainor. Coburn's family emigrated to America during the Great Irish famine in 1850, when he was around fifteen years of age. His father Michael was a master of manual trade, and Joe grew up to be a bricklayer in New York's Sixteenth Ward. By the age of 21, he was active in the 16th's Volunteer Fire Department, and one of his earliest Brooklyn fights, which he won in four rounds, was arranged by his co-workers. In time, Coburn acquired and operated his own tavern, known as "The White House" in lower Manhattan. As a young boxer, as well as in his prime, Coburn was known for quickness, but not great physical strength.

Around 1856, after Coburn traveled to Boston to meet Ned Price, an English criminal lawyer, the pair met at Spot Pond. After 100 rounds and three and a half hours of desperate combat, no winner was determined as the referee had called a draw due to darkness. The brutal match took both men months to recover. They began their recovery with two weeks confined to their rooms, barely able to rise from bed. Coburn then defeated Patsy Flynn on August 7, 1857, in New York, in an indoor room, in four rounds."Mystery surrounds granite marker on island in the middle of Stoneham pond." *The Boston Globe*, 20 June 2016, https://www.bostonglobe.com/metro/2016/06/20/mystery-surrounds-granite-marker-island-middle-stoneham-pond/MnNVBjq3ubY6d0RyVjCP4I/story.html.

Coburn defeated Harry Gribbin, for a $1,000 a side, in twenty-one rounds on November 19, 1857, in Bertie County Canada, and then defeated Western boxer Ben Winkles for another $1,000 stake in only eighteen minutes. The following month, Coburn completed an exhibition with John C. Heenan in New York.

== London Prize Ring rules ==
Under the English Broughton rules, if a boxer went down and could not continue after 30 seconds, the fight ended. Hitting a downed fighter and grasping or hitting below the waist were prohibited. Broughton invented and encouraged the use of "mufflers", a form of padded gloves, which were used in training and exhibitions, but rarely in prize fights. The advent of the Broughton rules around 1743 did allow fighters an advantage not enjoyed by modern boxers; a boxer could drop to one knee to start a 30-second count at any point in the match, but overuse of this privilege was frowned upon and sometimes disallowed by the judges.

By 1866, when Coburn began boxing in earnest, the Broughton Rules had evolved into the slightly more civilized London Prize Ring Rules promulgated in 1843. Fine scientific boxing with a calculated defense involving feints with the arms and forward foot were rarely a feature of bare-knuckle boxing in the 1860s, nor necessary with the undisciplined nature of London Prize Ring Rules. The rules did not permit head butting, holding the ropes, strangling, using resin, or stones or hard objects in the hands, and biting. Other than gouging, hitting a man when he was down, kicking, or hitting or grabbing below the waist, most moves were permitted, including throwing a man down or holding him to inflict blows.

== American heavyweight champion, 1862–63 ==
Heavyweight challenger Mike McCoole

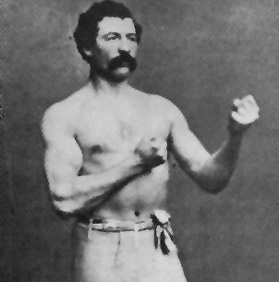
Heavyweight John C. Heenan, circa 1863

Coburn first claimed the heavyweight championship in 1862 when John C. Heenan, the "Benicia Boy", failed to meet him in a fight. Heenan had first attempted the championship unsuccessfully in 1858 against John Morrissey, and had also unsuccessfully attempted the championship of England against Tom King in Wadhurst, England on December 10, 1863. Coburn would only have two American heavyweight championship fights in his career that were not cancelled or ended by police. In the first, on May 5, 1863, using London Prize Ring Rules and bare knuckles, Coburn defended the American title against Mike McCoole, winning a lengthy one hour and eight minute battle requiring 67 rounds in Charlestown, Maryland. The stakes ended at $2500 a side. Coburn had recently completed a prison term for a violent offense. McCoole had as much as a 20 pound weight advantage, but Coburn was the favorite in the early betting. Coburn appeared to have the edge from the start. He was thrown heavily to the ground several times, but in nearly every round "delivered his blows fairly and with tremendous effect against the face of his antagonist without his ever having received a blow in his face". In the 63rd round of the brutal affair, Coburn appeared visibly exhausted. By the 67th, McCoole, who appeared "lifeless", was taken away in a wagon. He had had his bruises and cuts first attended to by ringside attendants. The fight was illegal in Maryland, and authorities noted that an attempt to make arrests at the fight itself would have caused violence against the inhabitants of Charlestown. Nonetheless, when they tried to meet the following year near Indianapolis, they were both arrested and served forty days in Jail.

In late 1865, Coburn challenged Tom King, the reigning English heavyweight, considered by most to be a world champion, but King said he was retiring from pugilism and declined. King would precede Coburn as the world heavyweight champion.

Around 1865, According to the Irish Post, Coburn defeated world and American champions Joe Goss and Tom Allen, as well as Bill Rayel in Great Britain, in a build up for a future fight with American Jem Mace. He fought at around 190 pounds during his British tour, certainly a heavyweight, and a good bit heavier than he fought in his earlier boxing career.

=== Loss of championship, 1865 ===
In 1865, Coburn refused an offer to fight Jimmy Elliott for the Heavyweight championship of America, and instead chose to retire. His championship title was officially vacated the following year, but he soon chose to return to the ring.

== Last Championship attempt, 1871 ==
Coburn came out of retirement in 1871 against Jem Mace to again fight for the heavyweight championship. Many boxing historians now consider the fight was for the world, not just the American championship. The first scheduled title fight between the two, in 1864, did not go ahead as Mace failed to show. Coburn was furious that Mace had prevented him from participating in the lucrative match, which would have drawn a large crowd. In the second fight on November 30, 1871, in Bay St. Louis, Louisiana, Mace injured his hand in the fifth. The fighters agreed to call it a draw after the 12th round, due to Mace's infirmity, though the torrential ran was likely the real cause of the abbreviated match that had required the boxers to fight up to their knees in mud.

=== Arrest for assault, 1877 ===
Coburn was no stranger to struggles with the law, as many of his prize fights were illegal in the states he fought them. On March 6, 1877, he received ten years in prison for assault with intent to kill policeman William Tobias the previous month in New York City. Sentenced to Auburn Prison, he was released on December 7, 1882, after serving six years of his sentence. Many of his fights were stopped by police prior to completion or were moved to escape arrest.

== Sullivan exhibitions, 1882 ==
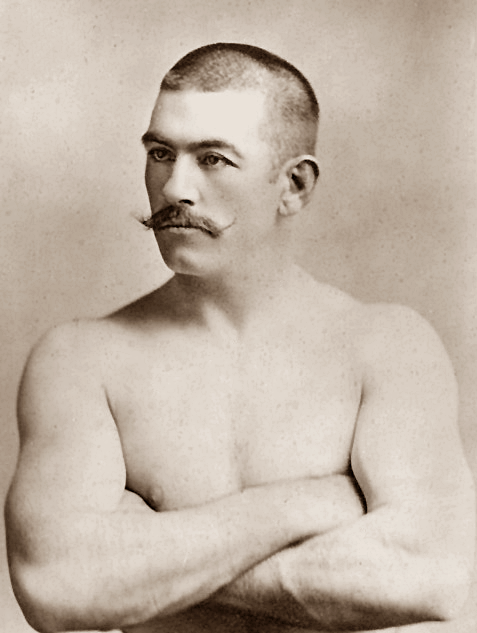
Champion John L. Sullivan

After his release from jail, Coburn fought seven successful exhibition bouts with the highly popular champion John L. Sullivan from December 1882 through March 1883, as well as three with Herbert Slade in April. Coburn's exhibition with Sullivan on January 20, 1883, was a lucrative arrangement which played to a full house at Buffalo's St. James Hall, and featured other pugilists as well. The two drew large crowds again on January 30, 1883, when they performed at Coburn's hometown of Troy, New York. Sullivan, once against did most of the heavy slugging. With boxing growing in acceptance, partly due to the popularity of Sullivan, the authorities made no efforts to stop the two pugilists during the exhibition. The pair put on a thoroughly scientific display without much heavy slugging on March 13, 1883, before a crowd of 4,000 at New York's prestigious Madison Square Garden. During the three rounds, Coburn fought on the evening of March 19 in Boston, Sullivan took the lead throughout, landing a few solid blows on Coburn, who was on the defensive throughout the bout. In the successful exhibition which raised over $10,000, Coburn was greeted with a warm cheer by the exceptional crowd of 15,000 as he took the stage, while another 4,000 waited outside unable to gain admittance. During their exhibition on April 19, 1883, Coburn appeared somewhat more gifted than the taller Australian Slade at the Griswold Opera House in Coburn's hometown of Troy, New York. It was the opinion of many that Herbert Slade was the better boxer in his exhibition with Coburn on April 23, 1883, in New York. Slade handled his fists well, but it was not sufficient to stop Coburn's blows. On the other hand, Slade's speed allowed him to get in a number of good whacks on Coburn. Coburn appeared to reel as if he might go down on a few occasions from Slade's blows, but some of the exhibition may have been slightly staged, as it seems unlikely Coburn was in any real danger. His time in prison had certainly effected his speed and strength somewhat. Slade looked best with his left, but was less well suited on his defense, though overall few present felt he was ready for the best in his division.

On May 17, 1885, Coburn was arrested on the complaint of Charles Carter that he had robbed him of $950 at Coburn's Saloon on Broadway. The charges were later dropped when Carter refused to formally file the complaint at the Police station-house and Coburn was immediately released.

Coburn lost to "Professor" William Clark on December 14, 1888, in St. Louis in three rounds. The combatants scored twenty minutes with blackened gloves and Clark won the bout 4 points to 2 for Coburn. Clark was 62 and Coburn already around 54.

Coburn in late life

In 2013, Coburn was elected to the International Boxing Hall of Fame.

In boxing retirement, Coburn continued to manage his Saloon on Broadway. He had problems with alcohol throughout his life which contributed to his frequent bar fights and crimes.

=== Death, 1890 ===
Coburn died on the evening of December 6, 1890, of consumption at his home in New York City, leaving a wife and two-year-old son. Consumption usually referred to tuberculosis in 1890, though Coburn's illness may have been pneumonia, according to one source. He was penniless due to his conspicuous spending habits. A number of his friends had raised $1,000 in a benefit for him at Lexon Hall a few days before his death. After an afternoon service at his home, he was buried in Calvary Cemetery, Queens, New York.

== See also ==
- List of world heavyweight boxing champions

Achievements
Preceded by Thomas King– Vacated	Heavyweight bare-knuckle boxing champion Claimed in 1862–Vacated in 1865	Succeeded by Mike McCoole
