= Tom Sayers =

English boxer (1826–1865)

- Tom Sayers, early hand-tinted photograph, circa 1860
- Born: 25 May 1826; Brighton, England
- Died: 8 November 1865 (aged 39); Camden Town, London, England
- Nationality: British
- Height: 5 ft 8 in (173 cm)
- Weight: 150 lb (68 kg; 10 st 10 lb)
- Years active: 1849–1860

Professional boxing record
- Total: 16
- Wins: 12
- Losses: 1
- Draws: 3

Thomas Sayers (15 or 25 May 1826 – 8 November 1865) was an English bare-knuckle prize fighter. There were no formal weight divisions at the time, and although Sayers was only five feet eight inches tall and never weighed much more than 150lbs (10.7 stones), he frequently fought much bigger men. In a career which lasted from 1849 until 1860, he lost only one of sixteen bouts. He was recognized as heavyweight champion of England between 1857, when he defeated William Perry (the "Tipton Slasher"), and his retirement in 1860.

His first fame depended exclusively on his final contest, when he faced American champion John Camel Heenan in a battle widely considered to be boxing's first world championship. It ended in chaos when the spectators invaded the ring, and the referee finally declared a draw.

Regarded as a national hero, Sayers, for whom the considerable sum of £3,000 was raised by public subscription, then retired from the ring. After his death five years later at the age of 39, a huge crowd watched his cortège on its journey to London's Highgate Cemetery.

== Early years ==
Sayers was born in May 1826, in a slum in the Brighton alley of Pimlico (now Tichborne Street) not far from the Royal Pavilion. He was the youngest of the five children of William Sayers (33), a shoemaker, and his wife Maria, ten years her husband's senior. At the age of six, Sayers became a Jack-in-the-water, earning a few coppers performing small duties for holidaymakers and fishermen on Brighton beach. Claims that he attended school in 1836 may be unfounded, and he was barely literate.

At the age of thirteen, he walked to London, where he stayed with his sister Eliza and her husband, Robert King, a builder. Sayers became a bricklayer and for the next seven years shuttled between his home town and the capital. He is known to have worked on the London Road viaduct outside Brighton and may well have taken part in the construction of London's King's Cross Station.

In an anecdote of his early life, it was reported that whilst working on the construction of Wandsworth Prison he was struck by his supervisor, described as a "great big bully of a fellow", and on his returning the blow it was decided to carry on the fight at a nearby common. Here, after a tremendous battle, Sayers prevailed, knocking out his adversary.

In 1846 he finally settled in the capital, taking up residence in the notorious slum of Agar Town, just north of where St Pancras Station now stands. It was around 1847 that he set up home in a more salubrious part of Camden Town with Sarah Henderson. Only fifteen years old, Sarah was unable to marry without her father's permission and her daughter, Sarah (1850–1891), and son, Tom (1852–1936), by Sayers were consequently illegitimate.

== Prize ring career ==
=== Early career ===
Although the prize ring had long been illegal, it continued as an underground activity, and Sayers, having earned a considerable reputation from a number of informal fights, decided to try to make a living with his fists. His first contest as a professional was on 19 March 1849 near Greenhithe when he defeated Abe Couch (or Crouch). His next contest was with Dan Collins on 22 October 1850 at Edenbridge, Kent. The fight was interrupted after 9 rounds by the local constabulary. The fight recommenced at Red Hill but was abandoned in a draw as darkness descended. The two fighters met again on 29 April 1851 at Long Reach, the result being victory to Sayers.

Sayers next took on Jack Grant for £100 a side, the fight taking place at Mildenhall, Suffolk on 29 June 1852. For this fight, Grant had Harry Orme in his corner whilst Sayers was attended by Nat Adams and Bob Fuller. The fight lasted 64 rounds, Sayers ending up as victor.

Tom Sayers next fight was with Jack Martin, who was backed by Ben Caunt, and the fight took place on 26 January 1853 with Sayers winning after 23 rounds.

=== Loss to Nat Langham ===
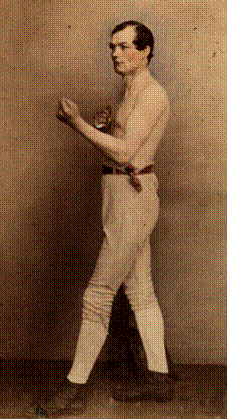
Nat Langham, the only boxer to defeat Sayers

In 1853, Sayers challenged Nat Langham, who, despite the absence of formal weight divisions, was widely accepted as England's middleweight champion. The fight took place on 18 October 1853 at Lakenheath, Suffolk. This was Sayers's toughest fight so far, and a combination of illness and inexperience contributed to his first and only defeat. The wily Langham gained the upper hand by temporarily blinding his opponent with frequent blows to the eyes. The end came in the 61st round with Sayers unable to see his opponent, who could therefore strike him at will. Sayers was still reluctant to quit, however, and one of his seconds, Alec Keene was forced to "throw up the sponge" to signify the end of the contest. Once his eyes were healed, Sayers requested a re-match but Langham announced his retirement from the prize-ring.

Still, Sayers had fought well, and defeat did not damage his career. But his marriage that same year to Sarah Henderson, by now old enough to marry without her father's permission, was soon in ruins as she left to live with another man. To make matters worse, on top of an expensive failure to set himself up as a publican, he had great difficulty arranging another payday in the ring. He had one further victory against a fighter near his own weight before taking on much heavier men. The fighter was George Sims, described by the boxing chronicle Pugilistica as " a civil, well-behaved, courageous fellow, ridiculously over-estimated by his friends". The one-sided contest took place at Longreach on 2 February 1854, Sayers knocking his opponent out after 4 rounds of fighting, taking just 5 minutes.

=== Challenges heavyweight fighters ===
Tom Sayers, champion of England 1857–60

In convincing Sayers to challenge the heavyweights, Gideon was breaking convention. The convention – though it was never a formal rule – was that men fought others of their own size, and few gave him much chance against the highly regarded Harry Paulson. Paulson was shorter than Sayers by an inch but was described as "a perfect Hercules in the torso, weighing 12st. 7lb. in hard condition." Sayers, however, was undaunted, and in January 1856, a convincing victory raised him to a new level.

Sayers' next two fights were with Aaron Jones in the early months of 1857. The first contest ended in a draw after 62 rounds of fighting but Sayers won the subsequent bout on 10 February 1857. According to the boxing chronicler, Fred Henning: "this battle brought the plucky Brighton Boy still nearer to the coveted title, and it was evident that giving away weight made very little matter to him and he proved by his conquering of the two heavy weights that he must have some chance for the Championship, so his friends were determined that he should have a try when the opportunity offered itself".

=== Fight for the championship ===
At this time, there was no undisputed champion of England amongst the heavier fighters. Harry Broome, who had won the title in 1851 against William Perry (known as the "Tipton Slasher") and defended it against Harry Orme in 1853, had forfeited an arranged re-match with William Perry and had written to the editor of the sporting paper Bell's Life in London in August 1853, when he "intimated his intention of retiring from the Prize Ring".

In early 1855, fight supporters commissioned a new championship belt, the previous one "having gone astray". The subscription raised £100 and a Bond Street jeweller was asked to make the new belt. At this date there were thought to be 5 possible contenders for the Championship: William Perry, Harry Broome, Harry Orme, Tom Paddock and Aaron Jones.

William Perry claimed the title for himself and attempted to set up fights with Aaron Jones and Tom Paddock in 1856, however both forfeited to him rather than fight, which gave the opportunity for Sayers to fight for the championship.

On 3 March 1857, the articles for a fight between Sayers and the Tipton Slasher were signed. The fight was to be for £100 per side plus the new Championship belt. According to one of the chroniclers of the Prize Ring, many thought it was "a wild, mad, revolutionary idea to match a 10st. 10lb. man of 5ft. 8in. against a 14 stoner of over 6ft., and the latter, mind you, no duffer, but the Champion of England, who had won his title by hard fighting". Perry was so confident of winning that he sold his pub in Spon Lane, West Bromwich, and staked the proceeds on himself at 6 to 4 on odds. However, although confident of winning, he did not underestimate Sayers and he trained hard for the fight. This fight, Perry's final one, took place on 16 June 1857 on the Isle of Grain. During the fight, Sayers demonstrated his ring craft as he moved swiftly, dodging the Slasher's heaviest punches. According to one eye-witness report, Perry's tactics were at fault as, despite being slower on his feet, he tried to force the pace of the fight, instead of fighting defensively and using his powers as a counter-hitter. In the end, Sayers won a convincing victory after 10 rounds of fighting, lasting 1 hour and 42 minutes.

=== Championship defences ===
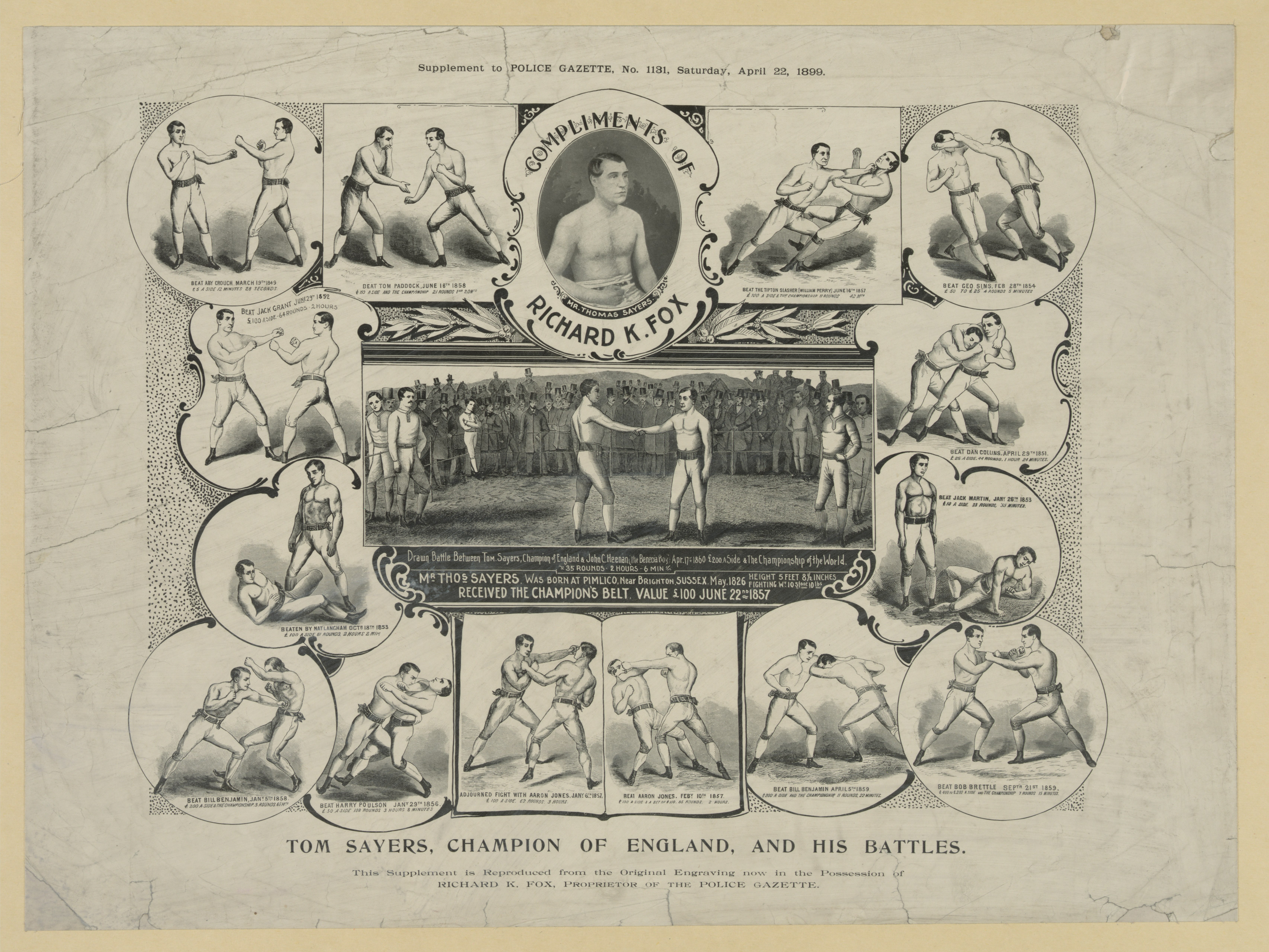
Tom Sayers, champion of England, and his battles (from the Police Gazette)

Sayers first fight as champion was with Bill Benjamin on the Isle of Grain on 5 January 1858. According to the sporting paper, Bell's Life in London, Benjamin's real name was William Bainge, and he was a complete novice at prizefighting. Sayers won easily after 3 rounds of fighting, which took just 6 1/2 minutes.

On 16 June 1858, Sayers took on and beat the experienced fighter Tom Paddock on Canvey Island. In the 21st round, Sayers, noting that exhausted Paddock could hardly see and was incapable of defending himself, shook his opponent by the hand and led him back to his corner, prompting Paddock's seconds to "throw up the sponge".

On 5 April 1859, Sayers fought a rematch with a much improved Bill Benjamin. Sayers came out on top, defeating his opponent in 11 rounds.

On 20 September 1859 a fight took place with the Birmingham-based Bob Brettle, The contest differed from Sayers' recent fights in that Brettle was slightly the lighter man. In the 7th round, Brettle dislocated his shoulder and so was unable to continue, giving victory and the £600 stake money to Sayers.

In 1859 Sayers accepted a challenge from US champion John Camel Heenan known as the Benicia Boy.

=== The fight with John C. Heenan ===
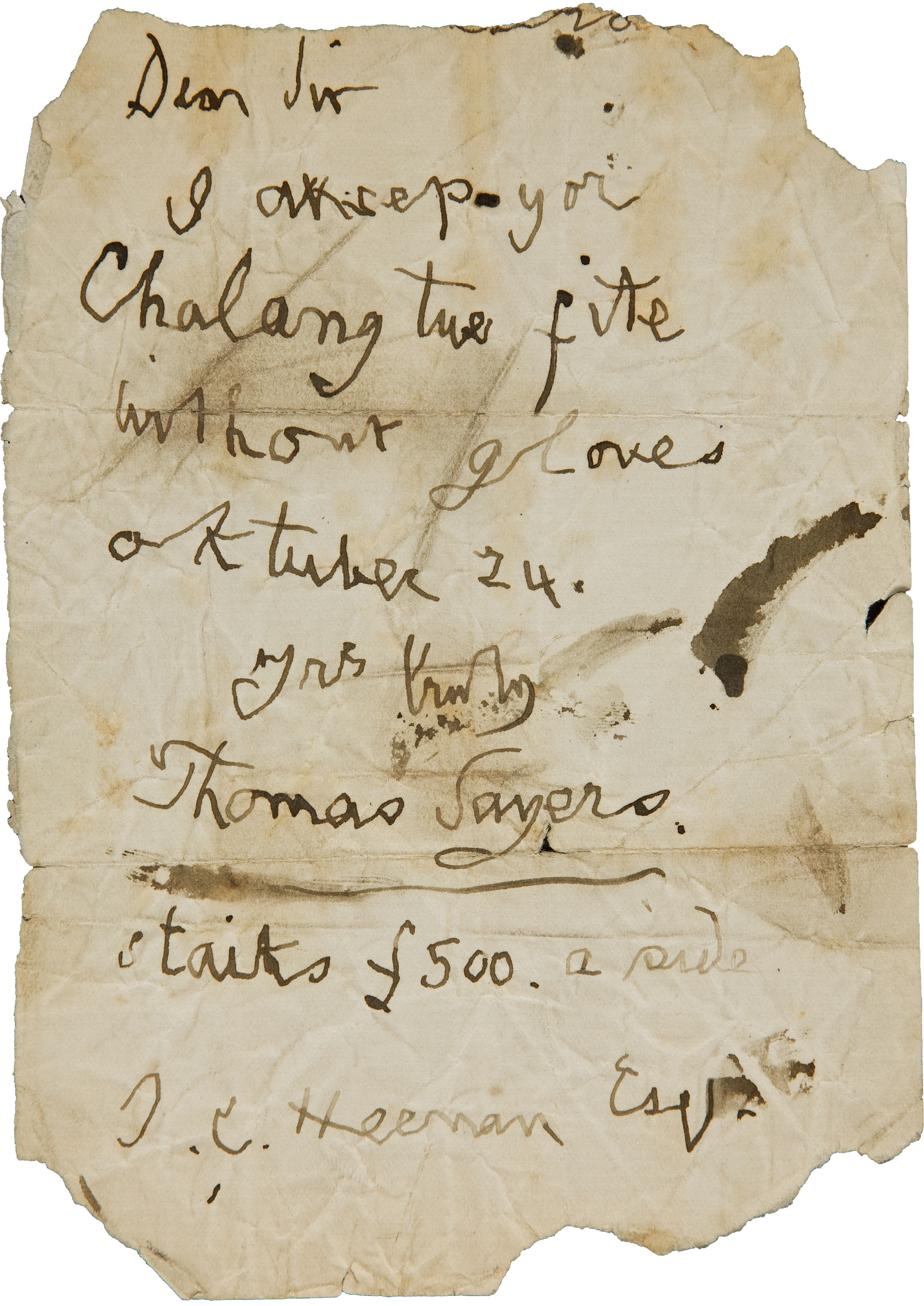
Sayers's 1859 letter accepting Heenan's challenge

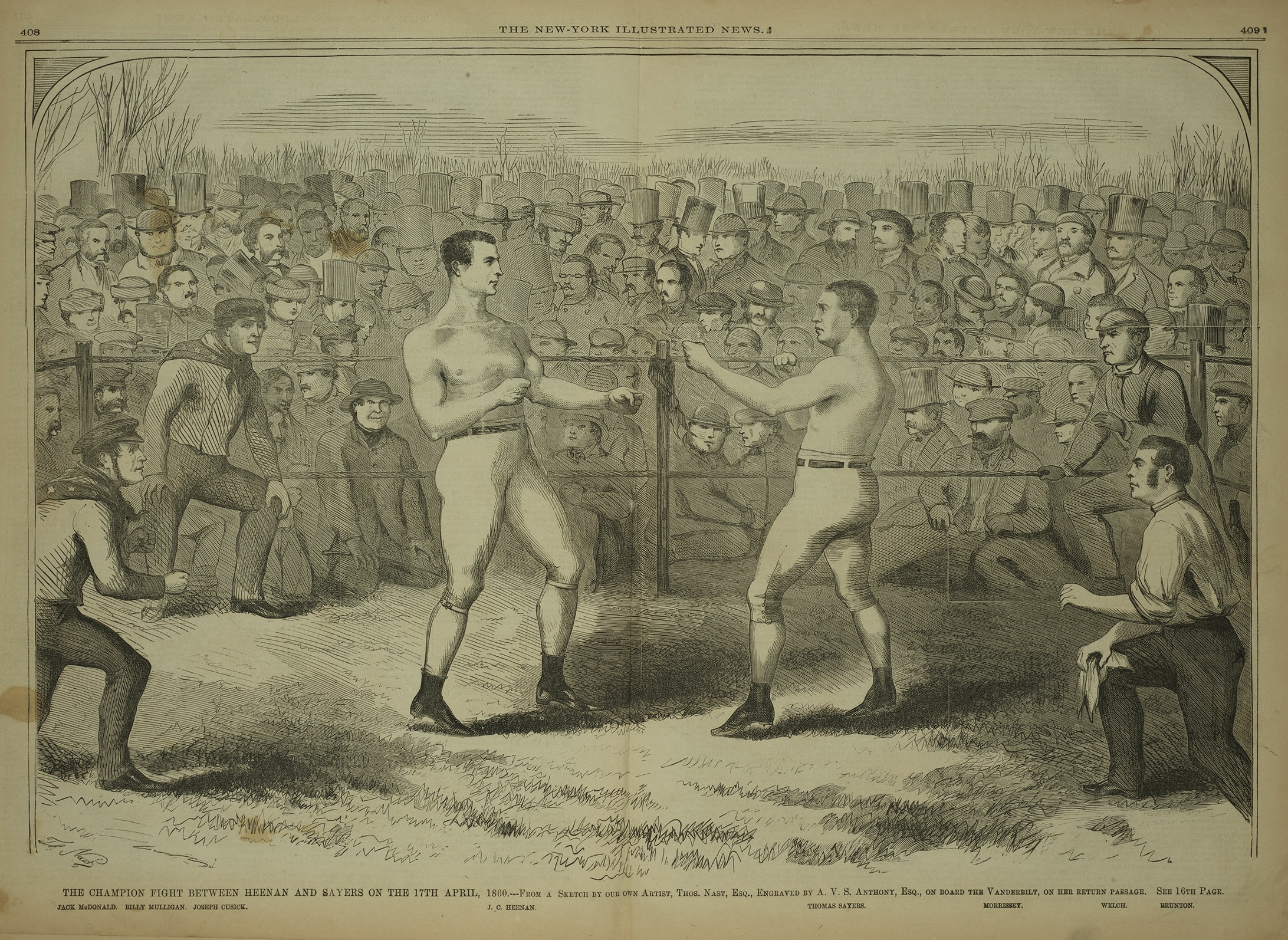
The Champion Fight between Heenan and Sayers on the 17th April, 1860. From a sketch on the spot by Thomas Nast, engraved by A.V.S. Anthony, on board the Vanderbilt, on her return passage, for the New York Illustrated News

By this time the prize ring was in utter disrepute – and virtually ignored by everyone outside the ranks of the Fancy, as the followers of boxing were known – yet the Sayers–Heenan fight caught the public imagination on both sides of the Atlantic. In the words of The Times, "this challenge has led to an amount of attention being bestowed on the prize ring which it has never received before", while in America, the New York Clipper observed that "'Whate'er we do, where'er we be,' fight, fight, fight is the topic that engrosses all attention".

Efforts of a number of concerned citizens to have the illegal event prevented came to nothing, and the battle took place at Farnborough in Hampshire on the morning of Tuesday, 17 April 1860. From contemporary reports it appears that the fight took place in a field just east of Farnborough North railway station. Transport from London to the venue was provided by South Western Railways. According to one eyewitness: "Several members of Parliament were present, and among the "nobility and gentry," besides the noble owner of the property, we were shown the Duke of Sutherland, the Marquis of Stafford, and Colonel Peel. There were about two thousand persons, and in the crowd were very many of the London celebrities in the literary, artistic, and sporting world."

Sayers' seconds for the fight were Harry Brunton and Jemmy Walsh, whilst Heenan was attended by Jack MacDonald and Jim Cusick.

It was on the face of it an unequal contest: Sayers was conceding forty pounds in weight, five inches in height and eight years in age. Heenan won the toss for corners and placed himself at an advantage with his back to the sun. At about half-past seven in the morning, the contest started.

According to one report, Heenan had the better of the opening rounds, knocking down Sayers in the 3rd and 4th rounds. To make matters worse for Sayers, his right arm was damaged in the 6th round, warding off a blow from Heenan, and he had to fight one-handed for most of a ferocious contest which went on for more than two hours. However, in the next round, which one reporter called "a fine specimen of stratagem and skill", Sayers struck several blows around and on Heenan's right eye, which had the effect of closing it for the remainder of the fight.

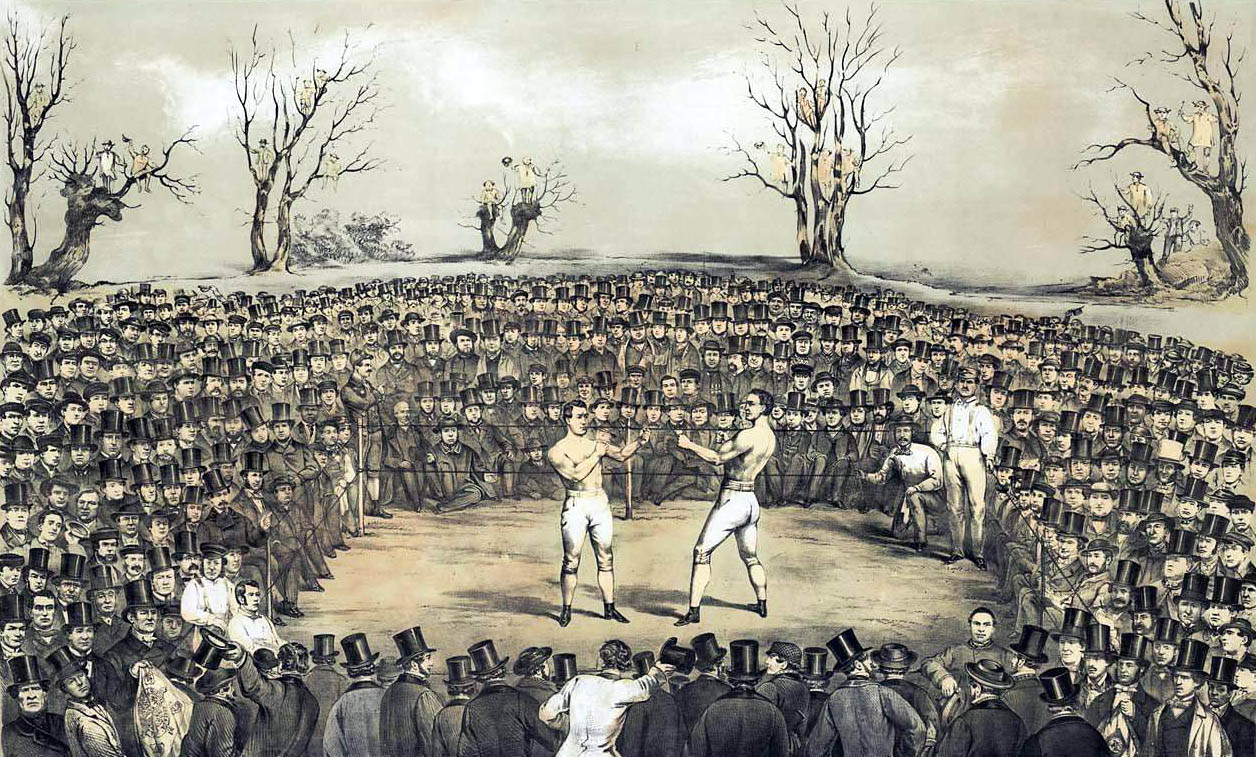
Retired boxer Jem Ward painted this picture of the Sayers–Heenan fight.

In the 37th round, the fight descended into chaos when Heenan held Sayers around the neck on the ropes. The ropes were let down and the crowd invaded the ring, and it also became clear that the police were in the vicinity, keen to put a stop to proceedings. The referee, having been "forced from his post" tried to bring the contest to an end but the ring was reformed and five more rounds fought before the referee could finally end the contest. The fight was finally declared a draw, but hostilities continued for some weeks outside the ring, with the American camp claiming that Heenan had been cheated of victory, and the British insisting that Sayers had been on top.

According to Iain Manson, a careful study of newspaper reports of the fight and the subsequent controversy leaves little doubt that Heenan was on the verge of victory when the action was stopped. Others say the match was a draw. However, according to Alan Wright's book "Tom Sayers: the last great bareknuckle champion", Heenan's attempted strangling of Sayers did not stop the fight, nor did the subsequent invasion of the ring by Sayers' supporters. This account says that order was nearly restored and the ring re-pitched yards away. The fight continued for four or five rounds with neither man able to box proficiently. When the Police were spotted at the edge of the field, the entire throng, including the fighters, made a bolt for it and the fight ended there.

The fight stirred up considerable public interest. According to one source: "newspapers were filled with frenzied denunciations, Parliament angrily discussed the question, Palmerston quoted, with every sign of satisfaction, a French journalist who saw in the contest a type of the national character for indomitable perseverance in determined effort".

Differences between the two men were finally patched up, and both were awarded a specially made championship belt at the Alhambra Theatre, London on 30 May 1860. The tour of England, Ireland and Scotland which they then undertook together was, however, only a partial success. On 4 June the fighters performed an exhibition bout at the Free Trade Hall in Manchester.

== After retirement from prizefighting ==
=== Involvement with the circus business ===
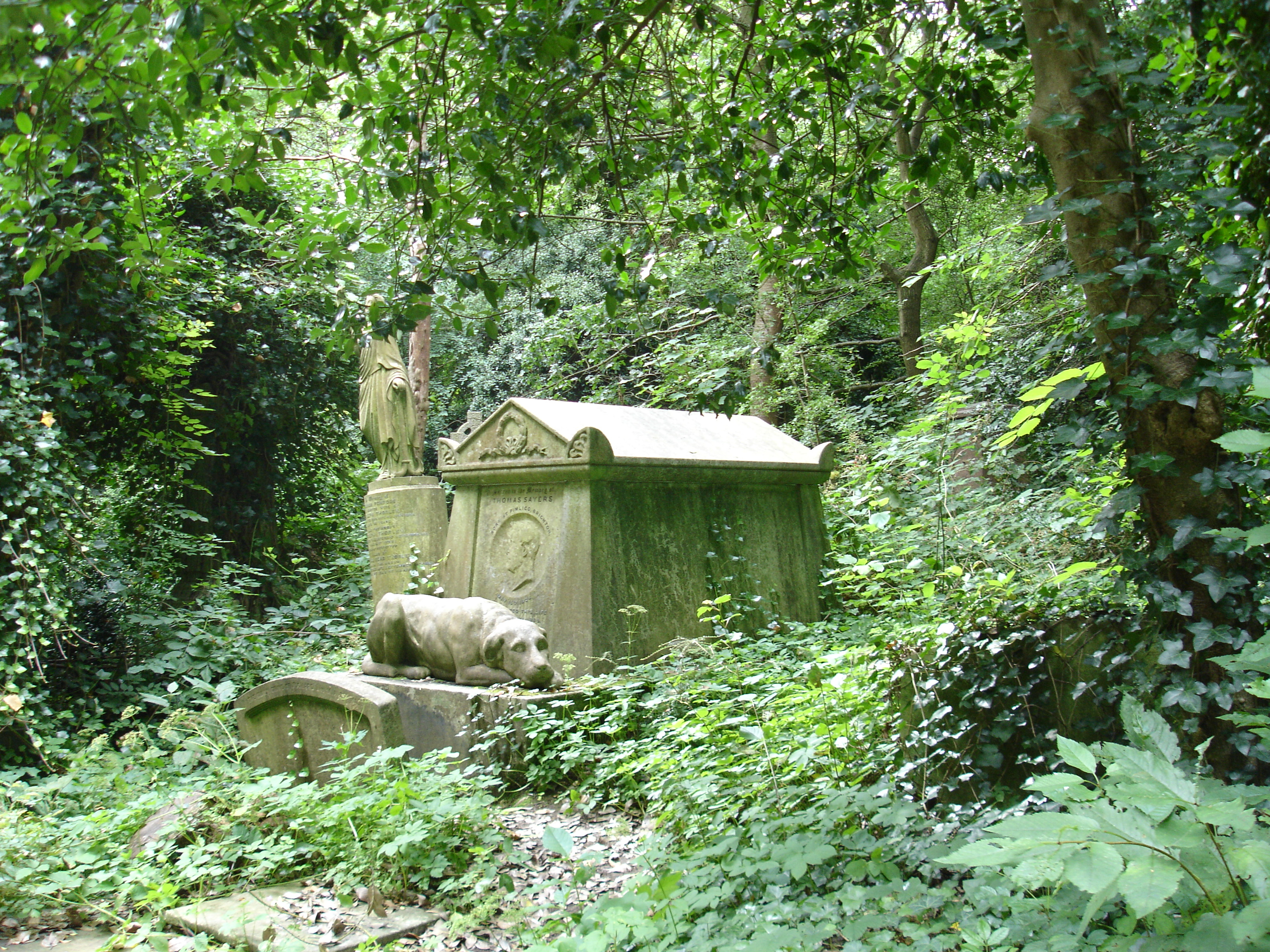
The tomb of Tom Sayers at Highgate Cemetery

After the Heenan fight of 1860, Tom Sayers never fought again. A public subscription was raised for him after the fight, and he received the sum of £3,000, enough to fund a comfortable retirement. This money was safely invested following the advice of John Gideon. In the Autumn of 1860, Sayers was engaged by the American circus company, Howes and Cushing, at a reported wage of £55 per week plus expenses. In October 1861, it was announced that Sayers had purchased the circuses of Howes and Cushing as well as "Jem Meyers's Great American Circus". Advertised as Tom Sayers' Champion Circus, pitched in the towns of Wisbech, March, Chatteris and Ely in April 1862 and described as "a mere wreck of what it was a few years earlier". It toured Britain but was sold off by auction in November 1862.

Sayers' marriage had broken down in the mid-1850s, after which time he and his two children had been living with a married woman called Charlotte. However, in early 1863, this relationship came to an acrimonious end, as the couple appeared in Clerkenwell Police Court, where Sayers accused Charlotte of breaking his windows and Charlotte accused him of breaking her furniture and throwing her out. The auction of his circus in 1862 did not end Sayers' involvement with the circus business, as in November 1863, it was reported that "Tom Sayers and his Company" would be putting on a combined performance with Howes's American Circus.

=== At ringside with Heenan ===
The bout with Heenan was Sayers' last prizefight. However, he made one last appearance in the prizefighting ring, when on 10 December 1863, he was one of Heenan's seconds, when the American returned to England to fight the then champion, Tom King. Heenan had been trained for the fight by his countryman, Jack MacDonald with the assistance of Hennan's brother, James. According to his own account, MacDonald only found out that Sayers would appear as his assistant on the morning of the fight, having been told that James Heenan would be fulfilling that role. Sayers' appearance was explained as conforming to the "etiquette of the profession". It was also speculated that Heenan's party may have hoped that Sayers' prestige, would "scatter dismay in the ranks of King's followers". However, it was clear from his appearance at the fight that Sayers was unwell and he was unable to assist Heenan during the fight, which Heenan lost. Sayers had bet heavily on Heenan, losing hundreds of pounds. In January 1864, legal proceedings were initiated against the fighters, seconds and other prominent participants in the prizefight. The proceedings concluded in April with the chief participants having to lodge £100 surety with the court in case of further court action. In Liverpool on 25 and 26 January 1864, Myers' American Circus was hired by John Heenan, who invited Sayers to recreate the "Great Battle of Farnborough". In June 1864, it was reported that Sayers was promoting a benefit evening for the boxer Jem Mace, hiring the Standard Theatre, Shoreditch for the occasion.

=== Illness and death ===
In December 1864, Sayers appeared in the betting ring together with Heenan at the Croydon Steeplechase meeting. Sayers was described as being "haggard, thin and wretched". In February 1865, Sporting Life reported that he was very seriously ill and confined to his house in Camden Town. A medical examination revealed him to be showing the symptoms of consumption aggravated by diabetes. It was also reported that Heenan had visited him and "spent some time in cheering up his great opponent of Farnborough".

In April 1865, Sayers was well enough to make a visit to Brighton, appearing "robust and strong" but by August, whilst staying with his sister, it became clear that the disease in his lungs meant he would not survive many weeks.

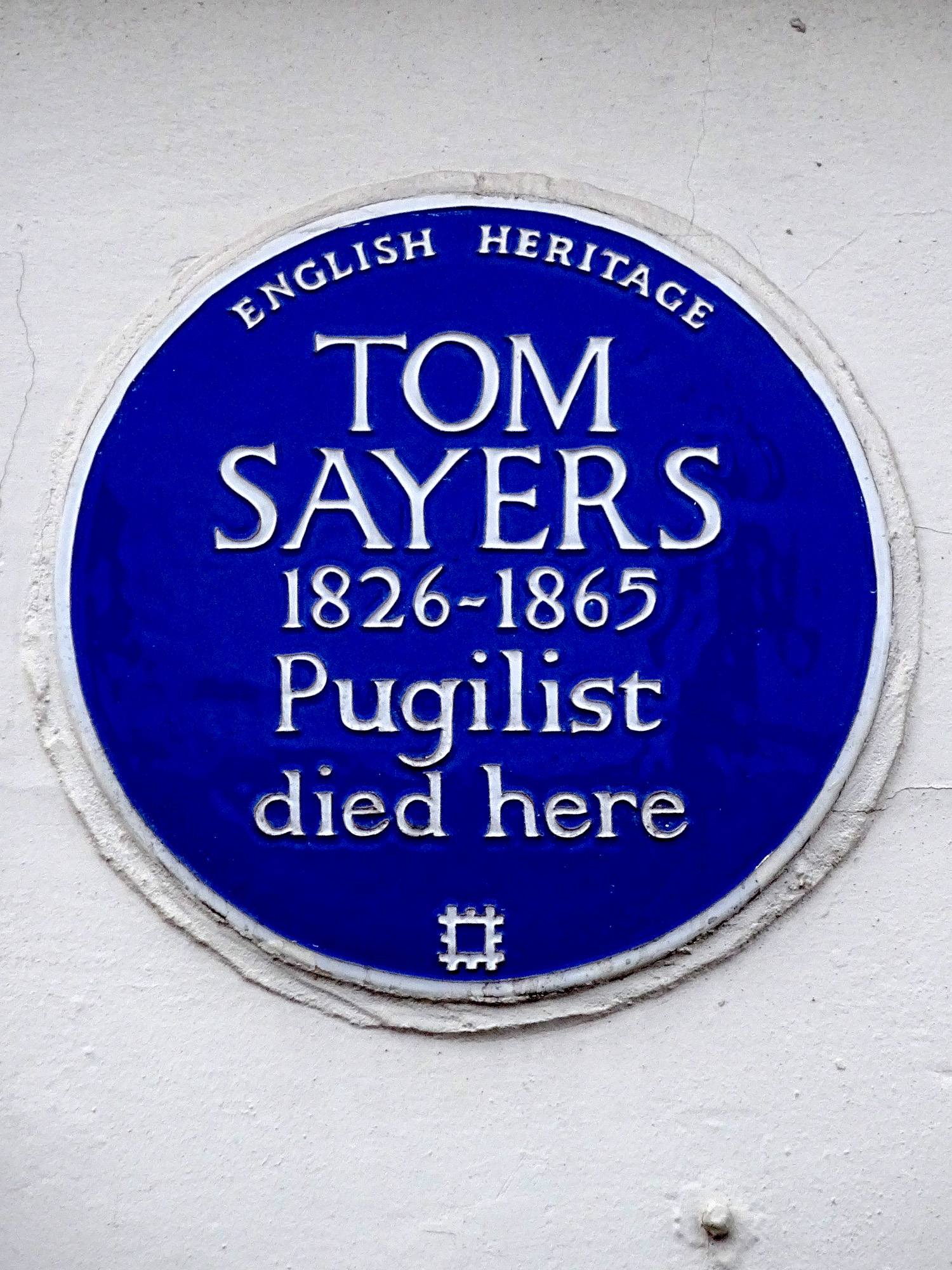
A blue English Heritage plaque marks the building where Sayers died

His last permanent address (1860–64) was at 51 Camden Street in Camden Town.

He died at No. 257 Camden High Street on 8 November 1865, in the presence of his father and two children and his funeral a week later attracted some 100,000 people to Camden Town. According to the Spectator magazine, the crowd that accompanied the coffin, stretched for more than two miles in length and the bier was drawn by four sable-plumed horses, Sayer's dog sitting alone in a pony cart.

Misfortune pursued him beyond the grave. His estranged (but not divorced) wife, who now had three sons by the man for whom she had left him, went to court to disinherit her two children by Sayers. The parents' subsequent marriage had not changed their legal status, and a judge ruled that, while they were certainly illegitimate, it could not be proved that Sayers was not the father of his wife's other three children. These must therefore be regarded as legitimate, and entitled to inherit his estate.

Tom Sayers is buried in Highgate Cemetery, his marble tomb, the work of the sculptor Morton Edwards, guarded by the stone image of his mastiff, Lion, who was chief mourner at his funeral. The house in Camden where he died now has an English Heritage blue plaque.

== Career record ==
12 Wins, 1 Loss, 3 Draws
Result	Opponent	Date	Location	Duration
Win	Abe Couch	1849-03-19	Greenhithe, Kent	13 minutes (6 rounds)
Draw	Dan Collins	1850-10-22	Edenbridge, Kent	1 hour 52 minutes (39 rounds)
Win	Dan Collins	1851-04-29	Long Reach, Kent	1 hour 24 minutes (44 rounds)
Win	Jack Grant	1852-06-29	Mildenhall, Suffolk	2 hours 30 minutes (64 rounds)
Win	Jack Martin	1853-01-26	Long Reach, Kent	55 minutes (23 rounds)
Loss	Nat Langham	1853-10-18	Lakenheath, Suffolk	2 hours 2 minutes (60 rounds)
Win	George Sims	1854-02-28	Long Reach, Kent	5 minutes (4 rounds)
Win	Harry Paulson	1856-01-29	Appledore, Kent	3 hours, 8 minutes (109 rounds)
Draw	Aaron Jones	1857-01-06	Canvey Island, Essex	3 hours (62 rounds)
Win	Aaron Jones	1857-02-10	Canvey Island, Essex	2 hours (85 rounds)
Win	Bill Perry	1857-06-16	Isle of Grain, Kent	1 hour 15 minutes (10 rounds)
Win	Bill Benjamin	1858-01-05	Isle of Grain, Kent	7 minutes (3 rounds)
Win	Tom Paddock	1858-06-15	Canvey Island, Essex	1 hour 20 minutes (21 rounds)
Win	Bill Benjamin	1859-04-05	Isle of Grain, Kent	22 minutes (11 rounds)
Win	Bob Brettle	1859-09-20	Ashford, Kent	15 minutes (7 rounds)
Draw	John C. Heenan	1860-04-17	Farnborough, Hampshire	2 hours 10 minutes (42 rounds)

== In fiction ==
A fictionalised Tom Sayers appeared in a series of weekly adventures penned for the story paper The Marvel by Amalgamated Press writer Arthur S. Hardy (real name Arthur Joseph Steffens, b. 28 September 1873) in the first decade of the twentieth century. Hardy's version of Sayers was an Edwardian actor-manager, touring Britain's theatres and music halls with staged recreations of his boxing triumphs in a career move very loosely based on the real Sayers's circus venture. This romanticised figure was revived and further developed as a central character in The Kingdom of Bones, a 2007 novel by Stephen Gallagher.

Tom Sayers is mentioned in Dorothy L. Sayers's mystery novel The Nine Tailors (1937). [The two Sayers were unrelated.]

Sayers appears in George du Maurier's first novel, Peter Ibbetson (Part Two).

A detailed account of the Sayers-Heenan fight appears in Hugh Walpole's The Fortress.

A recreation of the Sayers-Heenan fight is the event around which the action of Episode 13.6, The Noble Art, of Midsomer Murders revolves.
