= John C. Heenan =

American boxer (1834–1873)

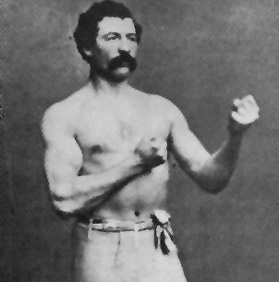
- Heenan, circa 1863

Personal information
- Nickname: The Benicia Boy
- Born: John Camel Heenan; May 2, 1834 West Troy, New York, U.S.
- Died: October 28, 1873 (aged 39) Green River Station, Wyoming Territory, U.S.
- Height: 6 ft 2 in (188 cm)
- Weight: 190 lb (86 kg)

Boxing career

Boxing record
- Total fights: 3
- Wins: 0
- Losses: 2
- Draws: 1

John Camel Heenan (May 2, 1834 – October 28, 1873), also known as the Benicia Boy, was an American bare-knuckle prize fighter. Though highly regarded, he had only three formal fights in his career, losing two and drawing one.

Heenan is best remembered for his second contest, when he traveled to England to fight British champion Tom Sayers. The bout ended in chaos when spectators broke into the ring and the police intervened. The referee finally called a draw. The Benicia Boy came home to a hero's welcome, but later returned to England, where he had just one more fight, losing controversially to new British champion Tom King. Heenan died at Green River Station, Wyoming Territory in October 1873, and is buried at St Agnes Cemetery in Menands, near Albany, New York.

== Early years ==
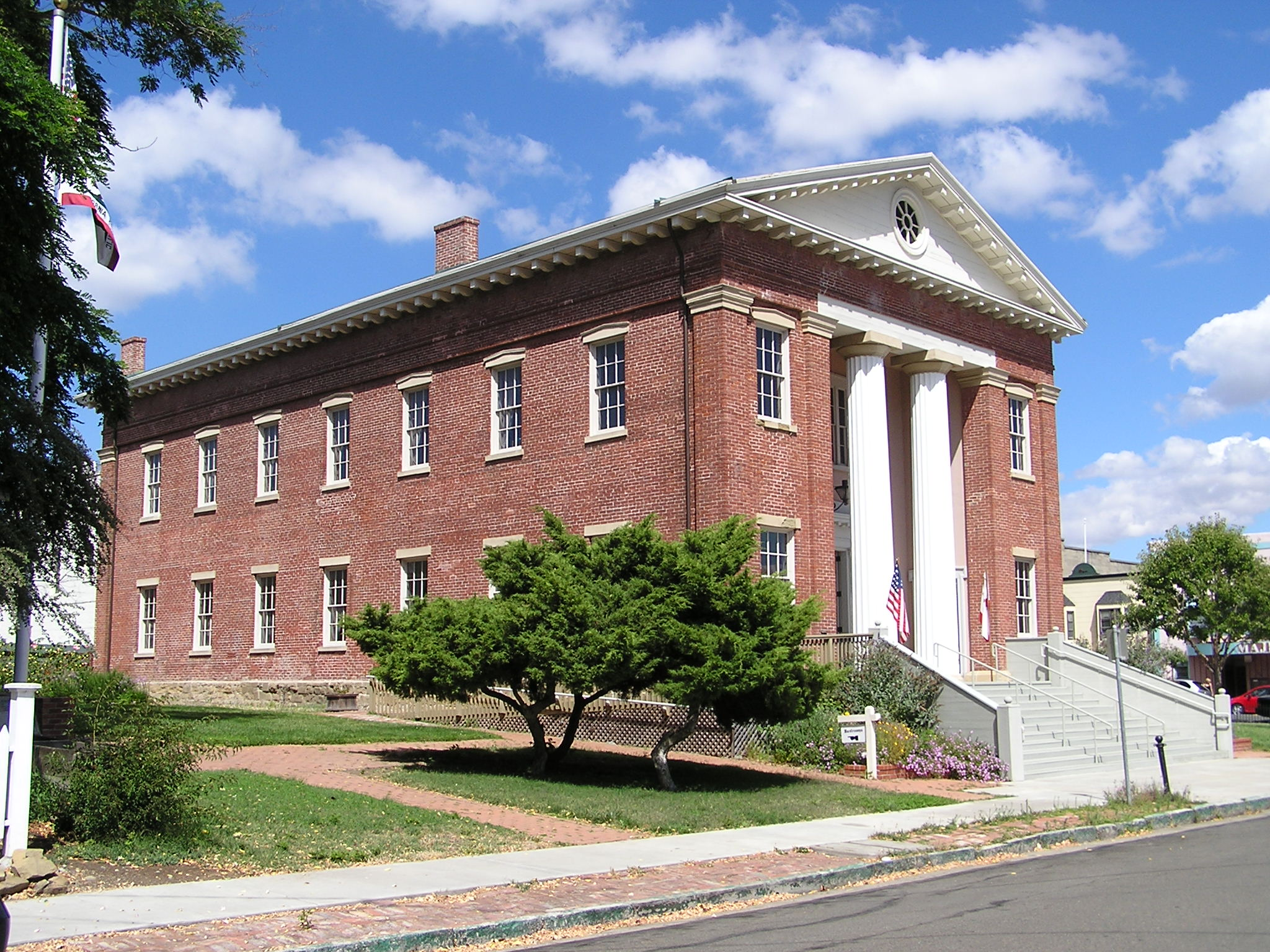
Benicia's state capitol was constructed during John Heenan's time there.

John Camel Heenan was born on May 2, 1834 in West Troy (now Watervliet) on the Hudson River. The family had emigrated from Templemore, County Tipperary, Ireland shortly before, and after receiving an elementary education, the boy began work at Watervliet Arsenal, where his father, Timothy Heenan was also employed.

At the age of seventeen, Heenan crossed the continent to California, which had become a lawless and chaotic place following the 1849 gold rush. There is no detailed record of what he did there, but the New York Clipper reports he was a local celebrity as a powerful boxer, and had proved uniformly successful in fights in private bar rooms. During his time in California he was also known to have spent some time in the workshop of the Pacific Mail Steamship Company in Benicia, which served as state capital in 1853–54.

Six feet two inches tall, and weighing around 190 pounds, his strength and endurance became legendary, and his success in many casual brawls earned him the nickname Benicia Boy. Spotting his talent, itinerant English trainer Jim Cusick took him to New York, where it might best be exploited. He was reported to have taken up residence in New York in the fall of 1857.

== Prize ring career ==
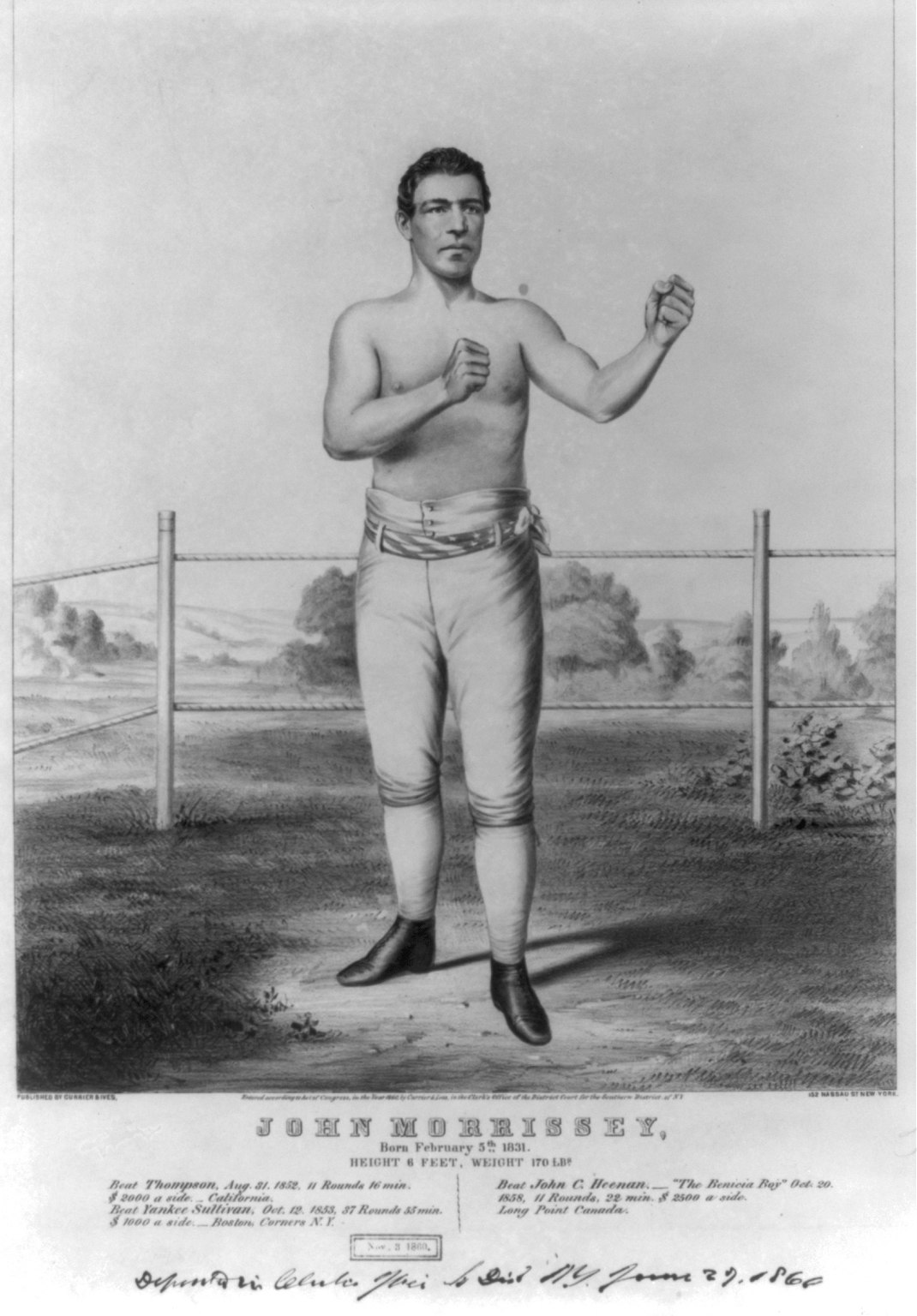
John Morrissey, the first opponent of John Heenan

The prize ring was in fact outlawed, but on December 10, 1857, Heenan fought a legal exhibition bout against Joe Coburn at the National Hall, Canal Street. He made a living as a "shoulder hitter" – a strong-arm man who might be hired for enforcement or protection in the seamy and often violent worlds of New York business and politics. His efforts earned him a sinecure in the New York Customs House.

=== The fight with John Morrissey ===
Jim Cusick, determined that his easy-going protégé should not rest on his laurels, pushed him to challenge for the national title. The American champion at this time was the Irish-born John Morrissey. Morrissey had been raised in Troy, near to where Heenan had grown up and had also been out to California during the gold rush. After much wrangling, the two men finally met in 1858 – in Canada, where the US authorities could not intervene. As well as there being a personal rivalry between the combatants, there was a social and political dimension to the fight as the nativist faction in the city tended to favour Heenan. The location of the fight, chosen by the Morrissey camp, was Long Point Island, about 80 miles from Buffalo. Stakes were set at $2500 a-side. Heenan was trained for the fight by the English prizefighter, Aaron Jones, who had recently fought and been beaten by Tom Sayers. Heenan, whose training had been disrupted by injury, and who was not fully fit, was an unlucky loser.

According to Alan Wright's account in The Great Prize Fight, Heenan damaged his right hand on a ring post early on in the bout, making him fight one handed. Even so, he was getting the better of Morrissey which incurred the wrath of Morrissey's supporters who had bet heavily on their man. They were well known for employing violent and unpleasant methods to help their man and some accounts say they stepped on Heenan's damaged hand every time he went down. One journalist reported that they would punch Heenan in the kidneys when he leaned against the ropes. The fight ended in the 11th round when Morrissey knocked out Heenan.

Morrissey, refusing a return bout, effectively retired from the ring. This was seen by many as indicating that Morrissey knew he could not get the better of Heenan in a fair fight. Heenan became champion by default, but had difficulty finding other opponents in America. Jim Cusick accordingly decided that his next fight should be against British champion Tom Sayers, to whom Heenan issued a challenge in 1859. Heenan crossed the Atlantic on the ship "Asia", landing in Liverpool on January 16, 1860.

=== The fight with Tom Sayers ===
Tom Sayers, Champion of England

The prize ring was also illegal in England, and by 1859 it was followed only by a small number of enthusiasts. But the Heenan–Sayers contest caught the public imagination in both countries. As Harper's Weekly put it, "the bulk of the people in England and America are heart and soul engrossed in a fight compared to which a Spanish bull-bait is but a mild and diverting pastime."

On the other side of the Atlantic, The Manchester Guardian observed that "no pugilistic contest ever decided has excited so great an interest, both in this and other countries, as the forthcoming conflict between Sayers and Heenan."

Heenan's training (unlike that of Sayers) was frequently disrupted by the interventions of police and magistrates, but by the day of battle he was in prime condition, and confident of victory over an opponent eight years older, forty pounds lighter and five inches shorter. The fight came off at Farnborough, Hampshire on April 17, 1860.

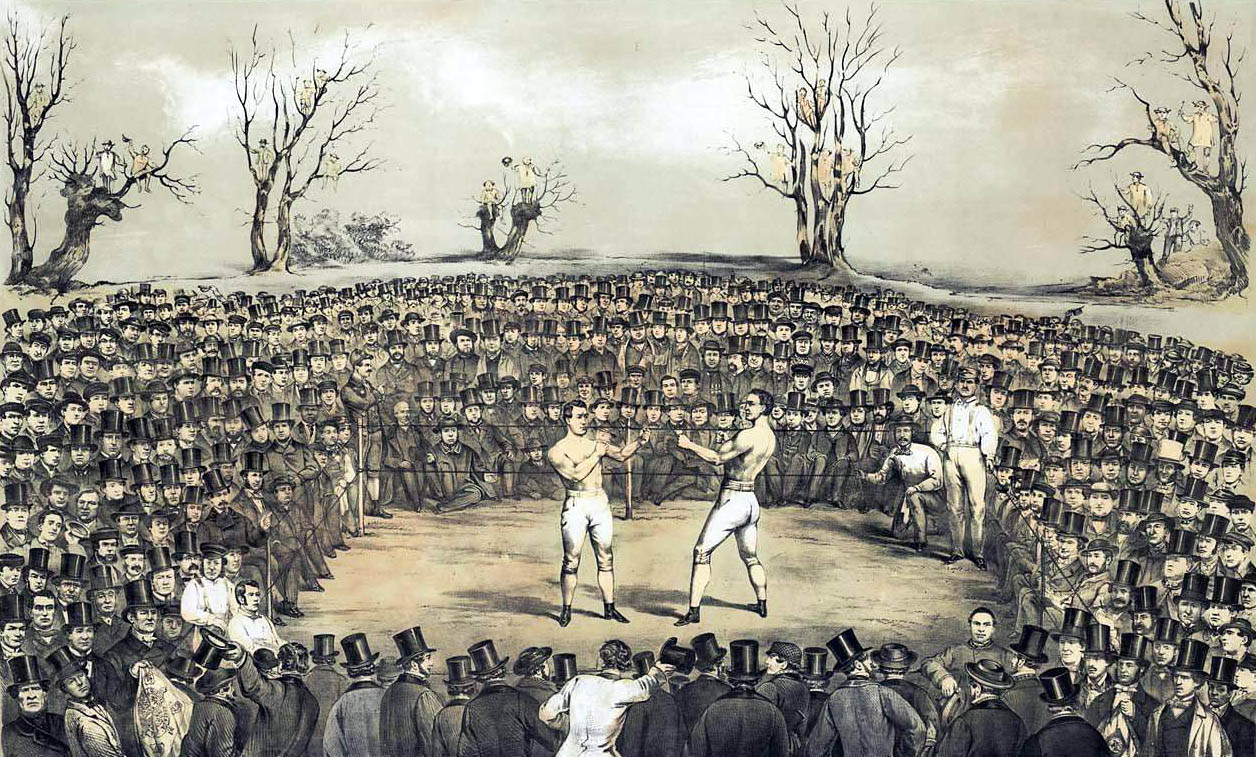
The Sayers–Heenan fight as depicted by ex-boxer Jem Ward.

In Heenan's corner were seconds, Jack MacDonald and James Cusick.

In a fierce and protracted battle, both men were handicapped from an early stage – Sayers by an injury to his right arm after it was hit with a heavy blow in the 6th round, and Heenan by being unable to see through his swollen right eye, an injury he picked up in the 7th round. The action went on for forty-two rounds spread over more than two hours, by the end of which Heenan's face was so cut and bruised as to be virtually unrecognisable (in addition to his right-eye being closed early in the contest, it was observed that his left eye was nearly shut in the 33rd round).

The defining moment came in the 37th round when Heenan almost illegally strangled Sayers by forcing his head down over the top rope. Amidst scenes of chaos, the ropes were cut, the crowd surged into the fighting area. Although it is generally believed that the police intervened at this point and stopped the fight, this was not the case.

The mayhem brought on by the ring invasion was brought to near-order and the ring was re-pitched yards away. The fight restarted with neither man able to box proficiently. Heenan was to say much later that he was nearly blind when the second bout began. The fight went on for five rounds until the police were seen approaching, causing the crowd and fighters to immediately disperse.

The referee had little option but to declare a draw, but the American Heenan complained bitterly that police had colluded with Sayers's supporters in breaking up the fight as soon as it became clear that the Englishman was beaten. Sayers's supporters protested that their man, not Heenan, had actually been the winner. The wrangling went on for some weeks.

Heenan loudly demanded a rematch, but Sayers's damaged arm made this impossible, and the two men were finally reconciled, each being awarded a championship belt. They then went on a joint tour of the country, but only the relative success of the Irish and Scottish legs of this tour redeemed the failure of the English part. Heenan returned to the United States, setting out on July 4, 1860. He was forced to leave his championship belt behind as it was kept as security against a sum of money advanced to the jeweller who had made the belt. A large crowd of "sporting men" thronged the London station from which Heenan departed on his way to Southampton to catch the steamer to America. When Sayers arrived with his little boy and Owen Swift to bid farewell to the Benicia Boy, there "commenced such cheering as had never been heard before between the walls of that station".

On his return, Heenan was given a hero's welcome and a gift of $10,000 raised by public subscription.

=== Championship fight with Tom King ===
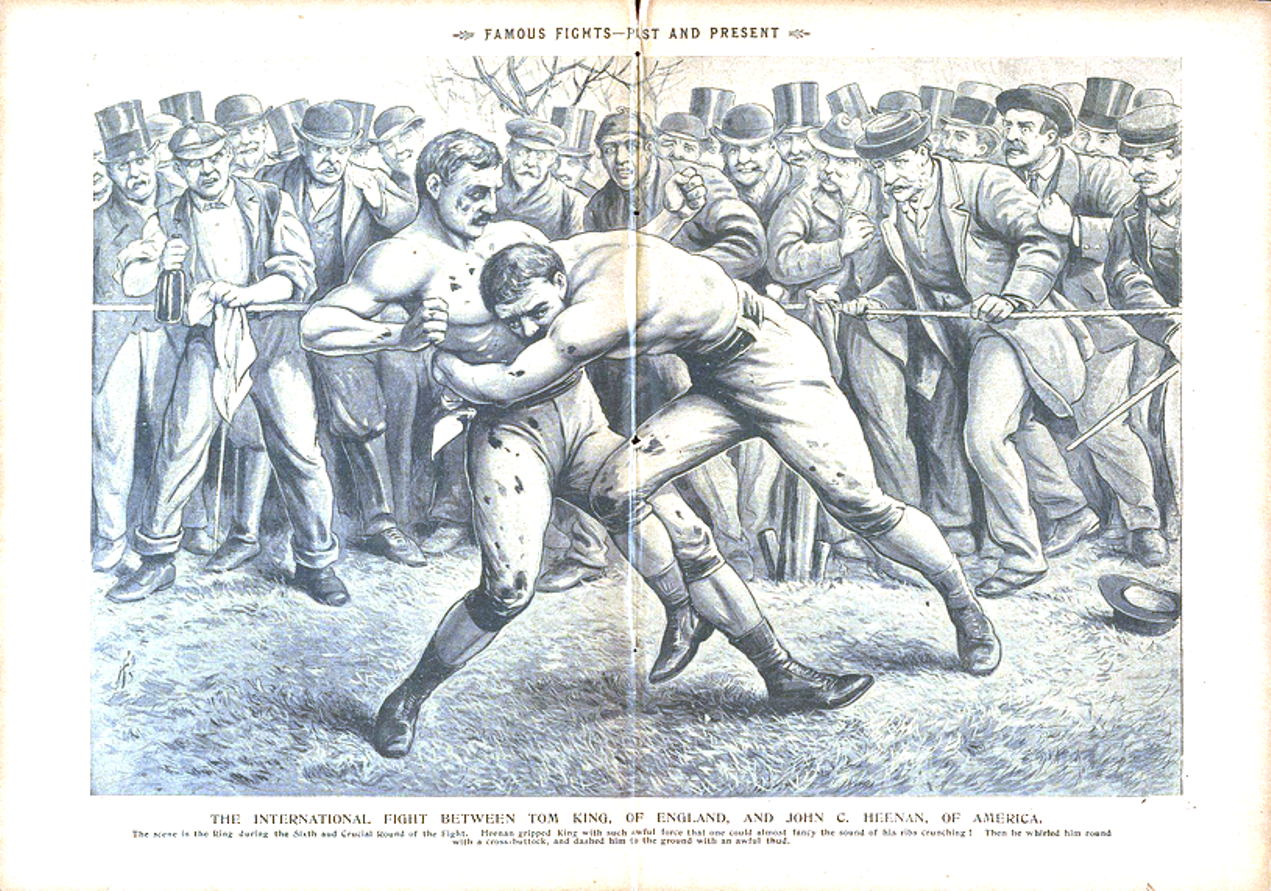
The International Fight Between Tom King, of England, and John C. Heenan, of America, 1863

Heenan did not remain long in the U.S. Just a year after the battle at Farnborough, the country was torn apart by civil war, and the Benicia Boy returned to England in March 1862. There the following year, by which time the surge in public interest in the prize ring had subsided, he fought once more for the championship on December 10, 1863 in Wadhurst.

His opponent was reigning champion Tom King, whom he was widely expected to beat. Articles for the fight with each side staking £1000 were signed on March 17, 1863. After a strong start with several successful throws, Heenan faded, and King, landing a series of blows to Heenan's face, knocked him out in the 24th round. The result was controversial: many American observers later agreed that King had been given longer than the rules allowed to recover from a knock-down in the eighteenth round, and Heenan claimed some time after the fight that his subsequent collapse occurred because he had been drugged.

Heenan had been trained for the fight by his countryman, John MacDonald. John Heenan's brother James had also helped to look after the fighter. On the morning of the fight, MacDonald was surprised to find out that Sayers would be his assistant in the corner, having been told that James Heenan would be fulfilling that role. In theory this switch should have been a sound decision, as Sayers had displayed crafty ring-tactics as a fighter. However, by this time, he was in the later stages of untreated diabetes and was of no help whatsoever to Heenan as the fight slipped away from him. Sayers had bet heavily on Heenan, losing hundreds of pounds on the fighter's loss. In January 1864, legal proceedings were initiated against the fighters, seconds and other prominent participants in the prizefight. The proceedings concluded in April with the chief participants having to lodge £100 surety with the court in case of further court action.

Heenan was in England at the time of Tom Sayers' funeral, but did not attend.

== After retirement ==
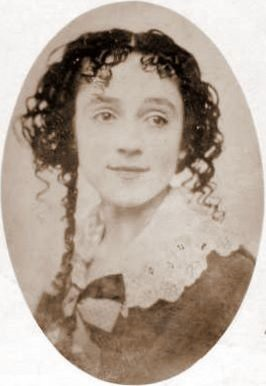
Adah Menken, 19

Heenan never fought again. After the King fight, he set himself up as a racetrack bookmaker in England and had some success until he was badly injured in a railway accident on June 9, 1864. He married the actress Adah Isaacs Menken on April 3, 1859, but by October 1861, she was "united to R. H. Newell, the humorist". Heenan and Menken were divorced in 1862 by an Indiana court. According to a biography of the actress: "it was generally known that Heenan had treated her in the most brutal and ignominious manner." In 1865 he returned to America, where he married actress Sarah Stevens, and had mixed success in the gambling business. In 1870 he appeared onstage with English fighter James Mace - the American as Hamlet and James Mace as Laertes in the "Great Fighting Scene". Eight years after his return to America, he became seriously ill with tuberculosis.

Quitting his New York home for the purer air of the west, he died at Green River Station, Wyoming Territory on October 28, 1873. His old manager, Jim Cusick, who was with him when he died, took his body back to New York for burial. His burial, on November 2, 1873 at St. Agnes Cemetery, Watervliet (now in the village of Menands, town of Colonie), was described in the New York Clipper.

== Career record ==
2 Losses, 1 Draw
Result	Opponent	Date	Location	Duration
Loss	John Morrissey	1858-10-20	Long Point, Canada	21 minutes (11 rounds)
Draw	Tom Sayers	1860-04-17	Farnborough, Hampshire, England	2 hours 10 minutes (42 rounds)
Loss	Tom King	1863-12-10	Wadhurst, Sussex, England	39 minutes (24 rounds)

Awards and achievements
Preceded by John Morrissey	Heavyweight boxing champion 1859–1862	Succeeded by Joe Coburn
