= Jem Mace =

British boxer (1831–1910)

James Mace

Personal information
- Nickname: The Gypsy / The Norwich Yokel
- Nationality: British
- Born: James Mace; 8 April 1831 Beeston, Norfolk, England
- Died: 30 November 1910 (aged 79) Jarrow, County Durham, England
- Height: 5 ft 9 in (175cm)
- Weight: Won Welter - Heavyweight titles Boxing range 136-175 lb (61.6 Kg -79.3 Kg)

Boxing career

Boxing record
- Total fights: 37* (3 No Decisions)
- Wins: 25*
- Win by KO: N/A
- Losses: 5
- Draws: 5

James "Jem" Mace (8 April 1831 – 30 November 1910) was an English boxing champion, primarily during the bare-knuckle era. He was born at Beeston, Norfolk. Although nicknamed "The Gypsy", he denied Romani ethnicity in his autobiography. Fighting in England, at the height of his career between 1860 and 1866, he won the English Welterweight, Heavyweight, and Middleweight Championships and was considered one of the most scientific boxers of the era. Most impressively, he held the World Heavyweight Championship from 1870 to 1871 while fighting in the United States.

== Early life ==
Mace was born the fifth of eight children to blacksmith William and his wife Ann Rudd Mace on 8 April 1831, in the remote village of Beeston, in rural Norfolk, England. Before boxing, he was an apprentice sawyer and violinist.

== Career ==
In the early 1850s, during his days as an exhibition boxer at Nat Langham's Rum Pum-pas boxing club at Cambrian Stores near what is now London's Charing Cross Road, Mace once boxed Archibald William Douglas, the 8th Marquess of Queensberry, known as Viscount Drumlanrig. Douglas had served as a former member of the House of Commons and was the father of John Douglas, credited with helping to establish boxing's modern Marquess of Queensberry Rules. During the same period and earlier, Mace completed what might be considered an apprenticeship in the boxing booth of former English middleweight champion Nat Langham, where he fought many talented amateurs, and a few men with the skills of professionals, touring and often performing at county fairs. He would continue to supplement his income by performing exhibitions and giving sparring and training sessions for Langham's boxing club in London's Westminster through the early 1860s. During his early work at county fairs, he was even known to play his violin to perform for the audience when he wasn't boxing amateurs and volunteers.

In one of his early bouts, at the age of 24, Mace defeated Bob Slack decisively on 2 October 1855 in Mildenhall, northeast of Cambridge, winning in nine rounds and only 14 minutes. On 17 February 1857, Mace defeated Bill Thorpe, an opponent close to his own height and weight, near Canvey Island, North of Kent, off the Thames Estuary in Essex, although the original location was the North Kentish marshes. Mace dominated the fighting and in the 18th round delivered a stinging left and right to Thorpe's nose, with the right causing a knockdown. Thorpe could not rise or continue the fight and his handler threw up the sponge ending the fight after 23 minutes. The match was fought for £50 a side, and saw a good crowd considering both men were novices. Pugilistica took note of Mace's speed, and the precision and strength with which he delivered his punches.

On 21 September 1858, Mace met Bob Brettle on the banks of the River Medway at Thames Haven, on the Essex Coast, for £100 a side, using London Prize Ring Rules, with Mace conceding the bout in only two rounds lasting three minutes. A number of boxing historians now consider the bout to have been for the Welterweight Championship of England. In a second attempt at Brettle, Mace took the Welterweight title in five rounds near Foolness Island, by Yanklett Creek in Essex.

On 25 January 1859, Mace met the undefeated Posh Price for £50 a side at Aldershot Common, Hampshire. In the 11th and last round, Mace hit Price with a strong blow on the left arm causing swelling, and likely a break. Price's seconds threw up the sponge after the injury became apparent in only 17 minutes of fighting. In a rough and damaging match, Mace displayed his characteristic scientific style of boxing. Mace was aged less than 27 in this early match, but his blows were hard and precise, and he showed his customary speed, which would serve him well in his later career.

Bob Travers

Mace met the black boxer Bob Travers on 21 February 1860. Travers, like Mace, was a friend of Nat Langham, and had boxed, and entertained, at his club at Westminster's Cambrian Stores. Mace would later compete against Travers in foot races. Their boxing match was for £50 a side, and they first fought six rounds off the Thames at the North Kent Marshes and then, after the police intervened, they moved to a second location which was closer to, but still to the southeast of London. By the 33rd and 34th rounds, it was evident that, though Travers tried to lead, Mace had the better defence, and continued to get in more and harder punches. Having had the better of the match, Mace finally won on a foul that occurred in the 57th round, when Travers appeared to intentionally throw himself on the ground to avoid his blow after one hour, thirty-one minutes of fighting.

=== English heavyweight champion, 1861 ===
Jem Mace, baseball card

On 18 June 1861, he first won the title of Heavyweight Champion of England by defeating reigning champion Sam Hurst in 8 rounds, and 40 minutes at Medway Island, Kent. Langham had carefully schooled Mace in the finer points of boxing. Though Hurst was as much as 50 pounds heavier, and at least three inches taller, he may have been better schooled and experienced in wrestling, and had broken his leg the year before, likely affecting his speed and form. He was considered by many to be an awkward boxer and to lack speed due largely to his weight and size. After taking a commanding lead, in the eighth, Mace stepped back after lightly hitting Hurst, who had lost nearly all ability to defend himself. Hurst unwisely made another charge, and Mace was forced to land another blow, after which Hurst's seconds threw up the sponge, ending the match after 50 minutes. Mace showed skill both in his defence and attack. Hurst, who fought relatively few professional bouts, retired from the ring not long after his loss.

=== Heavyweight title defences ===
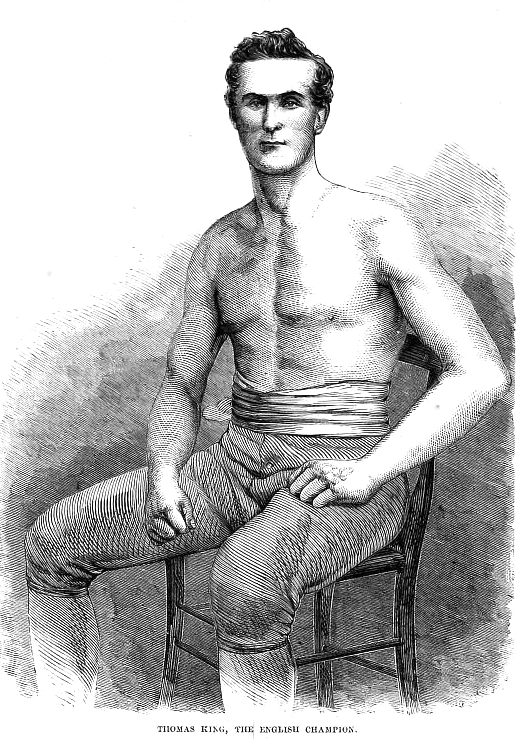
King, 1863

His victory over Hurst led to his first defence of the English heavyweight title against Tom King on a cold and rainy 28 January 1862 for £200 a side, before a crowd of around 400. This first title defence, staged in Godstone, England, was fought bare knuckle under London Prize Ring Rules and lasted for 43 rounds and 68 minutes. Mace had studied King and taken careful notes on his style, but King outweighed him by as much as 20 pounds and had a height advantage as well. For the first 30 rounds King fought evenly with Mace, the reigning champion, but in the second half of the fight Mace took control, and despite being nearly blinded in both eyes by King's blows in the early fighting, finished King with a crushing blow to the throat in the final round. In the 30th, Mace tripped King with the back of his heel, pushing him forward, and King fell hard, awkwardly landing on his head. In the 40th, Mace downed King with two uppercuts to the jaw, and fell upon him. In the 43rd and final round, Mace landed another uppercut to the jaw or throat prior to several close in blows, and then threw King who collapsed and was unable to rise. Mace's most prominent injuries were to the left side of his face and eye.

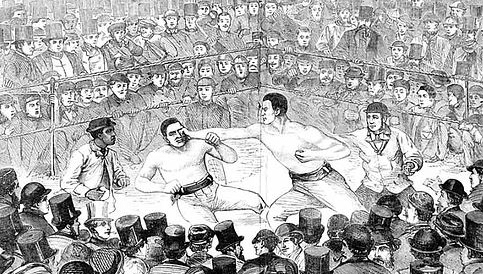
King shot a right to Mace's left eye in the 20th, causing a knockdown, Nov, 1862

Mace and King met at Medway, 28 miles from London for a rematch less than a year later on 26 November 1862 for £200 a side. King was four years younger than Mace, roughly four inches taller, and approximately 20 pounds heavier. Mace seemed to dominate the infighting, though the pace of King's blows may have been faster, and he appeared to have won the 13th. In the opinion of several ringside reporters, Mace had a moderate lead up until the 20th round, when he landed a left to King's face. At this point, Mace still led the betting at 4–1.

Windham Cup, Feb 1863

About to administer a similar blow, Mace's foot slipped slightly and King administered a strong right under his eye on the left side of his nose, sending him to the ground and nearly causing a knockout. In the 21st, King administered the same blow to Mace with his right, again knocking Mace to the grass, and causing the vanquished boxer's seconds to concede the match after 28 minutes of fighting. King took the heavyweight crown, and Mace and his seconds fully conceded the loss.

On 24 February 1863, Mace was presented the Windham Gold Cup, a boxing trophy, by Sir William Frederick Windham at Criterion Hall, the precursor to the modern Criterion Theatre, in recognition of his winning the heavyweight boxing championship of England. The trophy, said to contain 100 ounces of gold, was presented at Westminster's Leicester Square not far from Nat Langham's Cambrian Stores tavern and was considered to be worth £80,000 in modern currency.

=== English middleweight champion ===
Mace scores a left under Goss's defences, 1863

Mace was first recognised as English Middleweight champion on 1 September 1863, following his 19-round victory over Joe Goss, first staged at Wooton. The two boxers fought at catchweights of 10 stones, 10 pounds, or roughly 68 kg (150 lbs.), currently in the very light middleweight range. Very little fighting occurred at Wooton, and when the police intervened after 13 minutes, the fight was moved first to Bassett, then finally to Purfleet, Essex, near London. The purse was an exceptional £1000 to be split between the two boxers and the fighting ended at Purfleet after 18 rounds taking two hours and ten minutes. In the final round, Mace landed a right handed lunge to the left of Goss's jaw that knocked him out. Puglistica wrote that "Goss was entirely overmatched in science, length, and weight".

=== Regaining heavyweight championship ===
Mace shoots right to Goss's left eye, 1866

He regained the English heavyweight championship against Goss in a 21-round victory on 6 August 1866 between Purfleet, Essex, and Gravesend on the North bank of the Thames, 20 miles East of London. By one reliable account, the ring used was only 15 feet square, eight square feet shorter than the regulation size. Mace was said to be suffering from a strained left foot or ankle. In a close physical matching, Goss was nearly the same height, and only a few pounds lighter, at around 158 pounds. Goss, though he had the vitality of a man nearly seven years younger, did not gain from the advantage, as Mace's experience, skill, and conditioning seemed to count for more than the wear he had received from his years in the ring. Mace deftly avoided Goss's strong rushes with a shift of his shoulders or a bob of his head, showing great flexibility and speed. Mace could strike or counter quickly, particularly using his left, and often did so under Goss's defences, even in the early rounds where he scored early and with precision. Mace, in the 14th through 20th rounds, got the better of Goss, frequently striking his left eye with his right fist. At the end of the match in the 21st round, Mace remained strong, but Goss was groggy and weak. Mace was said to have very few injuries, but Goss had been battered around the "head, face, neck, and chest", with loosened teeth and badly battered eyes. In the final round, Goss's seconds threw up the sponge ending the fight when their boxer staggered in his attempt to land a blow on Mace, who defended himself by merely stepping aside.

Bare-knuckle boxing was an outlawed sport and both boxers, trainers, and seconds were often liable for arrest and prosecution. In 1867, Mace was arrested on the night before his scheduled title defence against Ned O'Baldwin in Woodford Essex, by the Metropolitan Police. He was held over in court not to fight again, and the incident influenced him to seek his fortune in America.

== America ==
In 1869 he relocated to the United States where prizefighting was still flourishing. He toured with the celebrated American boxer John C. Heenan, giving exhibitions of glove boxing.

=== World heavyweight champion, 1870 ===
Jem Mace at the Boston Theatre in 1871.

In what should be considered his most significant victory, on 10 May 1870, he defeated the English-born American boxer Tom Allen for a purse of $2500 a side or roughly the impressive sum of £3080, in a ten-round bout lasting around 45 minutes in Kennerville, Louisiana. The fight was for what is now considered by boxing historians to have been the heavyweight world championship, though it was often considered an American championship as well. Allen was ten years younger than Mace's advanced age of 39. Allen threw Mace in the sixth, but when he threw Mace again in the last round, he broke or dislocated his shoulder when he landed awkwardly on the ground. Allen had injuries to his eyes and mouth largely from lightning-fast left jabs, while Mace's face looked nearly untouched.

On 6 April 1871, Mace suffered a loss in New Orleans to Gentleman Jose Alonso.

He defended the heavyweight title in one of his last significant fights against Joe Coburn on 30 November 1871 in a ten-round draw at Bay, St. Louis, Mississippi, 40 miles from New Orleans. Both men were close in weight and height. The first scheduled title fight between the two, in 1864, did not go ahead as Mace failed to show. Coburn was furious that Mace had prevented him from participating in the lucrative match, which would have drawn a large crowd. In the November 1871 fight, Mace was thrown repeatedly, and took some hard falls. Coburn injured his right wrist in the fifth as he threw Mace hard over the ropes. In the eighth round, known as "chancery", Coburn held Mace around the head and punched him several times. In the tenth and eleventh, Mace's left hand becomes more swollen, and difficult to use. At the request of the referee, the fighters agreed to call it a draw in the 12th round, as neither was inclined to strongly engage the other, largely due to their injured hands. The torrential rain may have partly been the cause of the abbreviated match as it required the boxers to fight up to their knees in mud.

== Glove boxing ==
Following an attempt on his life in Mississippi, he returned to England. On the evening of 16 December 1876, he was back in America, this time as a glove boxer, and in an historic early clash for a purse of $100 under Queensberry Rules, he defeated Bill Davis at National Guard Hall at Virginia City, Nevada. In the last and ninth round, Mace found Davis's eye and scored, and when the fight was called at the end of the round with both men clinching, the total score was 52 for Mace and 32 for Davis. It was a convincing win for Mace who landed more blows, but Davis showed well against a top-rated opponent.

At the age of 58, on 7 February 1890, he fought a match with the much younger boxer Charley Mitchell of Birmingham in Glasgow, Scotland for the vacant English heavyweight title, but lost in four rounds.

== Exhibitions ==
As Mace rose to become the British champion he supplemented his income with exhibition work in the popular Victorian travelling circuses, becoming a circus proprietor himself for a short time. Most notably, he toured Lancashire with Pablo Fanque's Circus Royal in the late summer and autumn of 1861—Fanque being England's first black circus proprietor. Fanque was later honoured in the Beatles song "Being for the Benefit of Mr. Kite!"

In the summer of 1870, he gave three-round exhibitions in New Jersey and New York with American champion Joe Coburn.

In 1878–79, Mace had as many as 30 three-round exhibitions with John Thompson in Melbourne, Victoria, Australia, and two with the Australian champion he had mentored, Larry Foley. These exhibitions, fought with gloves, paved the way for the worldwide acceptance of gloved boxing, and eventually the newer Queensberry Rules which required new gloves for each boxer. In 1882 he toured New Zealand where he discovered future world heavyweight champion Bob Fitzsimmons. With the help of his protégé, Australian champion Larry Foley, he schooled a generation of mostly Australian boxers, including the Caribbean-born Peter Jackson, multiple-weight-class champion, British-born Bob Fitzsimmons, and Young Griffo. In 1883, he returned to America as manager of the New Zealander Herbert Slade. He toured extensively with Slade in exhibitions in the latter half of 1882 in New Zealand and in the first half of 1883, first in New York, and then back in England. Around 1885, he performed a benefit with his close friend and boxing partner Bill Clark in New York.

On 10 February 1883, Mace returned to England after the death of his son Edward Albert from drowning in the Thames, and resumed his English exhibitions by April of that year with Herbert Slade. In 1884, he performed English exhibitions with Ed Smith and Jack Smith and toured England with exhibitions against Jack Knifton and Charley Mitchell from 1886 to 1887. He continued to fight the occasional exhibition in England through 1895.

In December 1896, returning to New York City to fight Mike Donovan in a brief exhibition, he was acclaimed by world heavyweight champion James J. Corbett as "the man to whom we owe the changes that have elevated the sport". Mace continued his career exclusively as an exhibition boxer and his last recorded entry into the ring was in 1909 when he was 78 years of age. On 8 March 1897, he performed a four-round exhibition with former world welterweight champion Tommy Ryan in Syracuse, New York, before returning to England that Summer.

He continued to fight exhibitions in 1897, and in 1898 opened a boxing academy in Cape Town, South Africa. He performed exhibitions with Jack Valentine in Cape Town in 1903 and 1904.

== Other pursuits and death ==
Mace was a skillful violinist who originally aspired to a career in music and continued with the art through his career as a boxer. Some believe the destruction of his violin in his early life by three thugs in Great Yarmouth, Norfolk, and his subsequent anger and retaliation led him to a life in the ring. In 1856, he was credited with playing "The Cuckoo Song", and "Black Jack Davey" on his violin at the Strand, a supper club in London, while afterwards posing shirtless. In 1862 Mace began his own circus, appearing throughout England including Canterbury, Brighton, Ipswich, and Norwich through December of the year. Earlier in 1862, he had learned the trade and been well paid sparring in safe exhibitions with Tom King at Ginett's Circus, in Oxford, Portsmouth, and Exeter.

In 1870, Mace had a small role in the Shakespearean production of "As You Like It", on Broadway's Niblo Theatre in New York City and played several shows to crowded houses. Though he acted as a wrestler and spoke only a few lines of the script, the rougher patrons from New York's "Bowery" enjoyed his realistic portrayal of a wrestler and knew him as a famous heavyweight boxer.

=== Hotelier and saloons owner ===
In 1866, Mace became the proprietor of the Strawberry Gardens pleasure grounds at West Derby, Lancashire, near Liverpool a beautifully landscaped park which featured the sports of running, bowling, jumping, wrestling and boxing. Mace himself would often be featured in the boxing displays. At various times, he was also a professional runner, bar owner and keeper, circus proprietor and racehorse owner. The White Swan on Norwich's Swan Lane was one of the first inns from which he displayed his sign in the mid-1850s. He kept the Capitol Saloon in New York City for several years, on Twenty-Third Street in Manhattan. With his partner, Mace profited from his percentage of the gambling upstairs which included Faro, Roulette, Boston props, an old card game, Rouge et Noir, using red and black diamond cards, and other card games. The Saloon was frequented by notorious underworld criminals including shanghaier Shang Draper. John Morrissey, the former boxer, Dead Rabbits criminal gang leader, and Tammany Hall politician had a bloodless dispute in Mace's saloon. In 1871, Jimmy Haggerty, a gangster from Philadelphia, was mortally wounded in a bar fight in Mace's Saloon from a gunshot delivered by Reddy the Blacksmith, of the Bowery Boys gang. Mace later ran a hotel in Australia's Melbourne suburb of Flemington with boxer George Thompson as a partner. By 1881, while running his hotel, he owned racehorses, a few of which he ran in Australia's Melbourne Cup. In 1902, at the Coronation Tournament at London's Royal Albert Hall, Mace sponsored or participated in a show honouring the coronation of King Edward VII that combined boxing with wrestling, fencing, running, cycling and gymnastics, as part of England's National Sporting Club.

In his late sixties, after he returned to England, he ran the Black Lion Hotel on Coleshill Street in Birmingham.

== Personal life ==
Mace married three times, twice bigamously, and fathered at least fourteen children by five women. His wife in 1901, Alice (Nee Stokes), was 40 years his junior according to the census record for the Black Lion in Coleshill Street, Birmingham. He is believed by a few sources to have had an affair with famous American Louisiana-born actress Adah Isaacs Menken, who performed frequently in England.

During his life Mace made and gambled away a considerable fortune. After the death of his wife, according to one source, he began to lose his fortune rapidly, and in his last years lived on the English old-age pension of five shillings (5/-) a week and the generosity of friends.

== Death ==
Mace ended his life as a penniless street musician in Jarrow, Durham, with his death assigned to natural causes, and was buried in an unmarked grave at Anfield Cemetery, Liverpool, England. Funeral services were conducted by his son Alfred, a priest. Several sources reported that his total net worth acquired during his prime may have reached $1,000,000 in American 1910 currency or roughly £800,000 in the British currency of 1870, or £20,000,000 in today's currency. In 2002, the Merseyside Former Boxers' Association arranged an attractive black marble engraved memorial headstone for his grave.

=== Honours ===
Mace has a commemorative plaque on Swan Lane in the centre of Norwich, the site of the White Swan tavern which he ran.

Ring Magazine established a Hall of Fame in 1954, and most of their members subsequently became members of the International Boxing Hall of Fame. Mace was the 34th inductee to the organization in 1990.

He was a 2014 inductee for the Australian National Boxing Hall of Fame in the International category.

== In popular culture ==
"Lando", a western by Louis L'Amour calls him "the world champion prize fighter, an Englishman and a gypsy. He whipped the best of them, and he was not a large man, but he was among the first to apply science to the art of fist fighting." "By footwork you can shift a man out of position... Certain blows automatically create openings for the blows to follow." "Never weighing more than 160 pounds, he had been the world's champion, defeating men as much as 60 pounds heavier."

== Professional boxing record ==
No.	Result	Record	Opponent	Type	Round, time	Date	Location	Notes
39	Draw	27–5–7	(United States) Mike Donovan	PTS	4	3 Sep 1897	(United Kingdom) Olympic Club, Birmingham, England	
38	Draw	27–5–6	(United States) Mike Donovan	PTS	4	14 Dec 1896	(United States) Broadway Athletic Club, New York City, New York, U.S.	
37	Loss	27–5–5	(United Kingdom) Charley Mitchell	PTS	4	7 Feb 1890	(United Kingdom) The Glasgow Gaiety Theatre, Glasgow, Scotland	For English heavyweight title
36	Win	27–4–5	(New Zealand) George Belcher	TKO	4 (6)	28 Oct 1882	Theatre Royal, Christchurch, New Zealand	
35	Win	26–4–5	(United States) Bill Davis	KO	4	26 Jan 1877	(United States) San Francisco, California, U.S.	Marquess of Queensberry Rules
34	Win	25–4–5	(United Kingdom) Tom Allen	?	?	29 Jul 1876	(United States) Virginia City, Nevada, U.S.	
33	Win	24–4–5	(United States) Martin	?	?	15 Jun 1872	(United States) California, U.S.	
32	Draw	23–4–5	(United States) Joe Coburn	NC	12	30 Nov 1871	(United States) Bay St. Louis, Mississippi, U.S.	Retained English and World heavyweight titles
31	Draw	23–4–4	(United Kingdom) Tom Allen	NC	1	11 May 1871	Port Ryerse, Ontario, Canada	Retained English and World heavyweight titles
30	Win	23–4–3	(United Kingdom) Tom Allen	PTS	10	10 May 1870	(United States) Kennerville, New Orleans, Louisiana, U.S.	Retained English heavyweight title; Won World heavyweight title
29	Win	22–4–3	(United Kingdom) Joe Goss	PTS	21	6 Aug 1866	(United Kingdom) Purfleet, Essex, England	Won English heavyweight title
28	Draw	21–4–3	(United Kingdom) Joe Goss	NC	1	24 May 1866	(United Kingdom) Longfield Court, Kent, England	For English heavyweight title
27	Win	21–4–2	(United Kingdom) Joe Goss	KO	19	1 Sep 1863	(United Kingdom) Thames Haven, Kent, England	Won English middleweight title
26	Loss	20–4–2	(United Kingdom) Tom King	PTS	21	26 Nov 1862	(United Kingdom) Thames Haven, Kent, England	Lost English heavyweight title
25	Win	20–3–2	(United Kingdom) Tom King	KO	43	28 Jan 1862	(United Kingdom) Godstone, Surrey, England	Retained English heavyweight title
24	Win	19–3–2	(United Kingdom) Sam Hurst	KO	8	18 Jun 1861	(United Kingdom) Medway Island, Kent, England	Won English heavyweight title
23	Win	18–3–2	(United Kingdom) Bob Brettle	KO	5	20 Sep 1860	(United Kingdom) Yantlet Creek, Essex, England	Won English middleweight title
22	Draw	17–3–2	(United Kingdom) Bob Brettle	PTS	6	19 Sep 1860	(United Kingdom) Clinch's Farm, Oxfordshire, England	For English middleweight title
21	Win	17–3–1	(United Kingdom) Bob Travers	DQ	57	21 Feb 1860	(United Kingdom) North Kent Marshes, Kent, England	
20	Draw	16–3–1	(United Kingdom) Bob Travers	PTS	6	20 Feb 1860	(United Kingdom) North Kent Marshes, Kent, England	
19	Win	16–3	(United Kingdom) Posh Price	KO	11	25 Jan 1859	(United Kingdom) Aldershot, Hampshire, England	
18	Loss	15–3	(United Kingdom) Bob Brettle	KO	2	21 Sep 1858	(United Kingdom) Medway, Kent, England	For English middleweight title
17	Win	15–2	(United Kingdom) Bill Thorpe	PTS	18	17 Feb 1857	(United Kingdom) Canvey Island, Essex, England	
16	Win	14–2	—N/a	?	?	1856	(United Kingdom) Rum-Pum-Pas, London, England	
15	Win	13–2	(United Kingdom) Mo Betson	TKO	?	1856	(United Kingdom) Rum-Pum-Pas, London, England	
14	Win	12–2	(United Kingdom) Jonny Walker	TKO	?	1856	(United Kingdom) Rum-Pum-Pas, London, England	
13	Win	11–2	(United Kingdom) Archibald William Douglas	?	?	1856	(United Kingdom) Rum-Pum-Pas, London, England	
12	Win	10–2	(United Kingdom) Bob Slack	KO	9	2 Oct 1855	(United Kingdom) Mildenhall, Suffolk, England	
11	Loss	9–2	(United Kingdom) Nickels	?	?	1853	(United Kingdom) England	
10	Win	9–1	(United Kingdom) Gutteridge	?	?	1853	(United Kingdom) England	
9	Win	8–1	(United Kingdom) Lincolnshire Bulldog	?	?	1853	(United Kingdom) Rampling Horse, Lancashire, England	
8	Win	7–1	(United Kingdom) Tom Harvey	KO	31	12 Nov 1852	(United Kingdom) Harlaston Fair, Staffordshire, England	
7	Win	6–1	(United Kingdom) Martin	?	?	1851	(United Kingdom) England	
6	Win	5–1	(United Kingdom) John Pratt	KO	8	14 Jan 1851	(United Kingdom) Drayton Becker, Norwich, England	
5	Win	4–1	(United Kingdom) Farden Smith	KO	5	1850	(United Kingdom) Norwich Hill, Norwich, England	
4	Win	3–1	(United Kingdom) Tom Brewer	KO	?	1850	(United Kingdom) Horncastle Fair, Lincolnshire, England	
3	Loss	2–1	(United Kingdom) John Pratt	KO	50	17 Apr 1850	(United Kingdom) Drayton Becker, Norwich, England	
2	Win	2–0	(United Kingdom) Charles Pinfold	KO	4	1845	(United Kingdom) Norwich Hill, Norwich, England	
1	Win	1–0	(United Kingdom) Sydney Smith	KO	?	1845	(United Kingdom) Wisbech, Cambridge, England	

== See also ==
- List of bare-knuckle boxers
