= Nat Langham =

English boxer

- In common stance with legs apart and left extended, circa 1861

Personal information
- Nickname: Old Nat
- Nationality: British (United Kingdom)
- Born: Stephen Nathaniel Langham; 1 May 1820 Hinckley, Leicestershire, England
- Died: 1 September 1871 (aged 51) Leicester Square, Westminster, London, England
- Height: 5 ft 10 in (1.78 m); Varies upward slightly in records
- Weight: 154 lb (70 kg), middleweight Approximate range 150-160 lb

Boxing career
- Stance: Orthodox; Long reach, right handed Used London Prize Ring Rules

Nat Langham (20 May 1820 – 1 September 1871) was an English middleweight bare-knuckle prize fighter. He had the distinction of being the only person ever to beat Thomas Sayers while defending the English middleweight championship. Langham first took the championship by defeating George Gutteridge on 23 November 1846. Langham was considered a scientific boxer, and known for using sharp, well-timed blows, particularly with his left, though he was right handed. He was a 1992 inductee into the International Boxing Hall of Fame and a mentor to the British boxers Tom King and Jem Mace.

== Early life ==
Stephen Nathaniel Langham was born to Nathaniel and Mary Langham, frame knitters of stockings, amidst the slum-like conditions of Cross Keys Yard on Upper Castle Street in Hinckley, Leicestershire in May 1820. He always spoke with a speech impediment, the result of a childhood incident when at eight he stole a hot potato from a market stall—caught in the act, the vendor thrust the steaming potato into his mouth, causing severe permanent tissue scarring. He said later in his life that he laboured in the fields as a child but this may have been a story he invented as a result of the shame and resentment he felt from the impoverished urban environs of his early life. Sources concur that he later made his way to Leicester where he was hired to help deliver goods by horse and cart. He started to box in the early 1840s, fighting with "rural roughs".

Langham grew to around 5 ft 10 in (1.78 m) tall, and 11 stone (150 lb; 70 kg) in weight. The poverty he experienced in his childhood caused him to suffer ill health all his life, and he was said to have weak lungs.

== Career ==
After a neighborhood brawl, he was discovered by Leicester pugilist Dick Cain, and learned to box at Cain's sparring rooms at the Castle Tavern, at Leicester's 43 Gallowtree Gate. After studying his craft, Langham became known as a scientific boxer with quick, well-timed hands and great skill in his left. His closing style was to jab his opponent's eyes until they closed; His finishing blow, the "pick-axe" was a left hook that started low. During his career, boxing was an illegal clandestine profession, carried out in comparative secrecy, so his fights and the ones he later arranged, occurred in remote spots, and rarely near London city limits.

=== Middleweight champion, 1842 ===
Langham first took the English Middleweight title for the modest sum of £5, on 9 February 1842, according to the records of the International Boxing Hall of Fame, in an eighth round knockout against the older, larger, and more experienced William Ellis of Sapcote, near Langham's birthplace of Hinckley, Leicestershire, England. Ellis gave up the fight in the eighth after having his eyes blackened and other clear marks of heavy and frequent blows.

Langham fought a non-title bout on 7 May 1844 against Tom Lowe, winning the bout when Lowe unexpectedly conceded the match in the 43rd round. Ben Caunt had some influence in arranging and approving the match. The bout was described as a "curious, scrambling affair" by the sporting publication Bell's Life.

Langham defeated Doc Campbell, known as the "Brighton Bomber" on 12 June 1845, in a twelve round match that went 27 minutes.

On 23 September 1846, Langham defended what most boxing historians now believe was the English middleweight title against George Gutteridge at South Farm Pastures, three miles from Bourne, England in an 93rd round knockout, taking only twenty-three minutes to complete. The championship bout was fought for £25 a-side. Gutteridge took a defining lead in the first half of the bout, striking several blows that floored Langham. But Gutteridge had received punches to both eyes in the early fighting and eventually tired by mid-fight. After he recovered from a hard fought early bout, in the 53rd round Langham gained a second wind, and landed a series of lefts and rights at arm's length, followed by a near knockout blow that sent Gutteridge into a heap near his corner. In most of the subsequent short rounds, Langham dealt blows to Gutteridge, who often went to the ground after being hit to avoid further attack. This continued until Gutteridge became too fatigued to throw Langham or strongly counterpunch, until the 93rd and final round when Gutteridge's second, Hodgkiss called the fight.

Langham met William Sparks on 4 May 1847 in a 67 round win at Woking Common before a very select crowd of 100 and an impressive purse of £50 a side. Langham dominated with a more scientific style until the 62nd round when in a fall, he fell on his back with Sparks on top of him, unintentionally breaking Sparks's hand as it was squeezed between his back and the ground, putting his opponent at a decided disadvantage. In the remaining five rounds, Sparks could fight only with his remaining hand, and Langham easily found his mark using both hands against the limited ability of his opponent. Finally in the 67th round, Sparks' second Johnny Broome threw up the sponge to end the match.

==== Only career loss vs. Harry Orme ====
Orme, 1853

Langham, fighting at 158 pounds, lost his only career bout on the evening of 6 May 1851 for £50 a side against Harry Orme in an 117 round knockout that took two hours and forty-seven minutes to complete. The fight took place at Lower Hope Point, within twenty-five miles of London off the River Thames, near what is now London Gateway Park and was attended by Lords, Lawyers, celebrities, and well known boxers. Though Langham had a slight height advantage, Orme, who was younger and weighed more, threw him in the sixth round, and Langham may never have fully recovered from the fall. Orme threw Langham again in the eleventh. Though Langham continued to apply his left near the end, after 117 rounds had been fought, his seconds threw up the sponge to end the match, after being thrown again in the closing rounds.

=== Defeating Thomas Sayers, 1853 ===
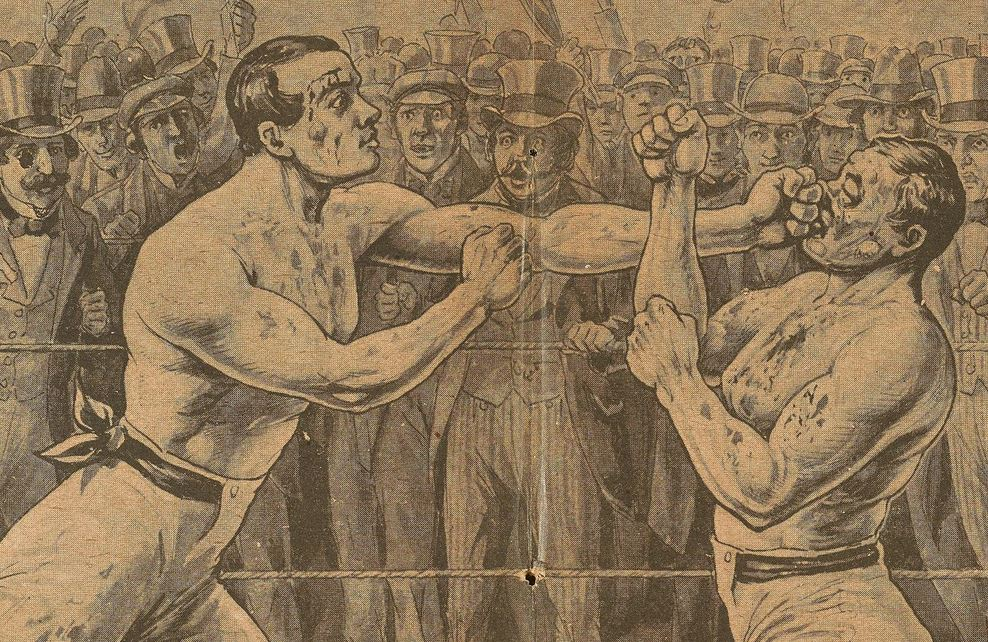
With his strong left, Langham striking Sayers's over his defenses on his face and eyes

In spite of the small prizes available, his prowess in the ring earned him a considerable fortune. After having worked as a bar keep and boxing tutor at public house in Cambridge, Langham came out of his temporary boxing retirement and fought for the English middleweight championship for the last time on 18 October 1853. In the victory for which he became best known, Langham defeated Thomas Sayers, in a 61 round knockout in two hours at Lakenheath, Suffolk, England, twenty miles Northeast of Cambridge, before two thousand who paid admission and as many as a thousand more who waited outside to see the match. Some sources note that Sayers had not been in his best health prior to the match, suffering from a bout of influenza. By the 30th round, Langham appeared weak, but he fought with skill and continued to land such well placed blows to the face of Sayers that it appeared his opponent would soon lose all vision. It was clear by the 56th round that Sayers's vision in both eyes would not last much longer from the frequent blows of Langham. Puglistica wrote that in the final rounds, "it was beyond a doubt now that Sayers could not see what he was doing" and his backers called for him to be taken away. By the 60th round Langham landed three or four telling blows, and in the following round, Sayer's seconds gave up the match. The Era of London considered the match, "game, scientific, and manly", and emphasized that despite the short rounds and hard fighting, it was apparent that the contestants fought a scientific, somewhat finessed battle.

After retiring from the ring, Nat married Elizabeth Watson on 10 December 1853 at St Martins in the Fields, near his home in Westminster. His mentor and promoter Ben Caunt stood as one of the witnesses. The couple had two sons who both died in childhood, and two daughters, Alice and Elizabeth. In his boxing retirement, he became the matchmaking manager of the first official English heavyweight champion, Jem Mace, and occasionally mentored Mace's student Tom King. Mace also performed as one of the boxers at Langham's Rum Pum-Pas boxing club.

==== Fight with Ben Caunt, 1857 ====
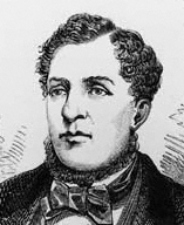
Ben Caunt

Langham met his mentor and promoter Ben Caunt, a former claimant of the English heavyweight title, on Stanley Island, off England's River Medway in a sixty round draw, fought in one hour and twenty-nine minutes, on 22 September 1857. Langham was attended by his recent boxing adversary and friend Tom Sayers and fought for a substantial purse of £200. Caunt was the Uncle of Langham's wife, and it is odd he would seek to fight his own mentor and business manager. What prompted Langham to come out of boxing retirement may have been a family dispute between each boxer's wife, for which he wished to settle the score. Caunt was nearly three inches taller and forty pounds heavier, and confident he would win the match, though the reporter for Puglistica noted that Caunt looked fitter and healthier than Langham prior to the commencement of the match. As the battle progressed, Caunt became somewhat perplexed he could not land his best blows against Langham's speed and defenses. Langham fought scientifically and landed precise blows, while still evading Caunt, who injured his hand against the stakes of the ring in the 51st round. For the next eight rounds, Langham had the advantage, though he occasionally went down hard as Caunt landed a few blows with his single remaining hand. In the sixtieth round, the combatants were persuaded to end the bout, and they shook hands. Langham, who ended the fight with a clear advantage, later protested the referee's decision to call the bout a draw and hoped for a rematch, but none ever occurred, as neither men's backers planned for one. The owner of the land that hosted the event brought a complaint to recover £10 from Caunt for damage to his property, including some fencing, by the unruly crowd, and a similar action was brought against Langham.

== Careers outside boxing ==
In his early boxing retirement, Langham opened a boxing booth, a place where boxers could spar or fight exhibitions for the entertainment of crowds, often conducted at county fairs in the London area. In the first half of 1853, after the Orme fight, Langham set himself up at the Ram Inn on Bridge Street in Cambridge where he kept the Inn and found a number of boxing students from Cambridge University, Trinity College, and the surrounding area. He became one of the first boxing champions to introduce boxing as a sport to College students.

=== Cambrian Stores tavern, 1853 ===
Moving back to London, Langham opened the Cambrian Stores, a London area tavern or public house on what is now Charing Cross Road, where he lived out most of his remaining life as an inn keeper or publican in a prosperous side of the city in Westminster near Covent Gardens. Capitalizing on his fame as a boxer, Langham had placed a well lit sign outside his pub that read "King of the Middleweights". From his tavern, he sometimes clandestinely sold tickets to several matches including the Tom King, Jem Mace bout in 1862, as he knew Mace well.

In an 1860 letter to the London Times, a concerned observer wrote that the preliminaries of prize-fights were staged at the Cambrian Stores club, and that the boxers were weighed there before the bout, and appeared after the bout. There was sparring, singing and dancing at the club nearly every night. The dancing was with heavy clogs and pipes and was noisy. Before, during, and after every great fight, between 2,000 and 3,000 of the lowest and most lawless London underclass assembled with swearing, struggling, sparring and shouting. They crowded Langham's Cambrian Stores and surrounding streets worrying the police and compelling the frightened neighbors to close their shops.

Nat’s wife Elizabeth died from peritonitis on 3 October 1860 at their home at Cambrian Stores. In the 1861 census of London Langham appears as a victualler or inn keeper and as a widower living on Castle Street, the address of Cambrian Stores.

=== The Rum Pum-Pas Club ===
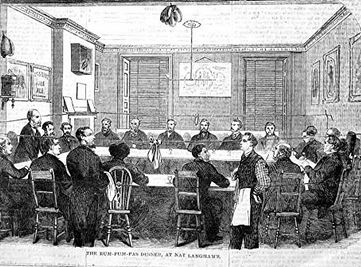
Dinner at Rum-Pum-Pas, circa 1867 Note ropes of prize ring

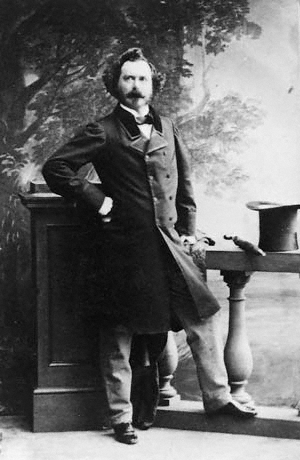
Sir Robert Peel

As a more lucrative venture, he also opened the Rum Pum-Pas Club, in the early 1850s, on an upper floor of his Cambrian Stores in Westminster, which offered dining, boxing instruction, and boxing matches for wealthy and aristocratic patrons of the boxing arts. His patrons included high ranking naval officers, powerful businessmen, and members of Parliament. Several upper crust boxing students and alumni from Cambridge University were boxing students of Langham when he lived in Cambridge and may have remained supporters of his club. Tom Sayers found a worthy adversary to box and spar with at the club when his career was flagging. Morning boxing matches for purses were staged in the club and sometimes in remote spots closer to Epsom, and were often preceded by lengthy late night meals followed by the Club's prized plum pudding. Bouts inside the club sometimes featured boxers fighting in the nude, for the unique tastes of some of the aristocratic patrons. Meals were famously consumed inside a regulation 24 square foot boxing ring, despite the tight fit as Langham acted as Master of Ceremonies. Aristocratic patrons included James Grimston, known as Lord Verulam, a former member of both the House of Lords and Commons, Lord Caledon, and Admiral Lord Edward Russell. Other wealthy patrons included Lord Robert Grimston, brother of James, Sir Robert Peel, amateur boxer and son of the Prime Minister, and Robert's brother Royal Navy Captain William Peel, also an accomplished amateur boxer. Other distinguished patrons included the Royal Navy officer William Hope-Johnstone and Brown and Harris of the London Stock Exchange. Jem Mace claimed to have once boxed Archibald William Douglas (1818-1856), the 8th Marquess of Queensberry, known as (Viscount Drumlanrig) at the Club. Douglas had served as a former member of the House of Commons and was the father of John Douglas, credited with helping to establish boxing's modern Marquess of Queensberry Rules. The top rated boxers, Cambridge students, and aristocracy who frequented the Club cemented Langham's legacy, and place in society. When Langham died, the fights and sparring matches staged there moved to retired boxer, club patron, and good friend Alex Keene's "Two Tuns" Tavern.

=== Loss of Cambrian Stores Tavern ===
In April 1860, the Westminster licensing board turned down an appeal to have Mace's publican license renewed for his Cambrian Stores Tavern, likely due to the low standing of boxers, constant noise from the crowds both inside and outside the club, and a recent assault and robbery that had occurred at his public house. Langham had sold his share of the Cambrian Stores public house by October 1861 though he continued to act as a boxing promoter, and second. In his later years, Langham was host of the "Mitre" Tavern on London's Upper St. Martin's Lane, another location familiar to the boxing crowd that staged the occasional bout. The Mitre was only a few miles from his former pub at the Cambrian Stores on Castle Street, and he remained at the Mitre at least through 1868 acting as both barkeep and landlord.

Langham died of consumption on 1 September 1871 at his house at Cambrian Stores, Castle Street, Leicester Square, Westminster, at the age of 52 in London. Although prosperous during his life, it is believed he left a personal estate of less than £100. He is buried in London's historic Brompton Cemetery in the Royal Borough of Kensington and Chelsea, and though his memory survives, his simple grave and casket have fallen into disrepair.

A blue plaque now commemorates Langham's place of birth on Church Street, Hinckley, and a road "Langham Close" now bears his name.

== Selected fights ==
8 wins, 1 loss, 1 draw, English Champion 1843-53
Result	Opponent(s)	Date	Location	Duration	Notes
Win	Bill Crozier	1842	England	8 rounds	
Win	Ned Ellis	1842	England	8 rounds	
Win	William Ellis	9 February 1843	Near Hinkley, Leicestershire, England	8 rounds	First took English Middleweight championship
Win	Tom Lowe	7 May 1844	Woking Common, England	43 rounds	
Win	Doc Campbell	12 June 1845		27 rounds	
Win	George Gutteridge	23 September 1846	South Farm Pastures, Bourne, England	93rd Round knockout, fought in (1:25:00)	Retained English Middleweight championship
Win	William Sparks	4 May 1847	Woking Common	67 Rounds	Sparsely publicized bout
Loss	Harry Orme	6 May 1851	Lower Hope Point, on the Thames River	117 Round knockout, fought in (2:59:00)	Only known career loss, Orme threw Langham repeatedly
Win	Tom Sayers	18 October 1853	Lakenheath, Suffolk, England	61st Round Knockout, fought in (2:02:00)	Retained Middleweight championship but retired
Draw	Ben Caunt	22 September 1857	Stanley Island, off River Medway, 10 miles from Chatham	60 Round draw, in (1:40:00)	Retired permanently after fight
