= Herbert Slade =

New Zealand boxer

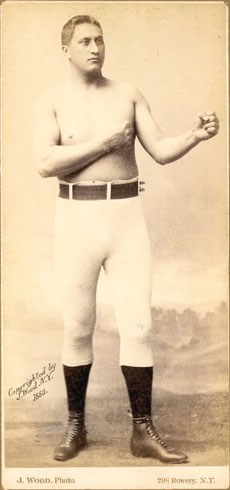
Herbert Slade

Herbert Augustus Slade (10 January 1851 – 6 April 1913), also known as "Maori" Slade, the Big Maori, the Maori Mauler or the Australian Giant, was a New Zealand boxer of Irish and Māori descent, who fought John L. Sullivan for the heavyweight championship of the world in 1883. This occurred at Madison Square Garden, New York, on 6 August 1883. Sullivan won in the third round. On 3 July 1896, long after his retirement, Slade was heavily beaten in a ten-round fight with Charley Lange. On other occasions, he reportedly had the better of Sullivan in saloon scuffles.

A bare-knuckle fighter, Slade is considered New Zealand’s first international sports personality, and has been inducted into the Māori Sports Hall of Fame.

Born at Kaikino, near Awanui in the Northland region of New Zealand, in 1851, he was one of eight children of James Slade, an Irish whaler, and Te Paea Rupu "Sophia" Kopiri, a Māori woman of the Ngāpuhi tribe.

Given the issues of racial discrimination in the United States, it was unusual for a brown person to be allowed to fight for the championship. Indeed, it was the first such match featuring a non-white contender.

Former champion boxer Jem Mace was Slade's discoverer and exhibition partner. Henry J. Rice was Slade's manager.

Slade later went on an exhibition tour across the United States with Sullivan. The press called Slade "one of the cleverest sparrers who ever entered a ring."

In 1886, Slade gave a sparring exhibition with Duncan McDonald at the Opera House in Salt Lake City, Utah to the benefit of the Olympic Club. Slade and McDonald were also arrested and taken to court for boxing. In 1887, both Slade and McDonald were found guilty of "prize fighting" and sentenced to 30 days in the state penitentiary. But as Slade and McDonald were well-liked citizens, the Governor immediately pardoned and released them.

While on a boxing exhibition tour and staying overnight at the Swasey Mansion in Mona, Utah, Slade accepted an engagement as the personal bodyguard of the wealthy rancher and bank owner Rodney Swasey. Slade lived on the Swasey ranch at the base of the Rocky Mountains in Mona, Utah. Slade and a cowboy, John W. Bascom, from the neighboring Bascom Ranch, gave sparring exhibitions in the area.

By 1891, Slade had retired from the boxing ring and was manager, director, boxing trainer and in house celebrity of Colonel Ed Kelley's Elks Gymnasium and Bijou Saloon in Salt Lake City. But there were rumors in the press and finally an announcement of Slade coming out of retirement to fight Charley Lange at the Elks gym. In June 1891, Slade gave a sparring exhibition in Provo, Utah with George LaBlanche and then prepared for a ten-round match with Lange in the Electric Light Hall in Salt Lake City.

Slade lost to Lange and then announced his retirement back to the ranch. Having second thoughts, Slade challenged Lange for a 25-round rematch in just six weeks. He again entered the ring in a ten-round glove fight in Logan with Jim Williams. Slade later became Williams personal trainer and helped him become the champion of Utah. Slade gave sparring exhibitions at Turner's Hall, the Electric Light Hall and other venues. Slade married his boss's daughter Estelle Armenta Swasey in 1892. Five children came from that union. Slade and his wife lived for a while in Salt Lake City where he opened a boxing school and also the mining town of Eureka, Utah where he was a boxing referee and started an athletic club. Slade was a referee in a boxing match held at the Provo Opera House in 1898. Slade was a part owner of the Last Chance gold mine in Little Cottonwood Canyon in the Wasatch Mountains east of Salt Lake City.

In 1909, Slade was appointed to serve as two-year term as Deputy Sheriff at Knight's Smelter in Tintic, Utah. Also that year, former world champion boxer John L. Sullivan, who had announced his final world tour of boxing, stopped at Slade's Eureka residence to convince him to join the tour.

Slade died in Mona, Utah in 1913 and is buried in the Mona Cemetery.
