= Bob Brettle =

Scottish boxer (1832–1872)

- Born: Robert Brettle; 18 January 1832; Portobello, Edinburgh
- Died: 7 April 1872 (aged 40); Birmingham
- Resting place: St. Peter's Church, Harborne
- Other name: The Birmingham Pet
- Known for: Boxing

Robert Brettle (1832–1872) was a successful bare-knuckle boxer active in Birmingham, England, during the 1850s. He was known as "The Birmingham Pet".

A silver belt, given to him by his patrons to honour his achievements, and made in Birmingham, was featured on the television programme Antiques Roadshow, while in the possession of one of his descendants. It was subsequently donated to the British Boxing Board of Control and is now displayed at their headquarters.

Brettle died aged 40 and is buried in the churchyard of St. Peter's Church, Harborne in Birmingham.

== Fights ==
- February 1854: James Malpas, for a purse of £50 in February 1854.
- November 1854: Jack Jones of Portsmouth, for £100.
- 1855: Defeated Roger Coyne, for £200, plus side bets.
- 1855: Defeated Sam Simmonds, for £200, plus side bets.
- 4 August 1857: Job Cobley, The Elastic Pot-Boy (47 rounds, 1 hour 37 minutes. £100 a side).
- 20 September 1859: Tom Sayers, British champion. Brettle retired with a dislocated shoulder in the 7th round.
