= Thomas King (boxer) =

English boxer

Personal information
- Nickname: The Sailor Boy
- Nationality: English
- Born: 14 August 1835 Stepney, East London, England
- Died: 3 October 1888 (aged 53) Clarence House, Clapham, London, England
- Height: 6 ft 2 in (1.88 m); Varies downward slightly in records
- Weight: 177 lb (80 kg), range 175–182 lb Heavyweight division in 1860s

Boxing career
- Stance: Orthodox

Boxing record
- Total fights: 7
- Wins: 6
- Losses: 1

Tom King (14 August 1835 – 3 October 1888) also known as "The Fighting Sailor" was an English boxer who fought both bare-knuckle and with gloves. Strong, fast, and durable he was a skilled pugilist. One of his quirkier pre-fight rituals was to drink a tot of gin before every bout. He retired from the ring in 1863, as the Heavyweight Champion of England, following his defeat of the reigning champion Jem Mace and American contender John C. Heenan.

== Early life ==
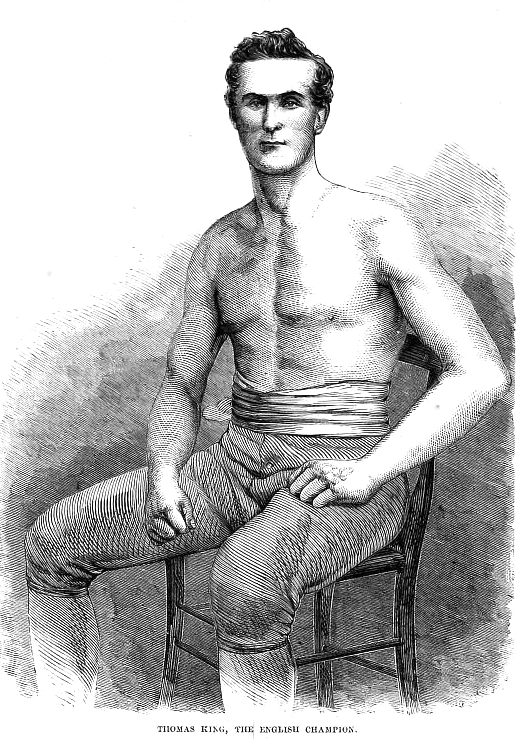
Drawing of King

King was born on Silver Street, Stepney, East London and at an early age joined the Royal Navy, journeying several times to the coast of Africa. While in the service he learned to box, both with and without gloves. Retiring from the navy while still a young man, he became a docker, rising to the position of foreman, where his skills with his fists earned him respect and some limited notoriety, following several brawls with colleagues.

== Boxing career ==
King's brawling bought him to the attention of the retired boxing champion Jem Ward who began to train him in earnest. During this period, prize-fighting was illegal in England, and likely to be broken up by the police with resulting arrests. Matches were arranged by word of mouth and often held at remote sites, the location being suddenly changed with little notice. The illegality of the sport did not stop spectators attending from a broad spectrum of society, from dockers to the highest echelons of the aristocracy.

King's first professional victory was over Bill Clamp, an accomplished dockyard fighter in 1859.

He then met Thomas Truckle around 28 November 1860 at the Kentish Marshes for a purse of £300 to be split. King had about a fifteen-pound weight and three inch height advantage. He took an early lead in the fighting and though the bout went 49 rounds before Truckle's seconds ended the contest, there was little doubt that King would prevail. King next had a 43-round victory over William Evans, known as Young Broome, on 21 October 1861 at two separate locations, Farnborough and Surrey. King's fourteen pound weight, and three inch height advantage led him to take a lead using his left in the 20th round when police broke up the bout, and when the match resumed in Surrey, King took a commanding lead in the fighting until Broome's seconds ended the bout in the 43rd round. Broome was later treated for internal injuries and a fracture to the principle bone of his left hand.

These victories led to his first attempt to attain the English heavyweight crown from Jem Mace on 28 January 1862 before a crowd of around 400. He trained carefully for his bouts with Young Broome and Mace under the tuteledge of boxer Nat Langham. His first title bout, staged in Godstone, England, was fought bare knuckle under London Prize Ring Rules and lasted for 43 rounds and 68 minutes. For the first 30 rounds King fought evenly with the reigning champion, but in the second half of the fight Mace took control, and despite being nearly blinded in both eyes, finished King with a crushing blow to the throat in the final round. In the 40th, Mace downed King with two uppercuts to the jaw, and fell upon him. In the 43rd Mace landed another uppercut to the jaw prior to several close in blows, and then threw King who collapsed and was unable to rise. Mace's most prominent injuries were to the left side of his face and eye.

=== English heavyweight champion, 1862 ===
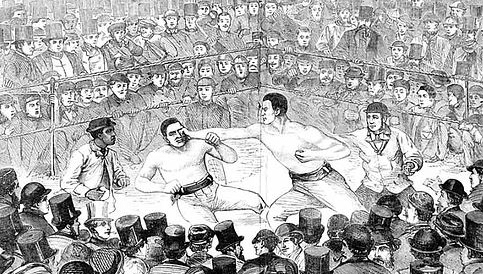
King shot a right to Mace's left eye in the 20th, causing a knockdown, Nov, 1862

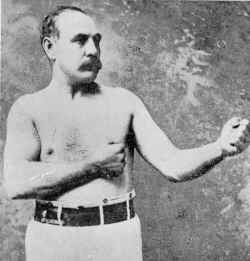
Jem Mace

Mace and King met on the banks of the River Medway, twenty-eight miles from London for a rematch less than a year later on 26 November 1862 for £200 a side. King was four years younger than Mace, roughly four inches taller, and approximately twenty pounds heavier. Mace seemed to dominate the infighting, though the pace of King's blows may have been faster, and he appeared to have won the thirteenth. In the opinion of several ringside reporters, Mace had a moderate lead up until the 20th round, when he landed a left to King's face. At this point, Mace still led the betting at 4–1. About to administer a similar blow, his foot slipped slightly and King administered a strong right under his eye on the left side of his nose, sending him to the ground and nearly causing a knockout. In the 21st, King administered the same blow with his right, knocking Mace to the grass, causing Mace's seconds to concede the match after 28 minutes of fighting. King took the heavyweight crown, and Mace and his seconds fully conceded the loss.

==== Defence of the championship ====
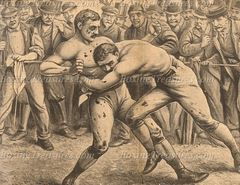
Heenan throwing King in the 6th

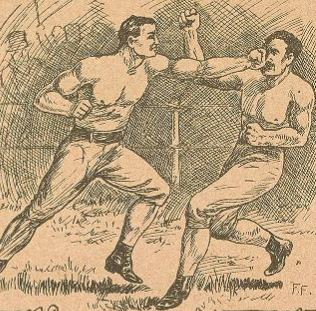
King striking Heenan in the final rounds

King's next fight was a defence of the English heavyweight championship and took place on a sunny morning at 10 am on 10 December 1863 for the exceptional sum of £1000 a side against John C Heenan. Heenan was an American who had fought the British boxer Thomas Sayers to a controversial draw for the heavyweight title in 1860. Heenan had been unofficially acclaimed the heavyweight champion, so King and his seconds knew the importance of taking the bout to defend the title. Thomas Sayers acted as Heenan's second, appearing in a boxing ring for the last time before his early death in 1865. The bout was held at Cockmounts Farm, Wadhurst, East Sussex and was fought with bare-knuckles using London Prize Ring Rules. According to Heenan's 19th-century biographer, the fight lasted 35 minutes and 25 rounds. In the first round, Heenan put King in a headlock and beat his head with his opposite hand until forced to stop from the blows administered by King on his back. Called "fibbing" at the time, holding an opponent by the neck and striking him was a move usually allowed under London Prize Ring Rules. In the second, Heenan again tried to hug and strike King but with less success, so he threw King to the ground. Heenan attempted a hold again in the third and threw King into the ropes, throwing him to the ground with force in the sixth. In the sixteenth, King was again dashed to the ground, thrown by Heenan. For the first 17 rounds the fighting appeared close with a lead by Heenan, but in the 18th round King seemed to gain the advantage with blows to Heenan's face, and went on to win the match. King dominated the last three rounds, and Heenan's face was pummeled brutally, showing considerable injury. In the 23rd, King downed Heenan with a right. Heenan came to scratch in the 24th, but was downed again near his corner by King, curling up in a heap. He was unable to answer in the 25th and when his second "threw up the sponge", the fight was called. Heenan received dreadful injuries to his face, and several reporters present at the fight felt it should have been called in the 21st.

King now became very selective of his opponents refusing to meet Mace in the ring again. Mace was frustrated and angry at not being given the opportunity to regain his heavyweight title, and in order to prompt a match deliberately set out to pick a fight with King in the street. King still refused to fight him and retired allowing the heavyweight title to fall vacant, though subsequently many unofficially claimed it.

== Retirement ==
Having acquired and defended the heavyweight title, King turned to other sources of income.

He found recognition as a rower or sculler, defeating Tom May of Lambeth around 1864, and James Percy of Newcastle-on-Tyne. He met his first defeat in February 1865, against the rower Caffin after a foul was called by the referee and the race was run a second time. After his loss, he withdrew from the sport. Unlike many of his contemporaries who relied on the charity and munificence of their former patrons and fans for support, King prospered as a bookmaker, primarily at horse tracks, often as an agent for Lord Hastings. It is believed he once made £4000 as a commission agent betting on the horse Melton at the Liverpool Autumn Cup in 1886, retiring from bookmaking not long after. With his acquired wealth and notoriety, at least one championship horse was named in his honor. During his boxing retirement, he married the daughter of a wealthy ship owner.

He died on 4 October 1888 of bronchitis at his home in Clarence House, Clapham, London at the age of 53. He left a wife, Jane, and married daughter Emily Standridge. With the dowry of his wealthy wife and her estate, his personal estate was assessed at £54,472 at the time of his death, a fortune of over £4 million in today's currency. He is buried at London's old and historically significant West Norwood Cemetery. He was inducted into the Ring Boxing Hall of Fame in 1977 and the International Boxing Hall of Fame in 1992.

== Selected fights ==
6 Wins, 1 Loss
Result	Opponent(s)	Date	Location	Duration	Notes
Win	Bill Clamp	1859	-	1 round	Clamp was a fellow docker
Win	Brighton Bill	1860	Plaistow Marshes, England	1 round	
Win	Tom Truckle	27 November 1860	Kentish Marshes, England	49 rounds, 62 minutes	
Win	Young Broome	21 October 1861	Farnborough, then Surrey, England	43 rounds, 42 minutes	Held in two locations on the same date Police intervened at the first location
Loss	Jem Mace	28 January 1862	Godstone, England	23 rounds, 68 minutes	Attempted English Heavyweight Championship
Win	Jem Mace	26 November 1862	Medway, England	21 rounds, 38 minutes	Won English Championship
Win	John C. Heenan	10 December 1863	Wadhurst, England	24 rounds, 35 minutes	Retained English Championship

== See also ==
- List of bare-knuckle boxers
