= Harry Orme =

English bare-knuckle boxer

Orme in 1853, section from flyer promoting his match with Nat Langham

Harry Orme (May 1826-9 June 1864) was a boxer from the bare-knuckle fighting era who was a candidate for heavyweight champion of England in the mid 19th century.

== Early life ==
Harry Orme was born near Bow near the East End of London in May 1826.

== Boxing career ==
Amongst other bouts, Orme fought and beat Nat Langham on the 6 May 1851, this being Langham's only career loss. Orme fought a championship bout against Harry Broome on 18 April 1853.

== After retirement ==
Orme kept the pub Jane Shore in Shoreditch for many years until his death on 6 June 1864.
