= Charley Mitchell (boxer) =

British boxer

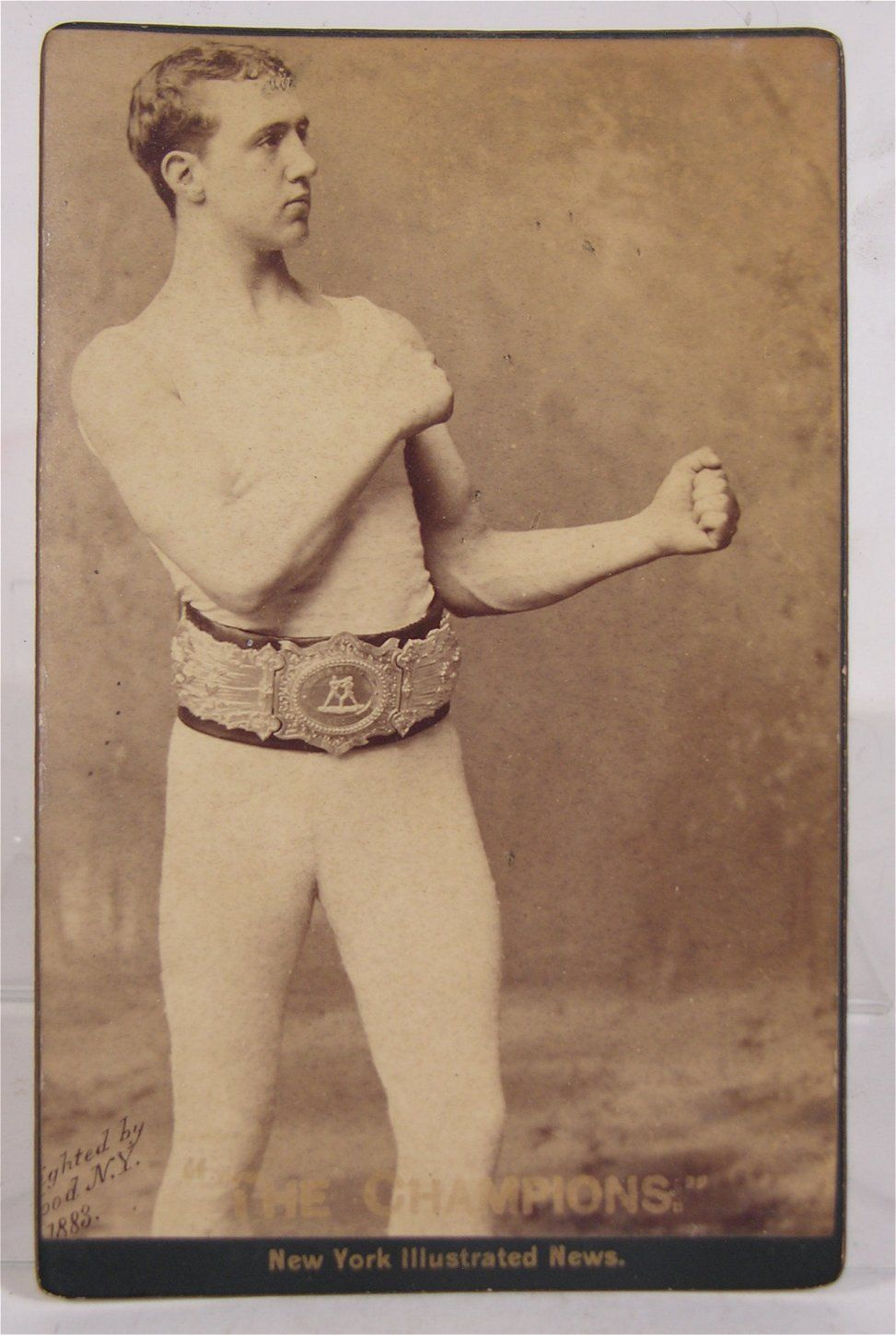

Personal information
- Nationality: England
- Born: Charles Watson Mitchell; 24 November 1861 Birmingham, England
- Died: 3 April 1918 (aged 56) Hove, East Sussex, England

Boxing career

Charles Watson Mitchell (24 November 1861 – 3 April 1918) was an English world heavyweight boxing title contender and lightweight champion.

== Professional career ==
Mitchell was born on 24 November 1861 in the city of Birmingham, England. Mitchell had exceptional ability at using London Prize Ring Rules to his advantage. During his career, he engaged in over 100 fights with both gloves and bare-knuckles, using the London Prize Ring Rules as well as the Queensberry Rules. He often fought men who outweighed him by 30 to 40 pounds. Mitchell took on all comers in London, often fighting as many as four bouts in one night.

In 1880 he became the boxing instructor for the International Athletic Club at the "White Rose" in London, and opened a boxing school at the "Palais Rubens" in Antwerp, Belgium.

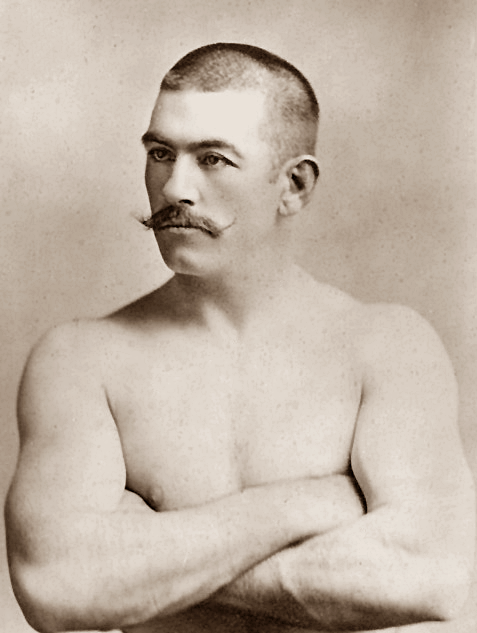
John L. Sullivan.

In 1882 Billy Madden, the former tutor and backer of John L. Sullivan, put on an openweight boxing tournament in England, in order to find a challenger for John L. Sullivan. This was a professional tournament, held under amateur rules, consisting of 3 3 minute rounds, with an extra 2 minute round being fought in the case of draws, A number of prominent boxers including Jem Goode and Jack Knifton entered. Despite being both the youngest and lightest of the 21 competitors, Mitchell won the tournament.

Mitchell toured the United States and Canada with Jake Kilrain, and later Frank "Paddy" Slavin, putting on exhibitions, sometimes daily and sometimes on the same day as one of his fights. Mitchell was in Kilrain's corner on 8 July 1889 when he fought John L. Sullivan for the world heavyweight boxing championship.

Mitchell fought John L. Sullivan in 1883, knocking him down in the first round before the police halted the contest in the third round. Their second meeting took place in 1888 on the grounds of a chateau at Chantilly, France in driving rain. It went on for more than two hours, at the end of which both men were unrecognisable and had suffered much loss of blood; neither could lift his arms to punch and the contest was considered a draw.

The local gendarmerie arrived at this point and managed to arrest Mitchell, who spent the next few days in a cell and was later fined by the local magistrate, boxing being illegal in France at that time. Sullivan managed to evade the law, swathed in bandages, and was taken back across the English Channel to spend the next few weeks convalescing in Liverpool. Mitchell acted as Sullivan's corner man for many years after.

In 1894 Mitchell fought in his most noteworthy bout, against James J Corbett for the world heavyweight championship. Corbett won by KO in the 3rd round, winning $20,000.

== Death ==
Mitchell died on 3 April 1918 in Hove at age 56.

== Honors ==
Mitchell was inducted into the Ring Magazine's Boxing Hall of Fame in 1957, and inducted into the International Boxing Hall of Fame (2002).

== Professional boxing record ==
50 fights	26 wins	3 losses
By knockout	9	2
By decision	17	1
Draws	11	
No contests	10	

No.	Result	Record	Opponent	Type	Round, time	Date	Location	Notes
50	ND	26–3–11 (10)	Steve O'Donnell	ND	3	May 25, 1896	Putney, London, England, UK	
49	Loss	26–3–11 (9)	James J. Corbett	KO	3 (?)	Jan 25, 1894	Duvall Athletic Club, Jacksonville, Florida, US	For world heavyweight title
48	ND	26–2–11 (9)	Jim Hall	ND	3	Oct 4, 1893	People"s Theatre, Chicago, Illinois, US	
47	ND	26–2–11 (8)	Jim Hall	ND	3	Sep 29, 1893	Clermont Avenue Rink, New York City, New York, US	
46	ND	26–2–11 (7)	Frank Slavin	ND	3	Mar 7, 1892	Buffalo A.C., Buffalo, New York, US	
45	Win	26–2–11 (6)	Arthur Upham	PTS	4	Mar 2, 1892	Olympic Club, New Orleans, Louisiana, US	Second fight in one day
44	ND	25–2–11 (6)	Frank Slavin	ND	4	Mar 2, 1892	Olympic Club, New Orleans, Louisiana, US	
43	ND	25–2–11 (5)	Frank Slavin	ND	3	Apr 30, 1891	New York City, New York, US	
42	ND	25–2–11 (4)	Frank Slavin	ND	3	Apr 9, 1891	Liverpool, Merseyside, England, UK	
41	Win	25–2–11 (3)	Jem Mace	PTS	4	Feb 7, 1890	Gaiety Theatre, Glasgow, Scotland, UK	
40	Draw	24–2–11 (3)	John L. Sullivan	PTS	39	Feb 10, 1889	Chantilly, Oise, France	For world bare-knuckle heavyweight boxing title; London Prize Ring Rules
39	Win	24–2–10 (3)	Reddy Gallagher	PTS	6	Aug 28, 1887	Frankfort St. Gym, Cleveland, Ohio, US	
38	Draw	23–2–10 (3)	Patsy Cardiff	PTS	5	Jun 11, 1887	Washington Roller Rink, Minneapolis, Minnesota, US	There were two referees, Masterson for Mitchell, and Hank Seeley for Cardiff, each pronounced his man the victor at the end
37	Draw	23–2–9 (3)	Jack Burke	PTS	10 (8)	May 10, 1886	Battery D Armory, Chicago, Illinois, US	Two extra rounds ordered by the referee
36	Draw	23–2–8 (3)	Jack Burke	PTS	6	Jun 29, 1885	Battery D Armory, Chicago, Illinois, US	
35	Draw	23–2–7 (3)	Mike Cleary	PTS	4	May 22, 1885	Pavilion, San Francisco, California, US	
34	Win	23–2–6 (3)	John Scholes	PTS	4	Feb 23, 1885	Mutual Street Rink, Toronto, Ontario, Canada	
33	Win	22–2–6 (3)	Jim Brady	KO	3 (?)	Dec, 1884	Buffalo, New York, US	Exact date unknown
32	ND	21–2–6 (3)	Jack Burke	NC	3 (8)	Nov 24, 1884	Madison Square Garden, New York City, New York, US	
31	Draw	21–2–6 (2)	Jack Burke	PTS	4	Oct 21, 1884	Germania Assembly Rooms, New York City, New York, US	
30	Loss	21–2–5 (2)	Dominick McCaffrey	PTS	4	Oct 13, 1884	Madison Square Garden, New York City, New York, US	
29	Win	21–1–5 (2)	Billy Edwards	KO	3 (?)	May 12, 1884	New York City, New York, US	Police stopped the fight
28	Draw	20–1–5 (2)	Jake Kilrain	PTS	4	Mar 26, 1884	Institute Hall, Boston, Massachusetts, US	
27	Win	20–1–4 (2)	Joe Denning	PTS	4	Mar 20, 1884	New York City, New York, US	
26	Win	19–1–4 (2)	Tug Wilson	KO	3 (?)	Nov 15, 1883	Manchester, Lancashire, UK	
25	Draw	18–1–4 (2)	William Sherriff	PTS	7 (6)	Oct 2, 1883	Flushing, Queens, New York City, New York, US	Referee first declared Mitchell the winner, another round was fought and the fight was called a draw
24	Draw	18–1–3 (2)	Herbert Maori Slade	PTS	3	Oct, 1883	Harry Hills, Long Island, New York, US	
23	Win	18–1–2 (2)	Herbert Maori Slade	KO	?	Sep 18, 1883	New York City, New York, US	
22	ND	17–1–2 (2)	Billy Lynn	ND	4	Jul 8, 1883	Leadville, Colorado, US	
21	ND	17–1–2 (1)	Denis Ike Hayes	ND	4	Jul 6, 1883	Leadville, Colorado, US	
20	Win	17–1–2	Davis	KO	1 (?)	Jul, 1883	Leadville, Colorado, US	
19	Win	16–1–2	Garrett	KO	1 (?)	Jun, 1883	Syracuse, New York, US	
18	Loss	15–1–2	John L. Sullivan	TKO	3 (?)	May 14, 1883	Madison Square Garden, New York City, New York, US	
17	Win	15–0–2	Mike Cleary	TKO	3 (?)	Apr 9, 1883	American Institute Rink, New York City, New York, US	Police stopped the fight
16	Win	14–0–2	Jack Clarke	TKO	1 (?)	Feb 17, 1883	Newcastle, Tyne and Wear, England, UK	
15	Win	13–0–2	Joe Stubbins	PTS	3	Dec 23, 1882	St. George's Hall, London, England, UK	Third fight in one day
14	Win	12–0–2	W. Heal	PTS	3	Dec 23, 1882	St. George's Hall, London, England, UK	Second fight in one day
13	Win	11–0–2	Dick Roberts	PTS	3	Dec 23, 1882	St. George's Hall, London, England, UK	
12	Win	10–0–2	Bill Springhall	PTS	3	Dec 22, 1882	King's Road Baths, London, England, UK	
11	Win	9–0–2	Bill England	PTS	3	Dec 21, 1882	King's Road Baths, London, England, UK	Second fight in one day
10	Win	8–0–2	George Cox	PTS	3	Dec 21, 1882	King's Road Baths, London, England, UK	
9	Win	7–0–2	Roger Wallis	PTS	?	May, 1882	Exact location unknown, UK	
8	Win	6–0–2	Bill Harnetty	PTS	4	Apr 3, 1882	King's Road Baths, London, England, UK	
7	Win	5–0–2	Pat Condon	PTS	3	Mar 29, 1882	King's Road Baths, London, England, UK	
6	Draw	4–0–2	Tom Tully	PTS	6	May 16, 1881	Exact location unknown, UK	
5	Win	4–0–1	W. Caradoff	PTS	4	Feb 1, 1881	Antwerpen, Belgium	
4	Draw	3–0–1	Young Bill Kennedy	PTS	?	Jan, 1879	Exact location unknown, UK	Exact date unknown
3	Win	3–0	Chelsea Pride	KO	2 (?)	Mar, 1877	Exact location unknown, UK	Exact date unknown
2	Win	2–0	Hutchinson	PTS	?	Feb, 1877	Exact location unknown, UK	Exact date unknown
1	Win	1–0	Andy Gray	PTS	?	Jan, 1877	Exact location unknown, UK	Exact date unknown
