= Bare Knuckle Boxing Hall of Fame =

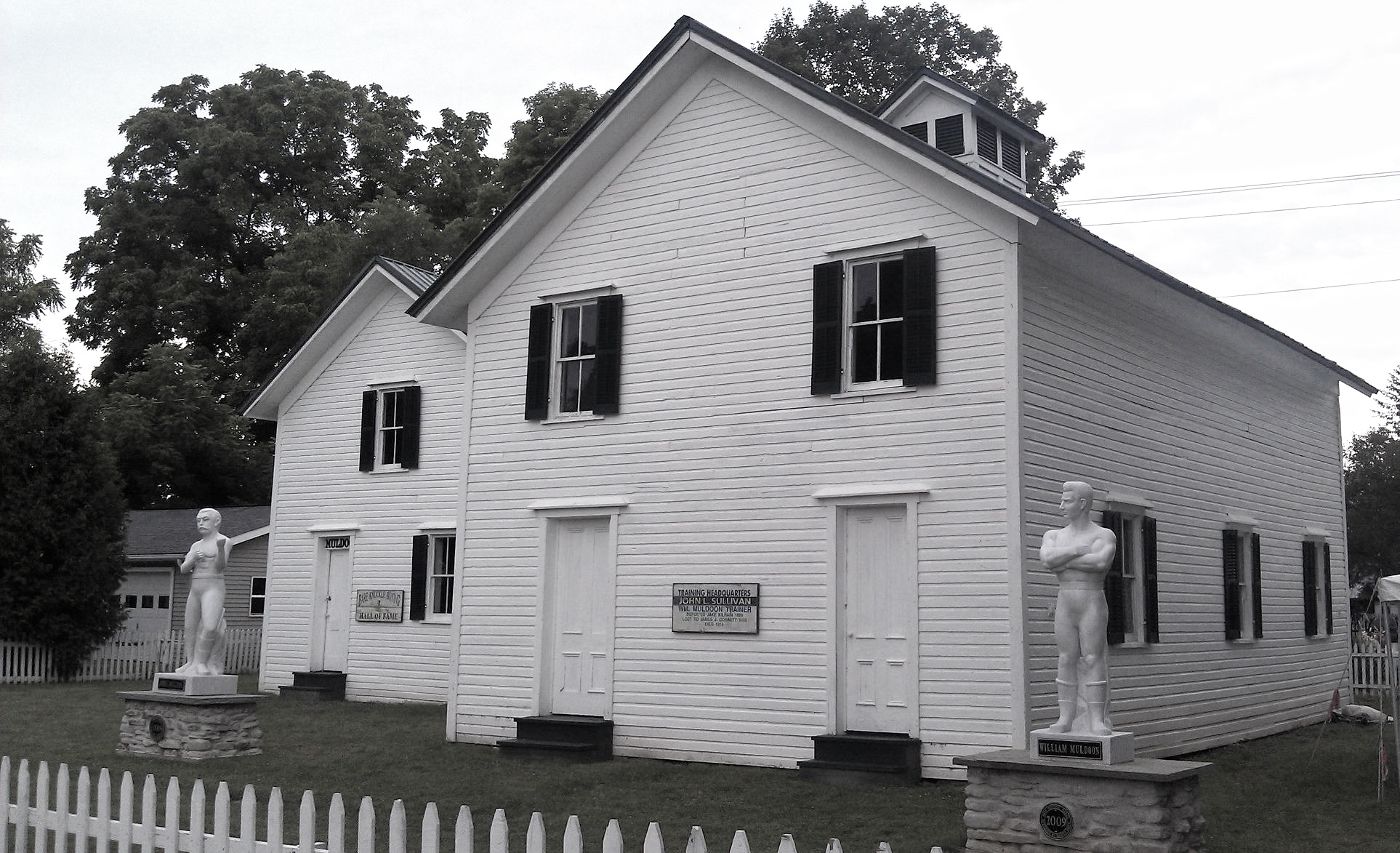
- Established: 2009
- Location: Belfast, New York
- Coordinates: 42.343392°N 78.112682°W
- Type: Hall of Fame
- Founder: Scott Burt
- Owner: Scott Burt
- Website: www.bkbhof.com

The Bare Knuckle Boxing Hall of Fame is a museum and hall of fame in Belfast, New York, dedicated to the sport of bare-knuckle boxing. It is housed in barns that were once owned by the Greco-Roman wrestling champion and physical culture pioneer William Muldoon. The heavyweight boxing champion John L. Sullivan, who fought in both bare-knuckled and gloved boxing contests, trained in these barns under Muldoon's guidance for his championship bout against Jake Kilrain in 1889. The barns were originally across Main Street from their current location, on the grounds of the Belfast Catholic Church. They were bought, moved, and restored by Scott Burt when the church became no longer interested in maintaining them. Burt opened the Hall of Fame in 2009, when it had its first induction class.

The Hall of Fame houses plaques and memorabilia associated with bare-knuckle boxers that have been inducted to the Hall of Fame, as well as exhibits devoted to the general history of bare-knuckle boxing. Each year's induction class includes bare-knuckle boxers from the classic era, modern bare-knuckle boxers, and honorary inductees. Trainers, promoters and other significant figures in the sport are also upon occasion inducted.

The Hall of Fame also serves as a memorial to Sullivan's training camp with Muldoon, a number of relics of which have survived the lengthy period when the barns sat unused. These include his original work-out rings, a ceiling mount for Sullivan's heavy bag, the slatted area of flooring on which Sullivan stood for gravity showers after training, his original swing clubs and weights, and the "room of repose" in which Sullivan and Muldoon relaxed and discussed strategy in the evenings, which includes some of Muldoon's original furniture. Sullivan and Muldoon's use of this training camp was documented by the celebrated reporter Nellie Bly, in an article she wrote for the New York World.

== Inductees ==
The following are the inductees into the Bare Knuckle Boxing Hall of Fame as of 6 April 2018:

=== Original inductees ===
Original inductees are required to have boxed completely bare-fisted (with no wraps) at some point in their career. These include living fighters and those that fought as early as the 18th century.

Year	Inductees	Role	Nationality
2009	Jack Broughton	Boxer	England
2009	Bill Richmond	Boxer	United States; England
2009	Tom Cribb	Boxer	England
2009	Tom Hyer	Boxer	United States
2009	Paddy Ryan	Boxer	Ireland; United States
2009	George Godfrey	Boxer	Canada
2009	Jake Kilrain	Boxer	United States
2009	John L. Sullivan	Boxer	United States
2009	William Muldoon	Trainer	United States
2009	Richard K. Fox	Promoter	Ireland; United States
2010	James Figg	Boxer	England
2010	Tom Molineaux	Boxer	United States
2010	Tom Spring	Boxer	England
2010	John C. Heenan	Boxer	United States
2010	Tom Sayers	Boxer	England
2010	Jem Mace	Boxer	England
2010	Jem Smith	Boxer	England
2010	Jack "Nonpareil" Dempsey	Boxer	Ireland; United States
2010	Jack McAuliffe	Boxer	Ireland; United States
2010	Billy Madden	Manager	Ireland; England; United States
2010	Harry H. Hill	Promoter	England; United States
2011	Jack Randall	Boxer	Ireland; United States
2011	Dan Donnelly	Boxer	Ireland
2011	William Thompson	Boxer	England
2012	Charley Mitchell	Boxer	England
2012	James Belcher	Boxer	England
2012	Hen Pearce	Boxer	England
2013	Mike Cleary	Boxer	Ireland; United States
2013	Bob Fitzsimmons	Boxer	England; New Zealand
2013	Peter Jackson	Boxer	Denmark; United States Virgin Islands; Australia
2014	Elizabeth Wilkinson	Boxer	England
2014	Hattie Stewart	Boxer	United States
2014	Hattie Leslie	Boxer	United States
2014	Anna Lewis	Boxer	United States
2014	Alice Leary	Boxer	United States
2015	John Gully	Boxer	England
2015	Professor Mike Donovan	Boxer	United States
2015	Bobby Gunn	Boxer	Canada
2016	Arthur Chambers	Boxer	England; United States
2016	Larry Foley	Boxer	Australia
2016	Danny Batchelder	Boxer	United States
2016	James Quinn McDonagh	Boxer; Author; Knuckle (film)	Ireland
2016	Kimbo Slice	Boxer; Street fighter	Bahamas; United States
2016	Police Gazette	Publication	United States
2017	Uriah "Hughie" Burton	Boxer	Ireland; England
2017	Ted Daley	Boxer	
2017	Billy Edwards	Boxer	England
2017	Bartley Gorman V	Boxer	England; Ireland; Wales
2017	Daniel Mendoza	Boxer	England
2018	Mike Conley	Boxer	United States
2018	Tom Johnson	Boxer	England
2018	Nat Langham	Boxer	England
2018	Joe Lannon	Boxer	Canada

=== Honorary inductees ===
These must have brought positive spotlight to upstate New York or done a considerable service to the sport of Bare-knuckle boxing. Honorary inductees are those that have not bare knuckle boxed, that is, those listed as a 'boxer' have boxed with gloves or wraps, and inductees associated with ice hockey are inducted for their contributions to the fighting aspects of the game (to date, both hockey-related honorary inductees have been associated with the Buffalo Sabres, who play 66 miles (106 km) from Belfast). The honorary inductees were included as an acknowledgement that bare-knuckle boxing ended as a mainstream sport over a century ago, and that the honorary inductee system allows notable figures that promoted activity similar to bare knuckle boxing, who might be more recognizable to modern audiences, to be included in the Hall.

Year	Inductee	Role	Nationality
2009	Carmen Basilio	Boxer	United States
2009	Rob Ray	Hockey enforcer	Canada
2009	Baby Joe Mesi	Boxer	United States
2009	Bill Heaney	Promoter	United States
2010	Billy Backus	Boxer	United States
2011	Livingstone Bramble	Boxer	Saint Kitts and Nevis; United States Virgin Islands
2011	Dick Wipperman	Boxer	United States
2011	Jimmy Ralston	Boxer	United States
2012	Ben Becker	Coach; Trainer (to Muhammad Ali before the 1960 Summer Olympics)	United States
2012	Tony Graziano	Trainer (of Billy Backus in the 1970s)	United States
2012	Juan de Leon	Trainer (Team Mesi)	
2012	Carlos de Leon	Trainer (Team Mesi)	
2012	Angel de Leon	Trainer (Team Mesi)	
2012	Chuck Pelitera	Trainer (Team Mesi)	
2012	Johnny Sudac Jr.	Trainer; Gym Owner	United States
2012	Michael Tome	Gym Owner	United States
2013	Carlos Ortiz	Boxer	Puerto Rico
2013	Tommy Hicks	Boxer	United States
2013	George "Elbows" McFadden	Boxer	United States
2013	Hite Peckham	Boxer	United States
2014	Nellie Bly	Reporter	United States
2014	Melvina Lathan	NYSAC Commissioner	United States
2014	Gloria Peek	Trainer	United States
2014	Leona Brown	Boxer	United States
2014	Christy Martin	Boxer	United States
2015	Jack Green Jr.	Promoter of the sport	
2015	Johnny Green	Boxer	United States
2015	Howard Cosell	Commentator	United States
2015	Bert Sugar	Historian	United States
2015	Don Dunphy	Commentator	United States
2015	Al Bernstein	Commentator	United States
2015	Cus D'Amato	Trainer	United States
2015	Charles Murray	Boxer	United States
2015	Purple Heart Homes	Charity	United States
2016	James J. Corbett	Boxer	United States
2016	Ring Magazine	Publication	United States
2016	Boxing News Magazine	Publication	United Kingdom
2016	The USA Boxing News	Publication	United States
2017	Ed Atherton	Wrestler	United States
2017	Barry Broughton	Grandmaster	
2017	Chris Guzman	Artist	
2017	Roy Harding	Boxer	United States
2017	Jimmy Holmes	Boxer	United States
2017	Tim Witherspoon	Boxer	United States
2018	Rick Jeanneret	Hockey announcer (inducted for his blow-by-blow on in-game fights)	Canada
2018	Tony Gee	Historian	England
2018	Dick Topinko	Boxer	United States

=== Marie Backus Person of the Year ===
Year	Recipient
2014	Mercedes Vazquez-Simmons
2015	Jack Emrick
2016	Bob Collins
2017	Gino Arilotta
2018	Bill Clancy

== Induction events ==
For the inaugural induction ceremony in 2009, former undisputed heavyweight champion Leon Spinks was a special guest.

From 2011 to 2013 there was a breakfast in honour of a particular person each year, and in 2011 this was Jack Green, Buffalo Ring 44 President. In 2012 the breakfast was in honour of Jeff Mengel, who had trained the fighter Jimmy Holmes in the barns in Belfast, New York. The 2013 breakfast was in honour of Zeke Wilson, author of the book The Eighth Round, combatant of prejudice in boxing and a noted boxer himself.

== Current recognized champions ==
With the introduction of modern-day sanctioned bare knuckle boxing events both inside and outside of the United States, the Bare Knuckle Boxing Hall of Fame, in conjunction with the National Police Gazette, currently recognizes several individuals as World and American Bare Knuckle Boxing champions. The following individuals are recognized as the current champions.

Division	Champion
Heavyweight World Champion	(United States) Joey Beltran
Heavyweight American Champion	(United States) Chase Sherman
Lightweight American Champion	(United States) Johnny Bedford
Women's Featherweight World Champion	(Australia) Bec Rawlings
Women's Featherweight American Champion	(United States) Helen Peralta

== Modern era championship history ==
=== National Police Gazette Heavyweight World Championship ===
Weight limit: 265 lbs (120 kg)
Bobby Gunn was recognized as the Bare Knuckle Boxing lineal champion after his victory over Richie Steward in 2011. Sometime after this victory, Gunn was awarded the National Police Gazette Championship by the Bare Knuckle Boxing Hall of Fame. He then cemented his lineal championship status as he defeated Irineu Beato Costa Jr at BKFC 1 in 2018 which did not appear to be a Police Gazette Championship title defense.

No.	Name	Event	Date	Defenses
1	(Canada) Bobby Gunn promoted to undisputed champion	N/A	February, 2016	
The title was vacated on Nov 11, 2019 as Bobby Gunn was named Police Gazette Champion Emeritus, meaning he can challenge for the World title whenever he wants
2	(United States) Joey Beltran def. Chase Sherman	Bare Knuckle Fighting Championship 9 Biloxi, Mississippi	November 16, 2019	1. def. Marcel Stamps at BKFC 13 on Oct 10, 2020; 2. def. Sam Shewmaker at BKFC 18 on June 26, 2021
3	(United States) Arnold Adams	Bare Knuckle Fighting Championship Fight Night: New York; Salamanca, New York	November 6, 2021	
The title was vacated for unknown reasons
4	(United States) Gustavo Trujillo def. Ike Villanueva	BYB 28: Bourbon Street Brawl; New Orleans, Louisiana	July 13, 2024	

=== National Police Gazette Heavyweight American Championship ===
Weight limit: 265 lbs (120 kg)
Arnold Adams claimed this championship by winning an 8-man tournament which was hosted by Bare Knuckle Fighting Championship.

No.	Name	Event	Date	Defenses
1	(United States) Arnold Adams def. Sam Shewmaker	Bare Knuckle Fighting Championship 3 Biloxi, Mississippi	October 20, 2018	
2	(United States) Chase Sherman	Bare Knuckle Fighting Championship 7 Biloxi, Mississippi	August 10, 2019	
The title was vacated as Chase Sherman fought for the World Championship against Joey Beltran

=== National Police Gazette UK Heavyweight Championship ===
Weight limit: 265 lbs (120 kg)

No.	Name	Event	Date	Defenses
1	(England) Jody Meikle def. Dorian Darch	BKB 24; London, UK	January 22, 2022	
2	(England) Dan Podmore	BKB 26; London, UK	June 11, 2022	

=== National Police Gazette 225-lb UK Championship ===
Weight limit: 225 lbs (102 kg)

No.	Name	Event	Date	Defenses
1	(England) Dan Podmore def. Ryan Barrett	BKB 28; London, UK	September 3, 2022	

=== National Police Gazette Cruiserweight World Championship ===
Weight limit: 205 lbs (93 kg)

No.	Name	Event	Date	Defenses
1	(United States) Lorenzo Hunt def. Héctor Lombard	Bare Knuckle Fighting Championship 22; Miami, Florida	November 12, 2021	
The title was vacated on July 13, 2022 for unknown reasons
2	(Croatia) Marko Martinjak def. Chad Kelly	BKB 29; London, England	December 3, 2022	
3	(United States) Jarome Hatch	BYB 16: Desert Brawl; Dubai, United Arab Emirates	March 18, 2023	
4	(Croatia) Marko Martinjak	BKB 18: The Police Gazette International Cup; London, England	June 25, 2023	1. def. Jarome Hatch at BYB 23 on January 18, 2024

=== National Police Gazette 205-lb British Championship ===
Weight limit: 205 lbs (93 kg)

No.	Name	Event	Date	Defenses
1	(United Kingdom) Dave Thomas def. Steve Evans	BKB 27; London, UK	July 23, 2022	

=== National Police Gazette 185-lb World Championship ===
Weight limit: 185 lbs (84 kg)

No.	Name	Event	Date	Defenses
1	(United States) Cub Hawkins def. Daniel Lerwell	BYB 23: Brawl in the Pines 2 Pembroke Pines, Florida	January 18, 2024	

=== National Police Gazette 185-lb British Championship ===
Weight limit: 185 lbs (84 kg)

No.	Name	Event	Date	Defenses
1	(England) Marley Churcher def. Gavin Curragh	BKB 27; London, UK	July 23, 2022	
2	(United Kingdom) James Connelly	BKB 31; London, England	March 26, 2023	

=== National Police Gazette 175-lb World Championship ===
Weight limit: 175 lbs (79 kg)

No.	Name	Event	Date	Defenses
1	(Wales) Barrie Jones def. Jimmy Sweeney	BKB 25; London, UK	April 10, 2022	1. def. Jimmy Sweeney at BKB 28 on September 3, 2022; 2. def. Jonny Tello at BKB 30 on January 21, 2023 3. def. Tommy Turner at BYB 18 on June 25, 2023
2	(United States) Lowrant-T Nelson	BYB 30: Cardiff Brawl; Cardiff, Wales	August 17, 2024	

=== National Police Gazette 175-lb British Championship ===
Weight limit: 175 lbs (79 kg)

No.	Name	Event	Date	Defenses
1	(United Kingdom) Tony Lafferty def. Reece Murray	BKB 29; London, England	December 3, 2022	

=== National Police Gazette 165-lb World Championship ===
Weight limit: 165 lbs (74 kg)

No.	Name	Event	Date	Defenses
1	(Puerto Rico) Elvin Leon Brito def. Kaleb Harris	Bare Knuckle Fighting Championship Fight Night: Jackson; Jackson, Mississippi	January 29, 2022	

=== National Police Gazette 165-lb British Championship ===
Weight limit: 165 lbs (74 kg)

No.	Name	Event	Date	Defenses
1	(United Kingdom) Sean George def. Tony Lafferty	BKB 25; London, UK	April 10, 2022	
2	(England) Scott McHugh	BKB 26; London, UK	June 11, 2022	1. def. Martin Reffell at BKB 28 on September 3, 2022

=== National Police Gazette 155-lb World Championship ===
Weight limit: 155 lbs (70 kg)

No.	Name	Event	Date	Defenses
1	(Peru) Luis Palomino def. Jim Alers	Bare Knuckle Fighting Championship 14; Miami, Florida	November 13, 2020	1. def. Tyler Goodjohn at BKFC 18 on June 26, 20212. def. Dat Nguyen at BKFC 22 on November 12, 20213. def. Martin Brown at BKFC: KnuckleMania 2 on February 19, 2022
The title was vacated on November 14, 2022 for unknown reasons
2	(United States) Desmond Green def. Scott McHugh	BYB 13: Tampa Brawl; Tampa, Florida	November 19, 2022	

=== National Police Gazette 145-lb World Championship ===
Weight limit: 145 lbs (65 kg)

No.	Name	Event	Date	Defenses
1	(United States) Seth Shaffer def. Carlos Guerra	BYB 12: London Brawl; London, England	October 16, 2022	

=== National Police Gazette 135-lb World Championship ===
Weight limit: 135 lbs (61 kg)

No.	Name	Event	Date	Defenses
1	(United States) Dat Nguyen def. Johnny Bedford	Bare Knuckle Fighting Championship: Knucklemania; Lakeland, Florida	February 5, 2021	
The title was vacated on June 10, 2021 for unknown reasons
2	(United States) Johnny Bedford def. Reggie Barnett Jr.	Bare Knuckle Fighting Championship 20; Biloxi, Mississippi	August 20, 2021	
The title was vacated on December 21, 2022 as Johnny Bedford retired from combat sports

=== National Police Gazette Lightweight American Championship ===
Weight limit: 135 lbs (61 kg)
Johnny Bedford claimed this championship by winning an 8-man tournament which was hosted by Bare Knuckle Fighting Championship.

No.	Name	Event	Date	Defenses
1	(United States) Johnny Bedford def. Reggie Barnett Jr.	Bare Knuckle Fighting Championship 6 Tampa, Florida	June 22, 2019	
The title was changed to World Championship

=== National Police Gazette British Championship ===
No.	Name	Event	Date	Defenses
1	(England) Matt Hodgson def. Lawrence Tracey	BKB 24; London, UK	January 22, 2022	

=== National Police Gazette Women's 155-lb World Championship ===
Weight limit: 155 lbs (70 kg)

No.	Name	Event	Date	Defenses
1	(United States) Jozette Cotton def. Miranda Barber	BYB 12: London Brawl; London, England	October 16, 2022	1. def. Jamie Driver at BYB 17 on May 13, 2023

=== National Police Gazette Women's 135-lb World Championship ===
Weight limit: 135 lbs (61 kg)

No.	Name	Event	Date	Defenses
1	(United States) Patricia Juarez def. Monica Medina	BYB X: Biloxi Brawl; Biloxi, Mississippi	January 22, 2022	
2	(United States) Monica Medina	BYB 20: Brawl on the Bayou; Biloxi, Mississippi	September 16, 2023	
3	(United States) Patricia Juarez	BYB 22: Rocky Mountain Brawl; Denver, Colorado	December 2, 2023	

=== National Police Gazette Women's 125-lb World Championship ===
Weight limit: 125 lbs (56 kg)
The inaugural champion, Bec Rawlings, was awarded the National Police Gazette Championship by the Bare Knuckle Boxing Hall of Fame 3 days after her historic win over Alma Garcia.
It was originally known as the National Police Gazette Women's Featherweight World Championship

No.	Name	Event	Date	Defenses
1	(Australia) Bec Rawlings promoted to undisputed champion	N/A	June 5, 2018	1. def. Britain Hart at BKFC 2 on Aug 25, 2018; 2. def. Cecilia Flores at BKFC 4 on Feb 2, 2019
The title was vacated on August 16, 2020 for unknown reasons
1	(United States) Christine Ferea def. Britain Hart	Bare Knuckle Fighting Championship KnuckleMania 2 Hollywood, Florida	February 19, 2022	

=== National Police Gazette Women's Featherweight American Championship ===
Weight limit: 126 lbs (57 kg)

No.	Name	Event	Date	Defenses
1	(United States) Christine Ferea def. Britain Hart	Bare Knuckle Fighting Championship 5 Biloxi, Mississippi	April 6, 2019	
2	(Dominican Republic) Helen Peralta	Bare Knuckle Fighting Championship 7 Biloxi, Mississippi	August 10, 2019	

== See also ==
- International Boxing Hall of Fame
