= Kilrain =

Kilrain may refer to:

== People ==
- Jake Kilrain (1859–1937), ring name of boxer John Joseph Killion
- Jake Kilrain (British boxer) (1914–1984), ring name of boxer Henry Owens
- Susan Kilrain (born 1961), American NASA astronaut

== Fictional ==
- Lee Kilrain, character in the 1947 film The Fabulous Texan
- Dave Kilrain, character in the 1952 film Apache Country
- Lt. Col. Kilrain, character in the 1953 film The Charge at Feather River
- Lieutenant Kilrain, character in the 1957 film The Midnight Story
- Sergeant Buster Kilrain, character in the 1974 novel The Killer Angels and the 1993 film Gettysburg that is based on it

== Other ==
- Kilrain, Thoroughbred horse, winner of the 1913 Wellington Cup
- Canon of Kilrain, canon in the Church of Ireland held by Thomas Gibson
