= Jake Kilrain =

American boxer

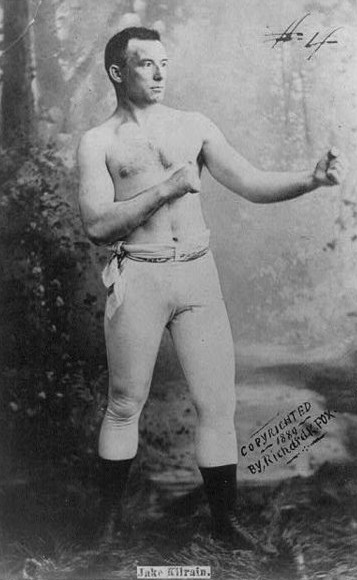

Personal information
- Nationality: American
- Born: John Joseph Killion; February 9, 1859 Greenpoint, New York
- Died: December 22, 1937 (aged 78) Quincy, Massachusetts
- Weight: Heavyweight

Boxing career

Boxing record
- Total fights: 47
- Wins: 31
- Win by KO: 18
- Losses: 5
- Draws: 8
- No contests: 3

John Joseph Killion (February 9, 1859 – December 22, 1937), more commonly known as Jake Kilrain, was a famous American bare-knuckle fighter and glove boxer of the 1880s.

== Early life ==
Kilrain found employment as a teenager in Somerville, Massachusetts. As a country boy from Long Island, he had to learn how to stand up to the workers in the rolling mills. By the age of 20, he had been recognized as the toughest fighter in the mill. Kilrain was also a champion rower having won the National Amateur Junior Sculling Championship in 1883. He was later stripped of that honor when it was discovered that he was a prizefighter and thus could not be considered an amateur.

In 1883, Kilrain took up prizefighting as a profession and quickly established a reputation as a very tough fighter.

== Professional career ==
=== World Championship fight with Jem Smith ===
By 1887 Kilrain already has been recognized as the U.S. National Champion, that gave him an opportunity to fight for the Championship of the World and silver belt versus the British Champion Jem Smith, scheduled to take place in December 1887, in France, at a little island on the River Seine, called St. Pierre d'Autils. The bout was attended by about a hundred of the upper class spectators and journalists, mainly from England, being covered by the major international media of the day, such as Reuters, Gaulois, etc. They fought 1-minute rounds with 30 seconds break between the rounds. At the outset the men fought evenly. After the 3rd round Kilrain scored several knockdowns, and wrestling formed the principal mode of operations for the rest of the fight. Before the 106th round had started, after two hours and a half of fighting (roughly three times the full duration of modern-day 12-round championship fights,) when darkness set in, the bout was stopped due to technical reasons, as no artificial lighting of the scene has been arranged the outcome was called a draw due to darkness.

Clearly dominant throughout the fight (even the English newspapers wrote that "the Englishman was no match for the American crack") upon his return to the United States, Kilrain was pronounced by Richard K. Fox of the National Police Gazette as Heavyweight Champion of the World for his bout with Jem Smith. The awarding of the belt to Kilrain was part of a strategy by Fox to draw Sullivan into a fight. Any remote claim he had to the title of world champion was lost in 1889 after his loss to John L. Sullivan.

=== Bout with John L. Sullivan ===
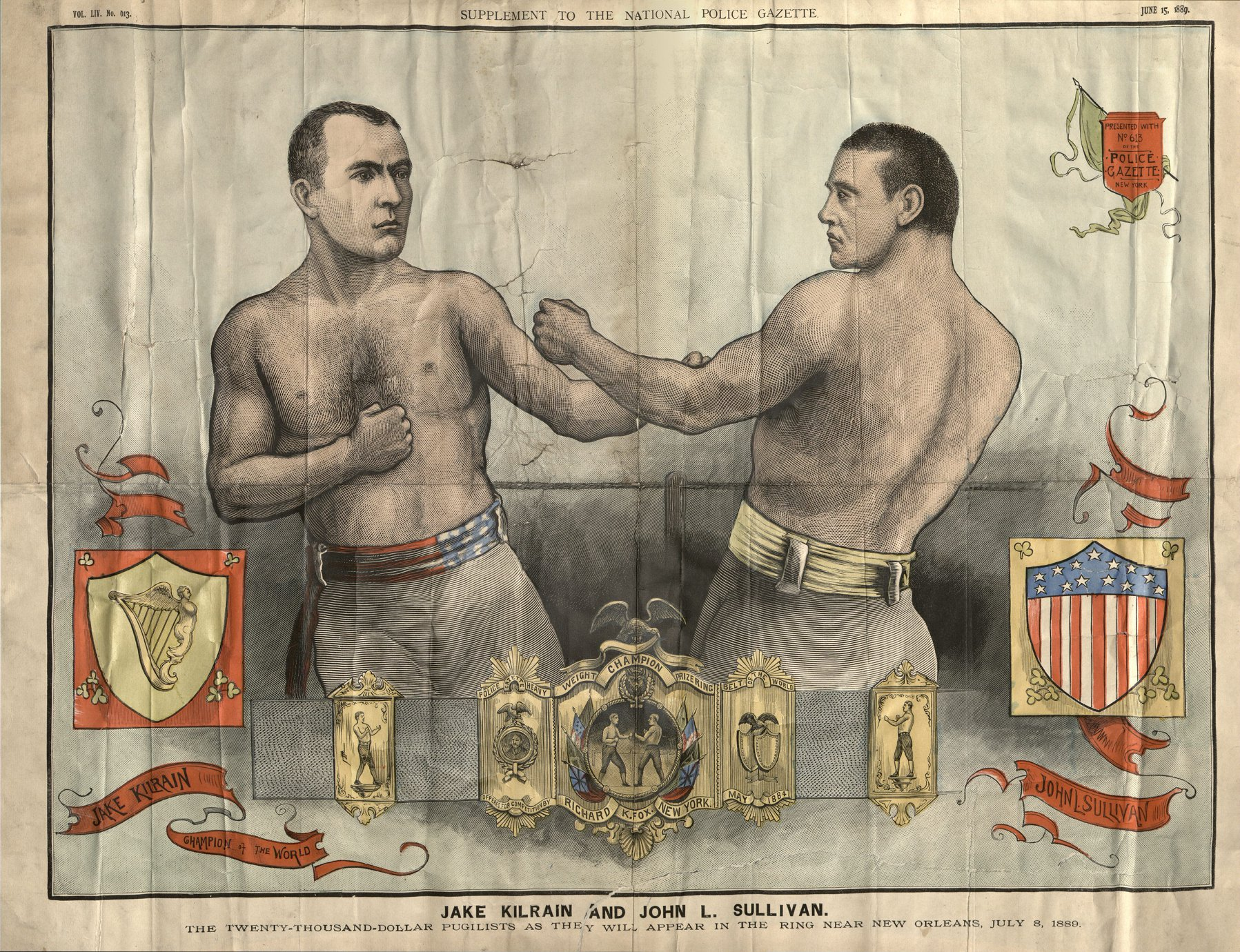
The Kilrain-Sullivan pre-fight poster

Kilrain is perhaps best known for challenging champion John L. Sullivan in 1889 in the last world heavyweight championship prizefight decided with bare knuckles under London Prize Ring rules in history. They fought 1-minute rounds with 50 seconds break between the rounds. In a hard-fought contest, Kilrain lost at the start of the 76th round (after 2 hours 16 minutes) when Mike Donovan, his second, threw in the sponge. Kilrain had not wanted to give up thinking that he could outlast Sullivan, but Donovan defended his actions insisting that Kilrain would have died had the fight gone on. In any case, the Kilrain-Sullivan fight can rightly be listed among the greatest fights of the pre-modern era.

=== Later career ===
Kilrain continued on for 10 more years after the Sullivan fight with gloves under Marquess of Queensberry rules with some success. His most significant win was a 44-round knockout of Boston's George Godfrey in 1891. He retired with a record of 31 wins (18 by KO), six losses, and ten draws, along with three no-decisions and one newspaper decision. He lived in his later years as a devoted family man with his wife and children as proprietor of a saloon in Baltimore, Maryland. After his saloon burned down, he moved back to Somerville and was given a job with the parks department. After government cutbacks during the Great Depression he became a night watchman at a Quincy, Massachusetts shipyard.

In his later life, Kilrain became good friends with John L. Sullivan. When Sullivan died in 1918, Kilrain served as a pallbearer at the funeral. He was also godfather to the English boxer Charley Mitchell's son Charles Mitchell.

== Death and honors ==
Kilrain died on December 22, 1937, in a local hospital from complications of old age and diabetes, aged 78.

Kilrain was elected to the Bare Knuckle Boxing Hall of Fame in 2009 and to the International Boxing Hall of Fame in 2012.

Scottish boxer and welterweight champion Henry Owens would later fight under the name "Jake Kilrain".

== Professional boxing record ==
All information in this section is derived from BoxRec, unless otherwise stated.

=== Official record ===
51 fights	31 wins	6 losses
By knockout	18	5
By decision	13	1
Draws	10	
No contests	3	
Newspaper decisions/draws	1	

All newspaper decisions are officially regarded as "no decision" bouts and are not counted in the win/loss/draw column.

No.	Result	Record	Opponent	Type	Round, time	Date	Location	Notes
51	Loss	31–6–10 (4)	Steve O'Donnell	TKO	5 (15), 2:15	Oct 20, 1899	Germania Maennerchor Hall, Baltimore, Maryland, US	
50	Loss	31–5–10 (4)	Frank Slavin	KO	1 (10), 2:15	Sep 14, 1896	Eureka A.C., Baltimore, Maryland, US	
49	ND	31–4–10 (4)	Abe Ullman	ND	10	Sep 30, 1895	Baltimore, Maryland, US	Exact date unknown
48	Loss	31–4–10 (3)	Steve O'Donnell	TKO	21 (25), 1:18	May 6, 1895	Sea Side A.C., Coney Island, New York, US	
47	Draw	31–3–10 (3)	Steve O'Donnell	PTS	8	Mar 18, 1895	Suffolk A.C., Boston, Massachusetts, US	
46	Loss	31–3–9 (3)	Frank Slavin	TKO	9 (10)	Jun 16, 1891	Granite A.C., Hoboken, New Jersey, US	For world interim heavyweight title (National Police Gazette)
45	Win	31–2–9 (3)	George Godfrey	KO	44	Mar 13, 1891	California A.C., San Francisco, California, US	A finish fight
44	Win	30–2–9 (3)	George Maguire	KO	2 (?)	Dec 4, 1890	Utica, New York, US	
43	Win	29–2–9 (3)	Mike Brennan	PTS	3	Dec 3, 1890	Montana, New York, US	
42	Win	28–2–9 (3)	George Harris	KO	2 (?)	Dec 1, 1890	New York City, New York, US	
41	Win	27–2–9 (3)	Arthur Chambers	PTS	3	Aug 22, 1890	Union Opera House, Ogden, Utah, US	
40	Win	26–2–9 (3)	Jerry Slattery	TKO	2 (?)	Aug 1, 1890	New York City, New York, US	
39	Win	25–2–9 (3)	Dick Mayel	PTS	3	Jun 18, 1890	Cleveland, Ohio, US	
38	Win	24–2–9 (3)	Tommy McManus	PTS	3	Jun 13, 1890	New York City, New York, US	
37	Win	23–2–9 (3)	Frank Straub	KO	4 (?)	Jun 12, 1890	New York City, New York, US	
36	Win	22–2–9 (3)	Frank Bosworth	TKO	3 (4)	Jun 10, 1890	New York City, New York, US	
35	Loss	21–2–9 (3)	James J. Corbett	PTS	6	Feb 18, 1890	Southern A.C., New Orleans, Louisiana, US	
34	Win	21–1–9 (3)	Felix Vacquelin	KO	3 (?)	Feb 2, 1890	New Orleans, Louisiana, US	
33	Loss	20–1–9 (3)	John Scholes	NWS	4	Nov 4, 1889	Mutual Street Rink, Toronto, Ontario, Canada	
32	Loss	20–1–9 (2)	John L. Sullivan	KO	75 (?)	Jul 8, 1889	Richburg, Mississippi, US	For world bare-knuckle heavyweight title; For inaugural world heavyweight title (National Police Gazette); London Prize Ring Rules
31	Draw	20–0–9 (2)	Jem Smith	PTS	106 (?)	Dec 19, 1887	St. Pierre d'Autils, France	Claimed world heavyweight title (National Police Gazette); London Prize Ring Rules
30	Win	20–0–8 (2)	Joe Lannon	TKO	11 (?)	Mar 8, 1887	Watertown, Massachusetts, US	
29	ND	19–0–8 (2)	Jack Ashton	ND	4	Dec 22, 1886	New Assembly Rooms, Baltimore, Maryland, US	
28	ND	19–0–8 (1)	Johny Seidel	ND	4	Dec 22, 1886	New Assembly Rooms, Baltimore, Maryland, US	
27	Win	19–0–8	John P. Clow	PTS	4	Dec 22, 1886	New Assembly Rooms, Baltimore, Maryland, US	
26	Win	18–0–8	Denny Killen	PTS	4	Nov 19, 1886	Comique Theatre, Philadelphia, Pennsylvania, US	
25	Win	17–0–8	Tommy Kelly	KO	4 (4)	Nov 17, 1886	Theatre Comique, Philadelphia, Pennsylvania, US	
24	Win	16–0–8	Joe Godfrey	KO	2 (?)	Nov 15, 1886	Theatre Comique, Philadelphia, Pennsylvania, US	
23	Win	15–0–8	Frank Herald	TKO	1 (?), 2:00	Nov 8, 1886	Herring Run, Maryland, US	Police intervened
22	Win	14–0–8	Jack Ashton	PTS	8	Jul 31, 1886	Ridgewood Baseball Park, New York City, New York, US	
21	Draw	13–0–8	Frank Faber	PTS	?	1886	Boston, Massachusetts, US	
20	Draw	13–0–7	George Fryer	PTS	5	May 15, 1885	Boston, Massachusetts, US	
19	Win	13–0–6	Alf Greenfield	PTS	?	1884-1886	Location unknown	Precise date (including year) & the number of rounds of bout unknown at this time.
18	Win	12–0–6	Jerry Murphy	PTS	4	Jan 5, 1885	Norumbega Hall, Bangor, Massachusetts, US	
17	Draw	11–0–6	Jack Burke	PTS	5	Dec 1, 1884	New England Institute, Boston, Massachusetts, US	
16	Draw	11–0–5	Jem Goode	PTS	5	Jul 3, 1884	Battery D Armory, Chicago, Illinois, US	
15	Draw	11–0–4	Mike Cleary	PTS	4	Jun 26, 1884	Madison Square Garden, New York City, New York, US	
14	Win	11–0–3	William Sherriff	PTS	3 (4)	May 6, 1884	Union Hall, Cambridgeport, Massachusetts, US	Police intervened
13	Draw	10–0–3	Charley Mitchell	PTS	4	Mar 26, 1884	Institute Hall, Boston, Massachusetts, US	
12	Win	10–0–2	Jerry Murphy	KO	2 (?)	Oct 29, 1883	Bangor, Massachusetts, US	Police intervened
11	Draw	9–0–2	Jem Goode	PTS	5	Oct 26, 1883	Conant Hall, Boston, Massachusetts, US	
10	Win	9–0–1	George Godfrey	TKO	3 (3)	May 16, 1883	Boston, Massachusetts, US	Police intervened
9	Win	8–0–1	John McGylnn	TKO	4 (?)	Apr 16, 1883	New Bedford, Massachusetts, US	
8	Win	7–0–1	Pete McCoy	KO	3 (3)	Mar 19, 1883	Mechanics Building, Boston, Massachusetts, US	
7	Win	6–0–1	John Allen	PTS	3	Feb 10, 1883	Boston, Massachusetts, US	Precise date of bout unknown at this time
6	Draw	5–0–1	George Godfrey	PTS	3	Jan 15, 1882	Boston, Massachusetts, US	
5	Win	5–0	John Hughes	PTS	3	Jan 10, 1880	Boston, Massachusetts, US	Precise date of bout unknown at this time
4	Win	4–0	Dennis Roach	TKO	? (?)	Apr 1, 1879	Somerville, Massachusetts, US	Precise date & number of rounds of bout unknown at this time
3	Win	3–0	Dan Dwyer	PTS	? (?)	Mar 10, 1879	Somerville, Massachusetts, US	Precise date & number of rounds of bout unknown at this time
2	Win	2–0	Jem Driscoll	TKO	? (?)	Feb 1, 1879	Somerville, Massachusetts, US	Precise date & number of rounds of bout unknown at this time
1	Win	1–0	Jack Daley	KO	2 (?)	Jan 1, 1879	Somerville, Massachusetts, US	Precise date of bout unknown at this time; Professional debut

=== Unofficial record ===
51 fights	31 wins	7 losses
By knockout	18	5
By decision	13	2
Draws	10	
No contests	3	

Record with the inclusion of newspaper decisions in the win/loss/draw column.

No.	Result	Record	Opponent	Type	Round, time	Date	Location	Notes
51	Loss	31–7–10 (3)	Steve O'Donnell	TKO	5 (15), 2:15	Oct 20, 1899	Germania Maennerchor Hall, Baltimore, Maryland, US	
50	Loss	31–6–10 (3)	Frank Slavin	KO	1 (10), 2:15	Sep 14, 1896	Eureka A.C., Baltimore, Maryland, US	
49	ND	31–5–10 (3)	Abe Ullman	ND	10	Sep 30, 1895	Baltimore, Maryland, US	Exact date unknown
48	Loss	31–5–10 (2)	Steve O'Donnell	TKO	21 (25), 1:18	May 6, 1895	Sea Side A.C., Coney Island, New York, US	
47	Draw	31–4–10 (2)	Steve O'Donnell	PTS	8	Mar 18, 1895	Suffolk A.C., Boston, Massachusetts, US	
46	Loss	31–4–9 (2)	Frank Slavin	TKO	9 (10)	Jun 16, 1891	Granite A.C., Hoboken, New Jersey, US	For world interim heavyweight title (National Police Gazette)
45	Win	31–3–9 (2)	George Godfrey	KO	44	Mar 13, 1891	California A.C., San Francisco, California, US	A finish fight
44	Win	30–3–9 (2)	George Maguire	KO	2 (?)	Dec 4, 1890	Utica, New York, US	
43	Win	29–3–9 (2)	Mike Brennan	PTS	3	Dec 3, 1890	Montana, New York, US	
42	Win	28–3–9 (2)	George Harris	KO	2 (?)	Dec 1, 1890	New York City, New York, US	
41	Win	27–3–9 (2)	Arthur Chambers	PTS	3	Aug 22, 1890	Union Opera House, Ogden, Utah, US	
40	Win	26–3–9 (2)	Jerry Slattery	TKO	2 (?)	Aug 1, 1890	New York City, New York, US	
39	Win	25–3–9 (2)	Dick Mayel	PTS	3	Jun 18, 1890	Cleveland, Ohio, US	
38	Win	24–3–9 (2)	Tommy McManus	PTS	3	Jun 13, 1890	New York City, New York, US	
37	Win	23–3–9 (2)	Frank Straub	KO	4 (?)	Jun 12, 1890	New York City, New York, US	
36	Win	22–3–9 (2)	Frank Bosworth	TKO	3 (4)	Jun 10, 1890	New York City, New York, US	
35	Loss	21–3–9 (2)	James J. Corbett	PTS	6	Feb 18, 1890	Southern A.C., New Orleans, Louisiana, US	
34	Win	21–2–9 (2)	Felix Vacquelin	KO	3 (?)	Feb 2, 1890	New Orleans, Louisiana, US	
33	Loss	20–2–9 (2)	John Scholes	NWS	4	Nov 4, 1889	Mutual Street Rink, Toronto, Ontario, Canada	
32	Loss	20–1–9 (2)	John L. Sullivan	KO	75 (?)	Jul 8, 1889	Richburg, Mississippi, US	For world bare-knuckle heavyweight title; For inaugural world heavyweight title (National Police Gazette); London Prize Ring Rules
31	Draw	20–0–9 (2)	Jem Smith	PTS	106 (?)	Dec 19, 1887	St. Pierre d'Autils, France	Claimed world heavyweight title (National Police Gazette); London Prize Ring Rules
30	Win	20–0–8 (2)	Joe Lannon	TKO	11 (?)	Mar 8, 1887	Watertown, Massachusetts, US	
29	ND	19–0–8 (2)	Jack Ashton	ND	4	Dec 22, 1886	New Assembly Rooms, Baltimore, Maryland, US	
28	ND	19–0–8 (1)	Johny Seidel	ND	4	Dec 22, 1886	New Assembly Rooms, Baltimore, Maryland, US	
27	Win	19–0–8	John P. Clow	PTS	4	Dec 22, 1886	New Assembly Rooms, Baltimore, Maryland, US	
26	Win	18–0–8	Denny Killen	PTS	4	Nov 19, 1886	Comique Theatre, Philadelphia, Pennsylvania, US	
25	Win	17–0–8	Tommy Kelly	KO	4 (4)	Nov 17, 1886	Theatre Comique, Philadelphia, Pennsylvania, US	
24	Win	16–0–8	Joe Godfrey	KO	2 (?)	Nov 15, 1886	Theatre Comique, Philadelphia, Pennsylvania, US	
23	Win	15–0–8	Frank Herald	TKO	1 (?), 2:00	Nov 8, 1886	Herring Run, Maryland, US	Police intervened
22	Win	14–0–8	Jack Ashton	PTS	8	Jul 31, 1886	Ridgewood Baseball Park, New York City, New York, US	
21	Draw	13–0–8	Frank Faber	PTS	?	1886	Boston, Massachusetts, US	
20	Draw	13–0–7	George Fryer	PTS	5	May 15, 1885	Boston, Massachusetts, US	
19	Win	13–0–6	Alf Greenfield	PTS	?	1884-1886	Location unknown	Precise date (including year) & the number of rounds of bout unknown at this time.
18	Win	12–0–6	Jerry Murphy	PTS	4	Jan 5, 1885	Norumbega Hall, Bangor, Massachusetts, US	
17	Draw	11–0–6	Jack Burke	PTS	5	Dec 1, 1884	New England Institute, Boston, Massachusetts, US	
16	Draw	11–0–5	Jem Goode	PTS	5	Jul 3, 1884	Battery D Armory, Chicago, Illinois, US	
15	Draw	11–0–4	Mike Cleary	PTS	4	Jun 26, 1884	Madison Square Garden, New York City, New York, US	
14	Win	11–0–3	William Sherriff	PTS	3 (4)	May 6, 1884	Union Hall, Cambridgeport, Massachusetts, US	Police intervened
13	Draw	10–0–3	Charley Mitchell	PTS	4	Mar 26, 1884	Institute Hall, Boston, Massachusetts, US	
12	Win	10–0–2	Jerry Murphy	KO	2 (?)	Oct 29, 1883	Bangor, Massachusetts, US	Police intervened
11	Draw	9–0–2	Jem Goode	PTS	5	Oct 26, 1883	Conant Hall, Boston, Massachusetts, US	
10	Win	9–0–1	George Godfrey	TKO	3 (3)	May 16, 1883	Boston, Massachusetts, US	Police intervened
9	Win	8–0–1	John McGylnn	TKO	4 (?)	Apr 16, 1883	New Bedford, Massachusetts, US	
8	Win	7–0–1	Pete McCoy	KO	3 (3)	Mar 19, 1883	Mechanics Building, Boston, Massachusetts, US	
7	Win	6–0–1	John Allen	PTS	3	Feb 10, 1883	Boston, Massachusetts, US	Precise date of bout unknown at this time
6	Draw	5–0–1	George Godfrey	PTS	3	Jan 15, 1882	Boston, Massachusetts, US	
5	Win	5–0	John Hughes	PTS	3	Jan 10, 1880	Boston, Massachusetts, US	Precise date of bout unknown at this time
4	Win	4–0	Dennis Roach	TKO	? (?)	Apr 1, 1879	Somerville, Massachusetts, US	Precise date & number of rounds of bout unknown at this time
3	Win	3–0	Dan Dwyer	PTS	? (?)	Mar 10, 1879	Somerville, Massachusetts, US	Precise date & number of rounds of bout unknown at this time
2	Win	2–0	Jem Driscoll	TKO	? (?)	Feb 1, 1879	Somerville, Massachusetts, US	Precise date & number of rounds of bout unknown at this time
1	Win	1–0	Jack Daley	KO	2 (?)	Jan 1, 1879	Somerville, Massachusetts, US	Precise date of bout unknown at this time; Professional debut

== Media ==
Mike Mazurki portrayed Kilrain in the 1942 film Gentleman Jim.

Titles in pretence
Inaugural Champion	World Heavyweight Champion; December 19, 1887– July 8, 1889; Lost bid for Undisputed Title	Vacant Title next held by Peter Maher
