= Jem Smith =

British bare-knuckle boxer

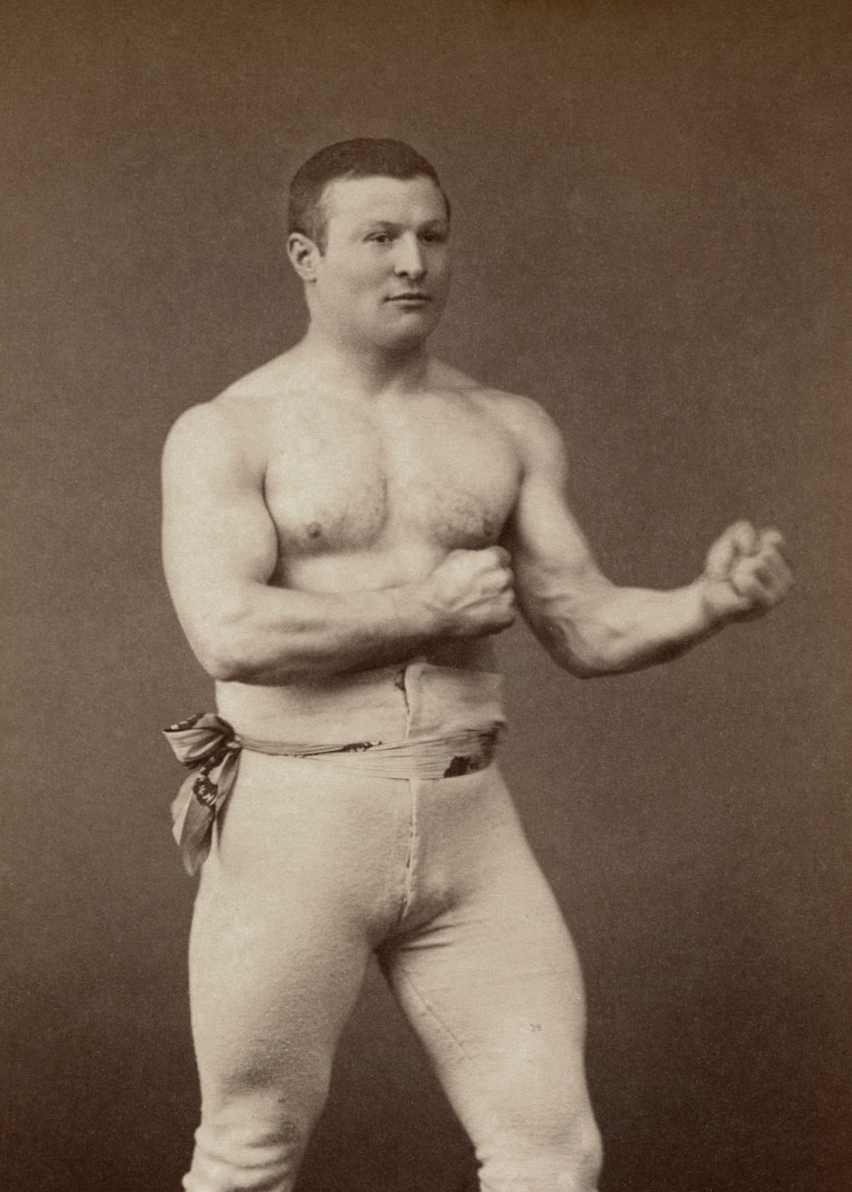
- Smith circa 1885

Personal information
- Nationality: English
- Born: 21 January 1863 Shoreditch, London, England
- Died: 10 September 1931 (aged 68) Willesden, London, England
- Height: 5 ft 8.5 in (1.740 m)
- Weight: 170 to 212 lb (77 to 96 kg)

Boxing career

Boxing record
- Total fights: 14
- Wins: 9
- Win by KO: 4
- Losses: 5
- Draws: 1

Jem Smith (21 January 1863 – 10 September 1931) was a bare-knuckle prize fighter and heavyweight champion of England in the late 19th century and into the early 20th century. In 2010 he was inducted into the Bare Knuckle Boxing Hall of Fame.

== Early career ==
In 1881 he fought his first bare-knuckle prizefight aged 18 years. In 1889, he participated in a fight against Frank Slavin, where he was roundly outclassed by Slavin by all accounts, and knocked out cold for ten minutes, but the circumstances had been so unfairly stacked against his opponent, the referee called it a draw after 14 rounds. It was the last internationally recognized bare-knuckle prizefight, and fought in Bruges, Belgium.

== Titles ==
Smith fought his first heavyweight title fight in 1884 against Woolf Bendoff in the West End of London, England and won by TKO in the 13th round. He fought Jake Kilrain in 1887, in defence of his heavyweight title. The match lasted 2 1/2 hours and after 106 rounds the bout was called a draw due to darkness. In 1891 he fought his last gloved contest against Ted Pritchard in New Cross, also in London, England and lost by a TKO in the 3rd round.

== See also ==
- List of bare-knuckle boxers
