= Sir Arthur Wilson, 3rd Baronet =

Royal Navy Admiral of the Fleet (1842–1921)

Admiral of the Fleet Sir Arthur Wilson Bt VC GCB OM GCVO
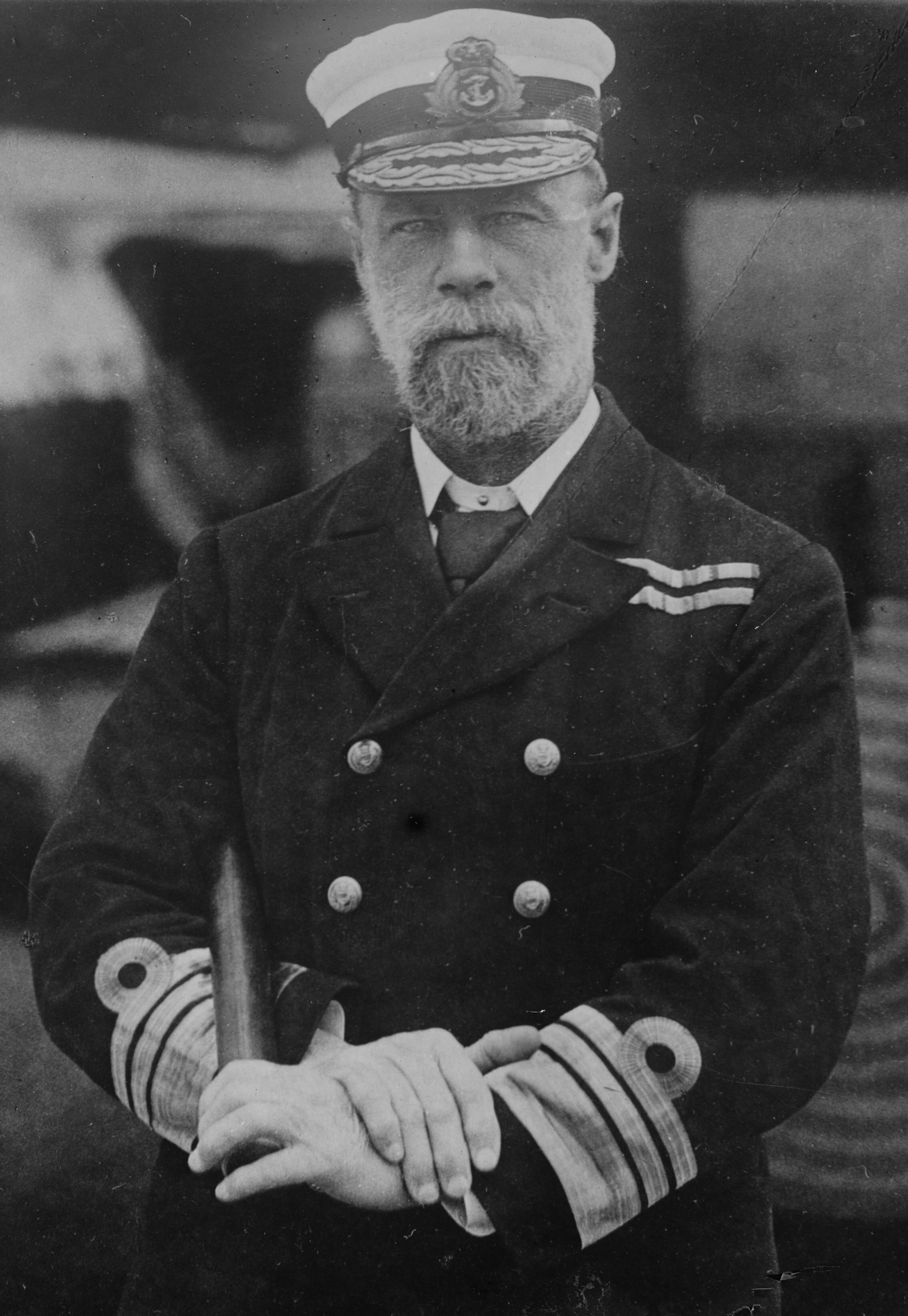
- Vice Admiral Sir Arthur Wilson in c. 1903
- Born: 4 March 1842; Swaffham, Norfolk, England
- Died: 25 May 1921 (aged 79); Swaffham, Norfolk, England
- Burial place: St Peter and St Paul's Churchyard, Swaffham
- Military career
- Allegiance: United Kingdom
- Branch: Royal Navy
- Service years: 1855–1911
- Rank: Admiral of the Fleet
- Nicknames: Tug, Old 'Ard 'Art
- Commands: First Sea Lord; Channel Fleet; Experimental Torpedo Squadron; HMS Sans Pareil; HMS Vernon; HMS Raleigh; HMS Hecla
- Conflicts: Crimean War; Second Opium War; Anglo-Egyptian War; Mahdist War
- Awards: Victoria Cross; Knight Grand Cross of the Order of the Bath; Member of the Order of Merit; Knight Grand Cross of the Royal Victorian Order; Order of the Medjidie (Ottoman Empire); Order of the Dannebrog (Denmark); Order of the Netherlands Lion

Admiral of the Fleet Sir Arthur Knyvet Wilson, 3rd Baronet, VC, GCB, OM, GCVO (4 March 1842 – 25 May 1921) was a Royal Navy officer. He served in the 1882 Anglo-Egyptian War and then the Mahdist War, being awarded the Victoria Cross during the Battle of El Teb in February 1884. He went on to command HMS Raleigh, the torpedo school HMS Vernon and then the battleship HMS Sans Pareil before taking charge of the Experimental Torpedo Squadron. He later commanded the Channel Fleet. He served as First Sea Lord but in that role he "was abrasive, inarticulate, and autocratic" and was really only selected as Admiral Sir John Fisher's successor because he was a supporter of Fisher's reforms. Wilson survived for even less time than was intended by the stop-gap nature of his appointment because of his opposition to the establishment of a Naval Staff. Appointed an advisor at the outbreak of the First World War, he advocated offensive schemes in the North Sea including the capture of Heligoland and was an early proponent of the development and use of submarines in the Royal Navy.

== Early career ==
Born the son of Rear Admiral George Knyvet Wilson and Agnes Mary Wilson (née Yonge), Wilson was educated at Eton College before he joined the Royal Navy as a midshipman aboard the second-rate HMS Algiers in 1855. He was present at the Battle of Kinburn in October 1855 during the Crimean War. He was transferred to fourth-rate HMS Raleigh on the China Station in September 1856 and then, following the loss of the Raleigh near Hong Kong, transferred to the second-rate HMS Calcutta and saw action in command of a gun in the naval brigade at the Battle of Canton in December 1857 and then at the Battle of Taku Forts in May 1858 during the Second Opium War. He was appointed to the steam frigate HMS Topaze on the Pacific Station in September 1859 and was promoted to lieutenant on 11 December 1861. After a tour in the steam frigate HMS Gladiator, he joined the gunnery school HMS Excellent at Portsmouth in April 1865. He became an instructor at the new Imperial Japanese Naval Academy at Yokohama in Japan in May 1867 and then at the new training ship HMS Britannia in January 1869.

Wilson became a member of the committee investigating the effectiveness of the Whitehead torpedo and was involved in its trials in 1870. He became gunnery officer in the training ship HMS Caledonia in the Mediterranean Fleet in 1871 and first lieutenant in the steam frigate HMS Narcissus in October 1872. Promoted to commander on 18 September 1873, he became second-in-command in the new steam frigate HMS Raleigh in January 1874.

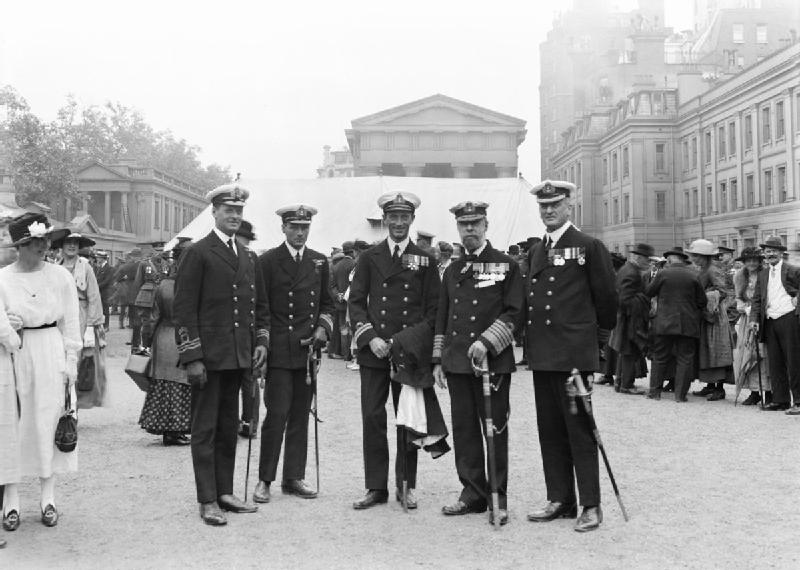
Wilson (second from right) at a party given for holders of the Victoria Cross by King George V at Wellington Barracks

In 1876 Wilson became commander and chief of staff at the new torpedo school HMS Vernon, where his duties included rewriting torpedo manuals, inventing aiming apparatus and developing mine warfare.

== El Teb ==
Promoted to captain on 20 April 1880, Wilson was appointed to command the torpedo boat depot ship HMS Hecla. In the summer of 1882 he was ordered to take the Hecla to Egypt to deliver ammunition for British troops taking part in the Anglo-Egyptian War; on arrival, working with Captain John Fisher, he installed a heavy gun on a railway carriage and created an improvised armoured train. He was awarded the Ottoman Empire Order of the Medjidie, 3rd Class on 12 January 1883.

Early in 1884 the Hecla was sent to Trinkitat on the Red Sea coast of Sudan to support British troops defending Suakin during the Mahdist War. Wilson attached himself to the Naval Brigade and the following deed took place for which he was awarded the VC:

On 29 February 1884, at the Battle of El Teb, Captain Wilson of HMS Hecla attached himself, during the advance, to the right half-battery, Naval Brigade, in place of a lieutenant who was mortally wounded. As the troops closed on the enemy battery, the Arabs charged out on the detachment which was dragging one of the guns, whereupon Captain Wilson sprang to the front and engaged in single combat with some of the enemy, and so protected the detachment until men of the 1st Battalion, York and Lancaster Regiment, came to his assistance.

== Admiralty and Fleet command ==
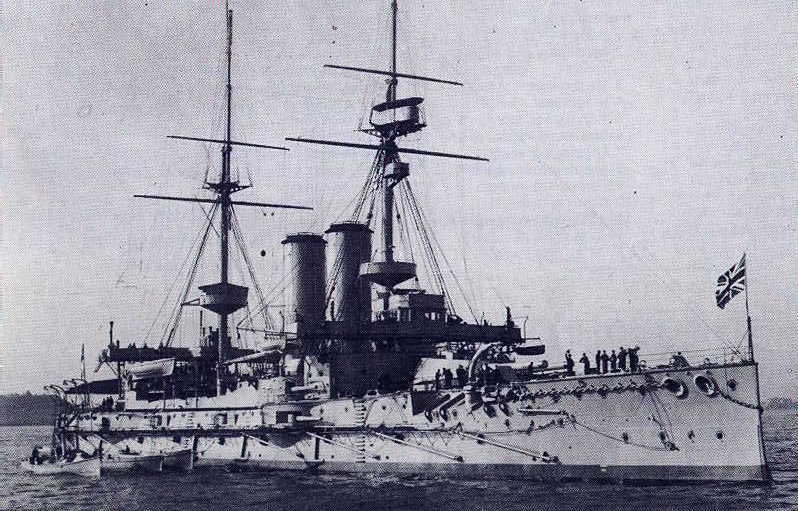
The battleship HMS Exmouth, Wilson's flagship as Commander-in-Chief of the Channel Fleet

Wilson became Flag Captain to the Commander-in-Chief, Cape of Good Hope Station and Captain of the Raleigh in March 1886. He went on to be assistant director of Torpedoes at the Admiralty in April 1887 and was appointed a Companion of the Order of the Bath on 21 June 1887. He went on to be Captain of Vernon in 1889 and Captain of the battleship HMS Sans Pareil in the Mediterranean Fleet in 1892. He was appointed Naval Aide-de-Camp to Queen Victoria on 14 February 1892. In the Sans Pareil he was briefly Flag Captain to the Commander in Chief, Mediterranean Fleet in late 1893. Promoted to rear-admiral on 22 June 1895, he was given command of the experimental torpedo squadron, hoisting his flag in the cruiser HMS Hermione before becoming Second-in-Command of the Reserve Fleet in 1896. He became Third Naval Lord and Controller of the Navy in August 1897 and Senior Officer in Command of the Channel Squadron in March 1901, hoisting his flag in the battleship HMS Majestic upon taking command in April 1901. He was promoted to vice-admiral on 24 May 1901, and advanced to Knight Commander of the Order of the Bath in the 1902 Coronation Honours list published on 26 June 1902, following which he was knighted and received the insignia in an investiture on board the royal yacht Victoria and Albert outside Cowes on 15 August 1902, the day before the fleet review held there to mark the coronation. Wilson took part in the review with the Majestic.

He went on to be Commander-in-Chief, Home Fleet in May 1903 (renamed the Channel Fleet in December 1904), hoisting his flag in the battleship HMS Revenge and then in the battleship HMS Exmouth. He was appointed a Knight Commander of the Royal Victorian Order on 11 August 1903 on the occasion of the King's visit to Ireland, promoted to full admiral on 24 February 1905 and advanced to Knight Grand Cross of the Royal Victorian Order on 11 August 1905 on the occasion of the visit of the French Fleet. He was advanced to Knight Grand Cross of the Order of the Bath on 9 November 1906.

== First Sea Lord ==
Wilson was promoted to admiral of the Fleet on 1 March 1907 and, after three years in retirement, became First Sea Lord in January 1910. In this role he was, according to Hew Strachan, "abrasive, inarticulate, and autocratic" and was really only selected as Admiral John Fisher's successor because he was a supporter of Fisher's reforms. He took part in the funeral of Edward VII in May 1910.

Wilson gave a poor account of himself at the Committee of Imperial Defence meeting after the Agadir Crisis, at which he said that in the event of war the Navy planned to land the Army on the Baltic Coast, an old plan of the recently retired Admiral Fisher, apparently derived from the Seven Years' War of the mid eighteenth century. According to the memoirs of Lord Haldane, Field Marshal William Nicholson (Chief of the Imperial General Staff), asked Admiral Wilson whether the Admiralty had maps of German strategic railways (to show how the Germans could rush reinforcements to invasion spots), and when Wilson said it was not the Admiralty's business to have such maps, Nicholson openly rebuked him and said that if the Navy "meddled" in military matters they needed not just to have such maps but to have studied them. (Note: This exchange is not reflected in the official minutes of the meeting.) The meeting was carried by a lucid presentation by Brigadier-General Henry Wilson, and Prime Minister H. H. Asquith (who thought the Royal Navy plan "puerile and wholly impracticable") ordered the Navy to fall in with the Army's plans to deploy an Expeditionary Force to France. After the meeting Churchill was appointed First Lord of the Admiralty and began setting up a Naval Staff (Admiral Fisher having been opposed to setting one up), whilst Maurice Hankey began to draw up the War Book detailing mobilisation plans.

Wilson survived for even less time than was intended by the stop-gap nature of his appointment because of his opposition to the establishment of a Naval Staff. In the opinion of historian Hew Strachan: "the combination of frequent change and weak appointees (Wilson, Bridgeman and Battenberg) ensured that the professional leadership of the Royal Navy lost its direction in the four years preceding the war". Wilson left the Admiralty in December 1911 and received the Order of Merit on 8 March 1912. He was recalled by Winston Churchill in 1914 at the outbreak of the First World War to provide advice on strategy. He advocated offensive schemes in the North Sea including the capture of Heligoland and was an early proponent of the development and use of submarines in the Royal Navy. He ceased his role as an advisor in November 1918 and inherited a baronetcy from his brother in October 1919.

He died, unmarried, in Swaffham on 25 May 1921 and is buried in the churchyard of St Peter and St Paul's Church. His VC was donated to the Royal Naval Museum, Portsmouth.

== Nicknames ==
Wilson's nickname of 'Tug' is thought to come from a reference to the boxer "Tug" Wilson, who had come to prominence shortly before Wilson received his Victoria Cross, and was noted for his tenacity. It has since become a common nickname, especially in the Navy, for men called Wilson. He was also known as 'Old 'Ard 'Art' for his refusal to consider the cares and comforts of officers and men.

== Sources ==
- Bradford, Admiral Sir Edward E. (1923). Life of Admiral of the Fleet: Sir Arthur Knyvet Wilson. John Murray.
- Heathcote, Tony (2002). The British Admirals of the Fleet 1734–1995. Pen & Sword Ltd. ISBN 0-85052-835-6.
- Hore, Captain Peter (2005). The Habit of Victory: The Story of the Royal Navy 1545 to 1945. Sidgwick & Jackson. ISBN 978-0-28307-312-0.
- Jeffery, Keith (2006). Field Marshal Sir Henry Wilson: A Political Soldier. Oxford University Press. ISBN 978-0-19-820358-2.
- Lambert, Andrew (2008). Admirals. Faber and Faber. ISBN 978-0-571-23156-0.
- Lambert, Nicholas (2001). The Submarine Service, 1900–1918. Ashgate Publishing. ISBN 978-0-7546-0294-1.
- Reid, Walter (2006). Architect of Victory: Douglas Haig. Birlinn Ltd, Edinburgh. ISBN 1-84158-517-3.
- Strachan, Hew (2001). The First World War, Volume I: To Arms. Oxford University Press. ISBN 0-19-820877-4.

Military offices
Preceded by Sir John Fisher	Third Naval Lord and Controller of the Navy; 1897–1901	Succeeded by Sir William May
Preceded by Sir Harry Rawson	Senior Officer in Command, Channel Squadron; 1901–1903	Succeeded by Lord Charles Beresford
Preceded by Sir Gerard Noel	Commander-in-Chief, Home Fleet; 1903–1904	Succeeded by Renamed the Channel Fleet
Preceded by Lord Charles Beresford	Commander-in-Chief, Channel Fleet; 1905–1907	Succeeded by Lord Charles Beresford
Preceded by Lord Fisher	First Sea Lord; 1910–1911	Succeeded by Sir Francis Bridgeman
Baronetage of the United Kingdom
Preceded by Roland Wilson	Baronet (of Delhi); 1919–1921	Extinct
