= Hattie Leslie =

American boxer

Hattie Leslie (allegedly born Libbie Spahn; November 14, 1868 – September 28, 1892) was an American female boxer who fought against Alice Leary in the first US bout in 1888 in Buffalo. Hattie Leslie and Hattie Stewart were known as the "Female John L. Sullivan".

Hattie Leslie married John Leslie who later became her manager.

A bare-knuckle boxer, Hattie Leslie was inducted to the Bare Knuckle Boxing Hall of Fame in 2014.

She died of typhoid pneumonia on September 28, 1892, while on tour in Milwaukee.
