= Sir Roland Wilson, 2nd Baronet =

English Academic and Political Writer

Sir Roland Knyvet Wilson, 2nd Baronet (27 August 1840 - 29 October 1919) was an English academic and political writer. The son of Rear-Admiral George Knyvet Wilson, R.N., Roland's uncle was Sir Archdale Wilson, commander of British forces at the Siege of Delhi, whom he succeeded as 2nd Baronet in 1874.

Wilson was educated at Eton and King's College, Cambridge. In 1867 he was a barrister and then ventured into journalism, working for the Weekly Reporter and Law Journal from 1867 to 1871. He was a reader in Indian Law at the University of Cambridge from 1878 to 1892.

Wilson's history of English law impressed A. V. Dicey due to its documenting the distinction between Blackstonian and Benthamite phases of law reform. Wilson was a classical liberal involved in the Personal Rights Association, an organisation which grew out of opposition to the Contagious Diseases Acts, and his The Province of the State examined legitimate areas of concern for the state.

== Publications ==
- A Short History of Modern English Law (Rivington's Historical Handbooks) (1874).
- History of Modern English Law (Rivingtons) (1875).
- An annotated edition of Sir G. C. Lewis' Use and Abuse of Political Terms (1877).
- An Introduction to the Study of Anglo-Muhammadan Law (1894).
- A Digest of Anglo-Muhammadan Law (1895, 4th edition 1912).
- The Province of the State (1911).
- Individualism and the Land Question: a Discussion (1912).
- The First and Last Fight for the Voluntary Principle in Education (1846-1858) (1915).

Baronetage of the United Kingdom
Preceded by Archdale Wilson	Baronet (of Delhi); 1874–1919	Succeeded by Arthur Wilson
