= Gentleman Jim (film) =

1942 film by Raoul Walsh

- 1942 theatrical poster
- Directed by: Raoul Walsh
- Screenplay by: Vincent Lawrence; Horace McCoy
- Based on: The Roar of the Crowd (1925 autobiography) by James J. Corbett
- Produced by: Robert Buckner
- Starring: Errol Flynn; Alexis Smith
- Cinematography: Sidney Hickox
- Edited by: Jack Killifer
- Music by: Heinz Roemheld
- Distributed by: Warner Bros. Pictures
- Release dates: November 14, 1942; November 25, 1942 (New York City)
- Running time: 104 minutes
- Country: United States
- Language: English
- Budget: $972,000
- Box office: $3,842,000 $2 million (US rentals); 1,255,311 admissions (France)

Gentleman Jim is a 1942 sports drama film directed by Raoul Walsh and starring Errol Flynn as heavyweight boxing champion James J. Corbett (1866–1933). The supporting cast includes Alexis Smith, Jack Carson, Alan Hale, William Frawley, and Ward Bond as John L. Sullivan. The movie was based upon Corbett's 1894 autobiography, The Roar of the Crowd. The role was one of Flynn's favorites.

== Plot ==
In 1887 San Francisco, boxing is illegal. James J. Corbett (Errol Flynn), a brash young bank teller, attends a match with his friend Walter Lowrie (Jack Carson). When a police raid nets Judge Geary, a member of the board of directors of Corbett's bank, Corbett's fast talking gets his superior out of trouble. The judge is looking to improve the image of boxing by recruiting men from more respectable backgrounds and having them fight under the Marquess of Queensberry Rules. He has even imported British coach Harry Watson (Rhys Williams) to evaluate prospects. Watson finds that Corbett, raised in a combative Irish immigrant family headed by Pat Corbett (Alan Hale), has excellent fighting skills; Geary likes his protégé's seemingly-polished manner.

However, Corbett's arrogance irritates many of the upper class, particularly Victoria Ware (Alexis Smith). They clash frequently, but Corbett is attracted to her, and his limitless self-confidence and charm eventually overcome her distaste for him.

Meanwhile, Corbett becomes a professional prizefighter. He acquires a manager, Billy Delaney (William Frawley), and introduces a new, more sophisticated style of boxing, emphasizing footwork over the unscientific brawling epitomized by world champion John L. Sullivan (Ward Bond). After winning several matches, Corbett finally gets the opportunity to take on the great man. Corbett's method of boxing baffles Sullivan, and Corbett wins not only the title, but also Victoria.

Corbett is crowned as the new heavyweight champion. His victory party is unexpectedly interrupted by the defeated Sullivan, who has come to personally present the championship belt to Corbett.

== Cast ==
- Errol Flynn as James J. Corbett
- Alexis Smith as Victoria Ware
- Jack Carson as Walter Lowrie
- Alan Hale as Pat Corbett
- John Loder as Carlton De Witt
- William Frawley as Bill Delaney
- Minor Watson as Buck Ware
- Ward Bond as John L. Sullivan
- Madeleine Lebeau as Anna Held
- Rhys Williams as Harry Watson
- Arthur Shields as Father Burke
- Dorothy Vaughan as Ma Corbett
- Harry Crocker as Charles Crocker (uncredited)
- Art Foster as Jack Burke (uncredited)
- Pat Flaherty as Harry Corbett (uncredited)
- Frank Mayo as Gov. Stanford (uncredited)
- Henry O'Hara as Collis Huntington
- George Lloyd as Harrigan (uncredited)
- Mike Mazurki as Jake Kilrain (uncredited)
- Tor Johnson as The Mauler (uncredited)
- Sammy Stein as Joe Choynski (uncredited)

== Production ==
=== Development ===
In July 1941 it was announced that Warner Bros had purchased the rights to make a film of Corbett's life from his widow, Vera. Errol Flynn was intended to star. Aeneas MacKenzie and Wally Kline were signed to write the screenplay. Ann Sheridan was announced as female co-star.

Director Raoul Walsh had met Corbett when he was a young boy.

Filming was to start in January 1942, after which Flynn was to make The Sea Devil, a remake of The Sea Beast (Warner's version of Moby Dick). Bill Morrow and Ed Beloin, gag writers for Jack Benny, did some work on the script. Phil Silvers was announced in the support cast.

Flynn was very keen to make the movie and undertook extensive boxing training, working with Buster Wiles and Mushy Callahan. However, when the US officially entered World War II it was decided to postpone the movie so Flynn could be rushed into Desperate Journey. While he did this Horace McCoy rewrote the script. Vincent Lawrence then wrote some drafts and Robert Buckner was assigned to produce. There was some doubt the film would be made if Flynn enlisted in the army, but his application was rejected on the grounds of ill-health. Filming began in May 1942.

=== Shooting ===
In his somewhat unreliable 1959 'autobiography' My Wicked, Wicked Ways, Flynn details how he suffered a mild heart attack while making this movie. He collapsed on set on 15 July 1942, while filming a boxing scene with Ward Bond. Filming had to be shut down while he recovered; he returned a week later.

Flynn took the role seriously, and was rarely doubled during the boxing sequences. Alexis Smith recounted in the biography The Two Lives of Errol Flynn by Michael Freedland how she took the star aside and told him, "'It's so silly, working all day and then playing all night and dissipating yourself. Don't you want to live a long life?' Errol was his usually apparently unconcerned self: 'I'm only interested in this half,' he told her. 'I don't care for the future.'"

== Reception ==
=== Box office ===
This was the third Errol Flynn movie to gross at least $2 million for Warner Bros. in 1942, according to Variety.

According to Warners figures, the film earned $1,775,000 domestically and $2,067,000 foreign.

=== Critical response ===
Filmink magazine called the film "terrific fun and Flynn is splendid – he rarely acted with such infectious enjoyment and is obviously having the time of his life in the title role, a part which obviously was close to his real life personality: big headed, cocky, a bit of a prat, the sort of person who has himself paged all the time at a gym just for the thrill of hearing his name spoken out loud, but with a likeable sheen."

== See also ==
- List of American films of 1942
- List of boxing films
