= Wilson baronets of Delhi (1858) =

Escutcheon of the Wilson baronets of Delhi

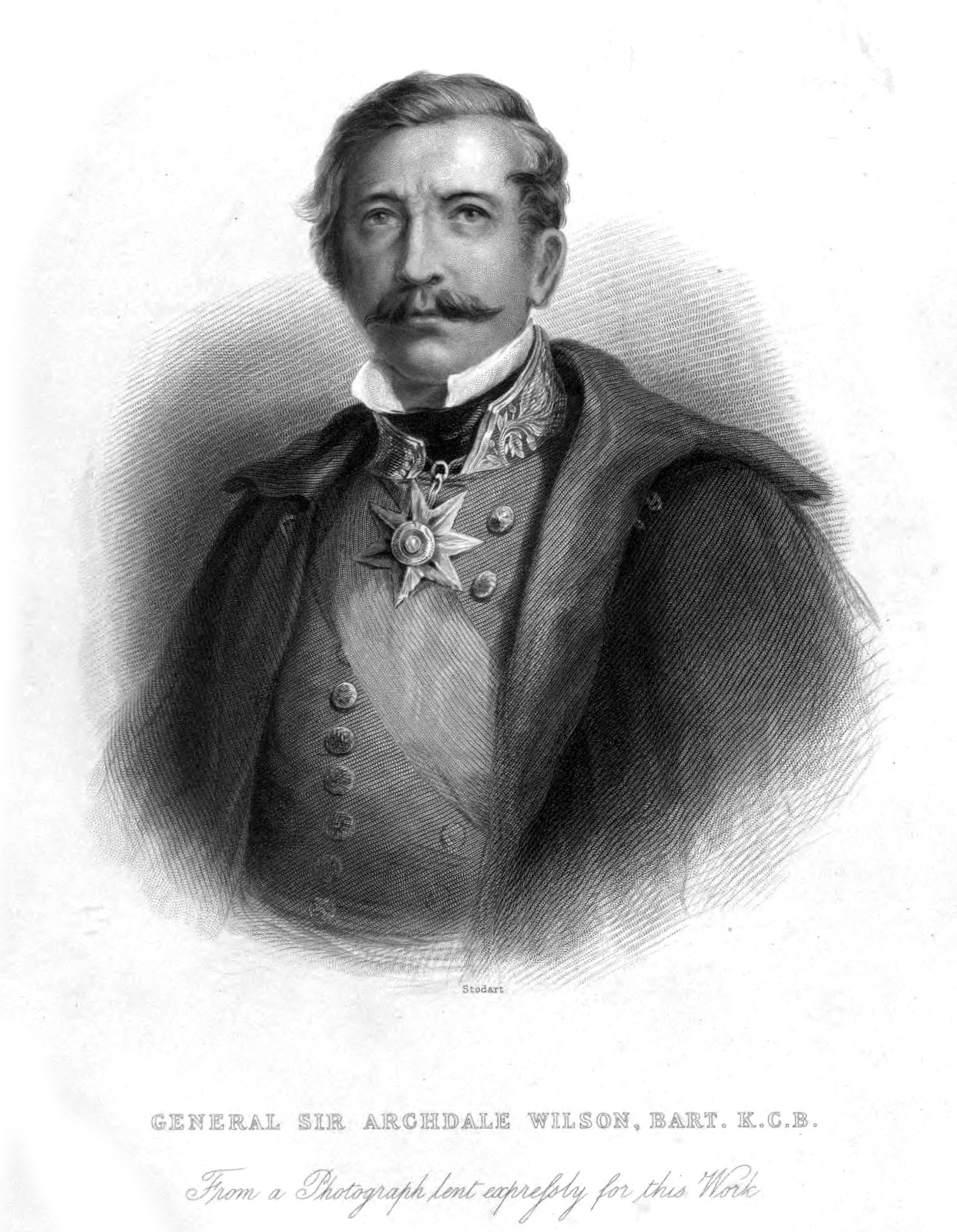
Sir Archdale Wilson, 1st Baronet (1803–1874)

The Wilson baronetcy, of Delhi in India, was created in the Baronetage of the United Kingdom on 8 January 1858 for the soldier Archdale Wilson, whose father George Wilson, rector of Didlington, was younger brother of Henry Wilson, 10th Baron Berners. He had commanded the British troops during the Siege of Delhi in 1857 during the Indian Rebellion. Dying without issue, he was succeeded by two nephews, sons of George Knyvet Wilson RN, Roland (second son) and Arthur (third son).

The 3rd Baronet was a noted naval commander and served as First Sea Lord from 1910 to 1911. The title became extinct on his death, unmarried, in 1921.

== Wilson baronets, of Delhi (1858) ==
- Sir Archdale Wilson, 1st Baronet (1803–1874)
- Sir Roland Knyvet Wilson, 2nd Baronet (1840–1919)
- Sir Arthur Knyvet Wilson, 3rd Baronet (1842–1921)
