= Archdale Wilson =

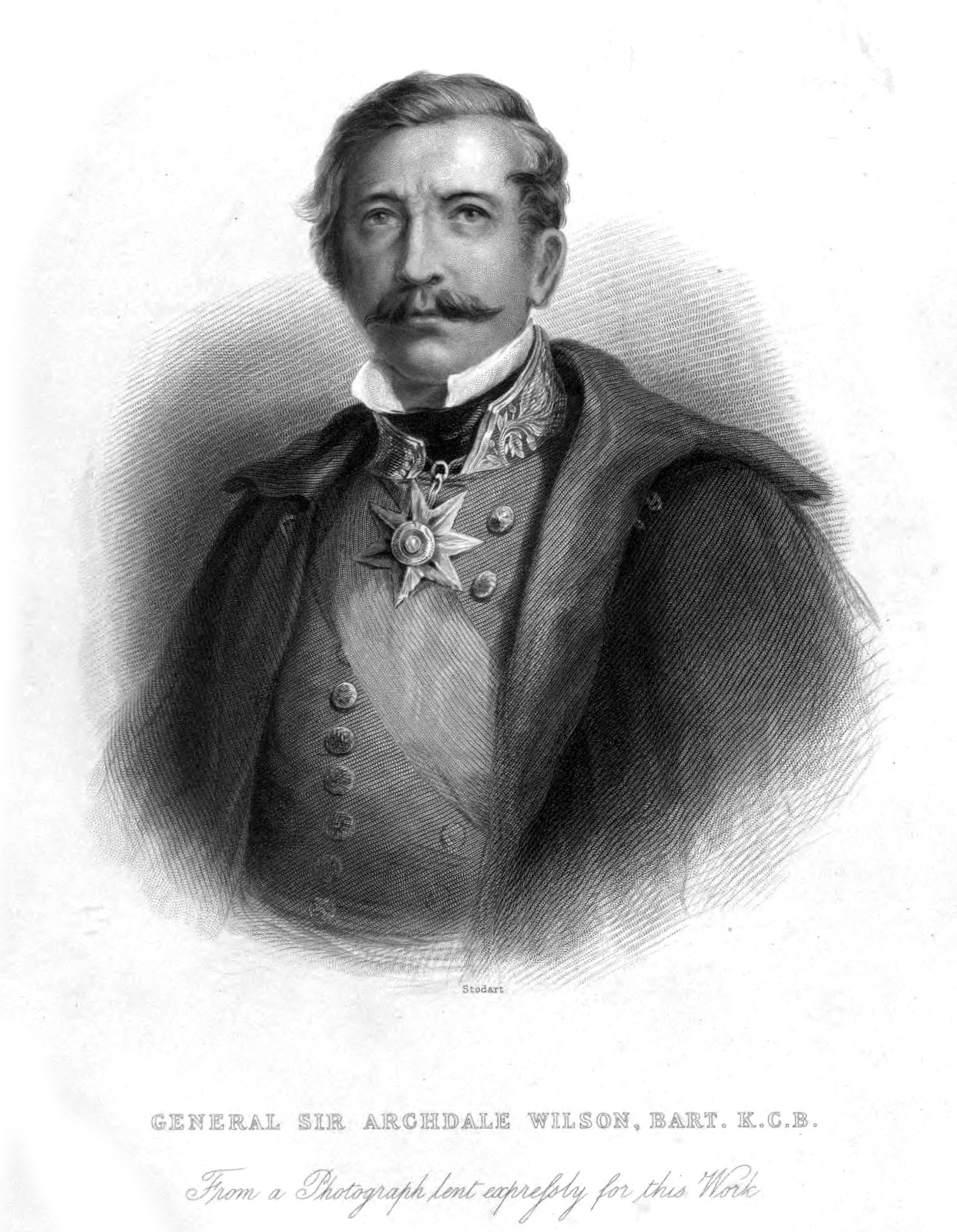
Sir Archdale Wilson, 1st Baronet

Lieutenant-General Sir Archdale Wilson, 1st Baronet, GCB (1803 – 9 May 1874) was a British Bengal Army and British Army artillery officer who served during the Second Sikh War and the Indian Rebellion of 1857, during which he was commended for his part in the capture of Delhi and the relief of Lucknow. For his actions during the rebellion, Wilson was knighted and created a baronet. He later returned to the United Kingdom, where he became a colonel commandant of the Royal Artillery.

== Early life and career ==
The fifth of thirteen sons (alongside one daughter) of the Rev. George Wilson, of Kirby Cane, Norfolk, rector of Didlington (younger brother of the 10th Baron Berners, Wilson was educated at Norwich School. After training at the Honourable East India Company's military college at Addiscombe, Wilson was commissioned in the Bengal Artillery aged eighteen. Reaching India in 1819 he subsequently saw active service in the siege of Bharatpur and during the Second Sikh War. As an artilleryman Wilson was appointed to staff positions which included adjutant-general of the Bengal Artillery and superintendent of the Cossipore foundry.

== Indian Rebellion of 1857 ==
In 1857 Wilson was serving as Brigadier Commandant of Bengal Artillery at Meerut, the regimental headquarters. This was the military station where the mutiny of the Bengal Army first broke out on 10 May 1857. Wilson was to be criticised for his inactivity in Meerut, enabling the bulk of the sepoy mutineers to escape to Delhi. Departing on 27 May, Wilson did however lead his column to victory over the mutineers in an action between Meerut and Delhi on the 30th, then joined with the Delhi Field Force, the commander of which, Sir Henry Barnard, died soon after, Wilson being selected (in preference to three senior officers) in command on 17 July. Delhi was garrisoned by 30,000 fighting men, with Wilson being in command of a mere 7,000; assailed by the enemy, and in very poor health, Wilson nevertheless held his position on Delhi Ridge until, on 4 September, the siege train arrived from the Punjab. Delhi was then captured after six days of street fighting. Wilson subsequently commanded the whole of the artillery at the siege of Lucknow in 1858, for which successes he was nominated in succession a Companion, Knight Commander, and Knight Grand Cross (17 November 1853) of the Order of the Bath, created a baronet 8 January 1858 (with an amended patent issued 8 July 1858, allowing the succession of his baronetcy to the heirs male of his eldest brother, George) and was granted a pension of £1,000 by the East India Company.

== Personal life ==
In 1842, Wilson married Ellen, daughter of General Warren Hastings Leslie Frith, Commandant of the Bengal Artillery; they had no children, and he was succeeded in his baronetcy at his death in 1874 by his nephew, Roland, son of his eldest brother, Rear-Admiral George Knyvet Wilson, R.N.

Baronetage of the United Kingdom
New creation	Baronet (of Delhi); 1858–1874	Succeeded by Roland Wilson
