= Bobby Gunn =

Canadian boxer

Personal information
- Nickname: The Celtic Warrior
- Born: December 25, 1973 (age 52) Niagara Falls, Ontario, Canada
- Weight: Cruiserweight

Boxing career
- Stance: Orthodox

Boxing record
- Total fights: 32
- Wins: 23
- Win by KO: 20
- Losses: 7
- Draws: 1
- No contests: 1

Bobby Gunn (born Robert Williamson, December 25, 1973) is a Canadian former professional boxer and bareknuckle boxer who competed from 1989 to 2017 and twice challenged for a world title (the WBO cruiserweight title in 2007 and the IBF cruiserweight title in 2009).

== Career ==
Gunn was born on December 25, 1973, in Ontario, Canada, into an Irish Traveller family from the Republic of Ireland and the United Kingdom.

Gunn would make a name for himself in the Canadian amateur scene. He had a successful amateur career that spanned seven years. Gunn made his professional boxing debut on April 28, 1989, Tucson, Arizona, winning by unanimous decision over Richard Palmer. In his third pro bout, Gunn stopped future titlist Quirino Garcia in the third round. He would go on to win eight of his next ten fights, before an 11-year hiatus from professional boxing, although he did compete in more than 60 bare-knuckle bouts.

He resurfaced in 2004 and knocked out four straight foes before competing in one of the most notorious matches of the last decade. Gunn came back in 2017 in a fight against Roy Jones Jr but was stopped in the eighth round.

Gunn then put together a solid six-bout unbeaten streak, including a third round stoppage in a rematch against Gross, where he won three different titles. He once again found himself in the limelight on July 11, 2009, when he challenged Ring Magazine and International Boxing Federation champion Tomasz Adamek. Although he was a big underdog against the pound for pound rated Adamek, Gunn hung in tough and had moments of success, but his night was once again cut short. Although the referee admitted after the bout he would have let him continue, ringside physician decided Gunn had taken too many clean punches and stopped the bout following the fourth round.

== Professional boxing record ==
32 fights	23 wins	7 losses
By knockout	20	5
By decision	3	2
Draws	1	
No contests	1	

No.	Result	Record	Opponent	Type	Round, time	Date	Location	Notes
32	Win	23–7–1 (1)	Gilberto Matheus Domingos	TKO	2 (12), 1:21	22 Jul 2017	Charlie’s Harley Davidson, Huntington, West Virginia, U.S.	
31	Win	22–7–1 (1)	James Morrow	TKO	2 (10), 1:51	15 Apr 2017	Charlie’s Harley Davidson, Huntington, West Virginia, U.S.	
30	Loss	21–7–1 (1)	Roy Jones Jr.	TKO	8 (12), 0:07	17 Feb 2017	Chase Center, Wilmington, Delaware, U.S.	For vacant WBF (Foundation) cruiserweight title
29	Loss	21–6–1 (1)	Glen Johnson	UD	8	18 Dec 2013	Sands Casino Resort, Bethlehem, Pennsylvania, U.S.	
28	Loss	21–5–1 (1)	James Toney	RTD	5 (12), 3:00	7 Apr 2012	Landers Center, Southaven, Mississippi, U.S.	For vacant IBU heavyweight title
27	Loss	21–4–1 (1)	Tomasz Adamek	RTD	4 (12), 3:00	11 Jul 2009	Prudential Center, Newark, New Jersey, U.S.	For IBF and The Ring cruiserweight titles
26	Win	21–3–1 (1)	Brad Gregory	TKO	4 (10), 2:14	25 Feb 2009	Medieval Times, Lyndhurst, New Jersey, U.S.	Retained WBC–USNBC cruiserweight title; Won vacant WBA–NABA cruiserweight title
25	Win	20–3–1 (1)	Shelby Gross	TKO	3 (10), 3:02	20 Nov 2008	Celebrity Theatre, Phoenix, Arizona, U.S.	Won vacant WBC–USNBC cruiserweight title
24	Win	19–3–1 (1)	James Morrow	TKO	5 (10), 1:17	12 Jul 2008	Bernie Robbins Stadium, Atlantic City, New Jersey, U.S.	Won vacant WBF Americas cruiserweight title
23	Draw	18–3–1 (1)	Cory Phelps	SD	6	22 Mar 2008	Fort McDowell Casino, Fountain Hills, Arizona, U.S.	
22	Win	18–3 (1)	Benito Fernandez	KO	2 (10)	25 Aug 2007	Robert E. Lee High School, Springfield, Virginia, U.S.	
21	Win	17–3 (1)	Elija Dickens	RTD	1 (6), 3:00	9 Jun 2007	ABC Sports Complex, Springfield, Virginia, U.S.	
20	Loss	16–3 (1)	Enzo Maccarinelli	TKO	1 (12), 2:35	7 Apr 2007	Millennium Stadium, Cardiff, Wales	For WBO cruiserweight title
19	Win	16–2 (1)	Shannon Landberg	TKO	7 (12), 0:36	16 Sep 2006	LCO Casino, Hayward, Wisconsin, U.S.	Won vacant IBA cruiserweight title
18	NC	15–2 (1)	Shelby Gross	NC	2 (12), 2:59	31 Mar 2006	Municipal Auditorium, Nashville, Tennessee, U.S.	Vacant IBA cruiserweight title at stake; Originally a TKO victory for Gross, later changed to NC after Gross failed a drug test
17	Win	15–2	Jimmy Garrett	KO	1 (6)	6 Dec 2005	New Daisy Theatre, Memphis, Tennessee, U.S.	
16	Win	14–2	Jeff Holcomb	TKO	5 (12), 0:41	2 Jun 2005	Tennessee State Fairgrounds arena, Nashville, Tennessee, U.S.	Won vacant NABC All Americas and WBE cruiserweight titles
15	Win	13–2	Earl Kirkendall	TKO	1 (4)	25 Feb 2005	Municipal Auditorium, Nashville, Tennessee, U.S.	
14	Win	12–2	Leon Hinnant	TKO	1 (4)	11 Dec 2004	Greensboro, North Carolina, U.S.	
13	Win	11–2	Rafael Reyes	KO	1 (8)	26 Mar 1993	Ciudad Juarez, Mexico	
12	Win	10–2	Martin Lopez	KO	1 (8)	19 Dec 1992	La Paz, Mexico	
11	Loss	9–2	James Rivas	PTS	4	12 Jun 1992	Casa Grande, Arizona, U.S.	
10	Win	9–1	Sergio Garcia	KO	1 (8)	24 Mar 1992	Palenque del Hipódromo de Agua Caliente, Tijuana, Mexico	
9	Loss	8–1	Sergio Garcia	TKO	2 (6)	16 Aug 1991	Hacienda, Paradise, Nevada, U.S.	
8	Win	8–0	Gary Chavez	TKO	1 (4)	12 Mar 1991	Phoenix, Arizona, U.S.	
7	Win	7–0	Jose Cataneo	PTS	6	18 Dec 1990	Celebrity Theatre, Phoenix, Arizona, U.S.	
6	Win	6–0	Alberto Garcia	TKO	3	14 Nov 1990	Phoenix, Arizona	
5	Win	5–0	Ty Horne	TKO	4	2 Nov 1990	Phoenix, Arizona	
4	Win	4–0	Troy Standley	TKO	1	28 Sep 1990	Tucson, Arizona	
3	Win	3–0	Quirino Garcia	TKO	3 (4)	27 Apr 1990	Amigos Indoor Soccer Stadium, Tucson, Arizona, U.S.	
2	Win	2–0	Jerry Booth	PTS	4	7 Jul 1990	Ramada Inn, Tucson, Arizona, U.S.	
1	Win	1–0	Richard Palma	PTS	4	28 Apr 1989	Holiday Inn Holidome, Tucson, Arizona, U.S.	

== Bare-knuckle boxing record ==
Bobby Gunn has a bare-knuckle boxing record of 73-0 (73 wins and no losses).

== Return to bare-knuckle boxing ==
On Friday, August 5, 2011, Gunn fought Richard Stewart in the first sanctioned bareknuckle boxing match since 1999. Gunn defeated Stewart with a KO in round 3, winning the vacant heavyweight bareknuckle boxing title. Four months later, Gunn defended his bareknuckle crown, stopping Ernest Jackson in less than nine minutes.

== Bare-knuckle boxing Heavyweight World Titles ==
- Bare-knuckle boxing Heavyweight Lineal World Title 2011
- Bare-knuckle boxing Heavyweight World Title 2011 - Recognized by Yavapai Nation
- Bare - knuckle boxing Heavyweight World Title 2015 - Recognized by Bare Knuckle Boxing Hall of Fame
- Bare-knuckle boxing Heavyweight World Title 2016 - Recognized by National Police Gazette

== Bare knuckle fighting championship record ==
Professional record breakdown
1 match	1 win	0 losses
By decision	1	0

Res.	Record	Opponent	Method	Event	Date	Round	Time	Location	Notes
Win	1-0	Irineu Beato Costa Junior	KO (punches)	BKFC 1	June 2, 2018	1	0:41	Cheyenne, Wyoming, US	
