= Tug Wilson (boxer) =

English boxer (1847–1933)

Joseph Collins (31 March 1847 - 31 January 1933) was an English boxer, better known by his nickname of "Tug" Wilson. He gained fame for successfully lasting four rounds against John L. Sullivan, the de facto heavyweight champion, in 1882.

== Early career ==
Collins was born in Leicester in 1847. He boxed competitively under the name of Wilson in the late 1860s; prize-fighting was still illegal in the mid-19th century, and as "Collins alias Wilson" he was prosecuted for "fighting a pitched battle for money" at Aylestone in 1866. As "Tug Wilson of Leicester" he lost to Tom Kenny of Sheffield circa 1865, for a prize of £5.

In October 1878 he was tried and convicted for aiding and abetting an illegal prize-fight at Aylestone, where he acted as second to one of the contestants, and for assaulting the police when it was broken up. His occupation at the time was given as a "shoe hand".

Collins returned to the ring as a contestant in 1879, when he beat Teddy Carney in a 28-round match. A match against Denny Harrington was called off, and a match between Wilson and Alf Greenfield was broken up before being resolved. Wilson then advertised for competitors, and declared himself the English champion by default. The title of "champion" was not clearly defined in this period and there was no central authority to award or regulate it.

== Fight against Sullivan ==
Richard K. Fox of the Police Gazette arranged for Wilson to travel to New York to compete against John L. Sullivan, the undefeated American champion, at Madison Square Garden in July 1882. The challenge was made for Wilson to last four three-minute rounds; he was knocked down 27 times, but remained in the match without being knocked out, and took a prize of around eight thousand dollars. Total attendance at the match was around twelve thousand spectators. Despite being a foreign challenger, he was well received by the American audience, who saw the smaller man as a plucky underdog; Wilson was 10 stone 8 pounds (67 kg), and Sullivan almost 13 stone (83 kg).

Fox had hoped to arrange a rematch between Wilson and Sullivan, which could be presented as a championship title fight, initially under London Prize Ring Rules (bare-knuckle) and then offered as Queensberry rules (gloved). However, the New York city government declared in August that a law against prize fighting would be considered to apply to glove boxing, and that if the fight was attempted in New York again the contestants would be arrested.

== Later career ==
After his return from America, Wilson published a letter in Sporting Life declaring he had "no intention of entering the ring again, having better business to attend to"; he had invested his winnings in a shoe manufacturing business. He continued to box occasionally in exhibition matches in Leicester. He met Sullivan again when he toured England in 1887, but declined the invitation to spar him.

His business declined in later years, and in 1891 he was working as a fish seller, when he was fined 5s after a fight in a Leicester pub.

He died in Leicester, aged 86, on 31 January 1933, survived by his wife and five daughters. His widow, Sarah, died the following July; they had been married for 63 years.

== Legacy ==
Arthur Wilson, a Royal Navy officer who was awarded the Victoria Cross in the Sudan in 1884, was nicknamed "Tug" by his sailors in reference to the boxer. From there, the nickname has since become one of the "inevitable" ones, especially in military circles, applied to any man named Wilson.
