= HMS Hecla (1878) =

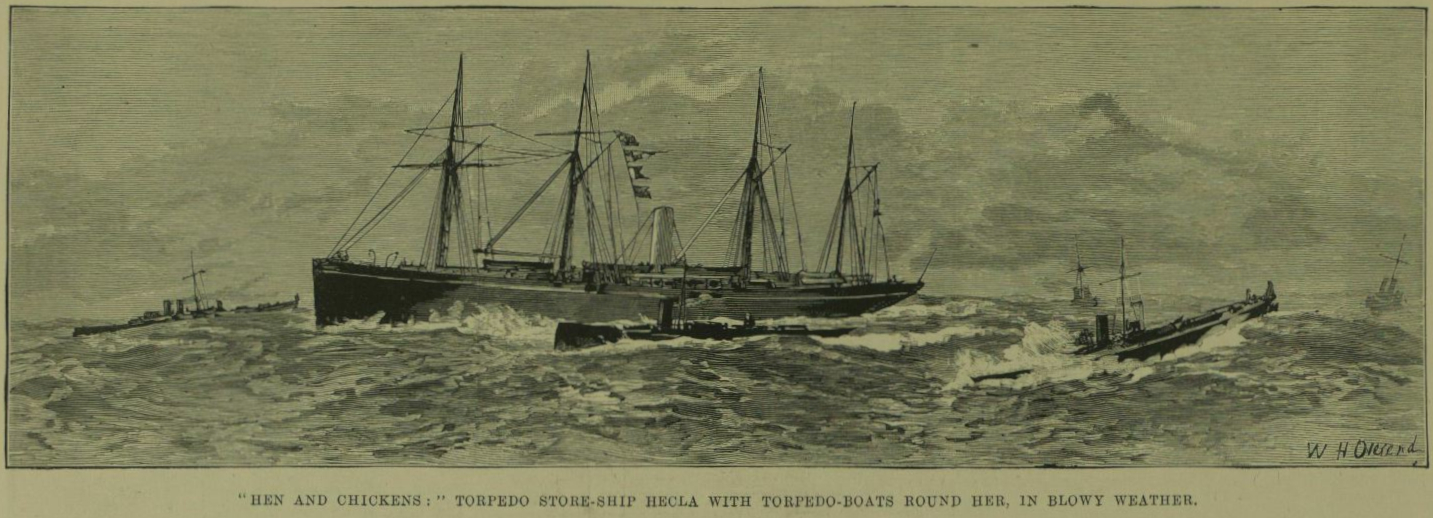
- Torpedo store-ship Hecla with torpedo boats round her in blowy weather

History

United Kingdom
- Name: HMS Hecla
- Builder: Harland & Wolff (Belfast)
- In service: 1878
- Out of service: 1926
- Honours and awards: Bombardment of Alexandria (1882)
- Fate: Broken up (1926)

General characteristics
- Displacement: 3360 grt
- Length: 340 ft 4 in (103.73 m)
- Beam: 38 ft 6 in (11.73 m)
- Propulsion: Two-shaft compound engine providing 2400 iHP constructed by Forrester
- Speed: 13 knots
- Complement: 277
- Armament: 5 x 64 pounder muzzle-loading rifled gun; 1 x 40 pounder breach loading rifled gun; 1×5 inch breech loading rifled gun 4×Torpedo tubes
- Armour: unarmoured

HMS Hecla was a mercantile conversion to a torpedo depot ship for the Victorian Royal Navy, whose seagoing career was from 1878 to 1926. She was broke up in 1926. Built by Harland & Wolff (Belfast) initially as SS British Crown No.117.

Design to carry six torpedo boats. Her armaments were initially 5 x 64 pounder muzzle loading guns and 1 x 40 pounder breach loading gun. Ship Company was 277 men.

== See also ==
- Bombardment of Alexandria – 1882 battle of the Anglo-Egyptian War
