= Billy Madden =

Billy Madden (1852–1918) is best known as a champion American boxer (or 'pugilist'), pugilistic trainer and manager. He was also a playwright, author and journalist, a producer of sporting events including wrestling matches and women's marathon bicycle races.

== Personal life ==
Billy Madden was born on December 10, 1852, in London, England, to Irish parents, and died on February 22, 1918, in White Plains, New York, after a protracted illness, reportedly stomach cancer. Sources report that he came to the United States as a boxer, and he would have been in his very early teens at that time: his first recorded prize fight in the United States was against Hurley, at age 15.

== Career ==
As a welter weight pugilist he won numerous documented fights in the United States and was involved in numerous exhibition matches (in the US and abroad) with notable fighters such as Sullivan, McAuliffe, and Kilrain. Purportedly, he never was punched in the face.

Billy Madden was probably the best known of the late 19th-century American boxing managers. He was reportedly the first to use modern advertising techniques and campaigns to create laudable careers for the pugilists he managed. He was credited with discovering and was indeed the manager of John L. Sullivan, as well as such other noteworthy fighters as Charlie Mitchell, "Nonpariel" Jack Dempsey, Jake Kilrain, McAuliffe, Peter Maher, among others.

Reportedly, he coined the term "Knock-Out" and the phrase "the hand is quicker than the eye". His international reputation was for being "on the level" and he was highly respected in sporting circles. His friendship with sports writer and lawman Bat Masterson was of long standing, as was his friendship with Theodore Roosevelt, the newspaper reporter, sports writer, Governor of New York State and President of the United States. Billy Madden's obituary in the New York Times of February 22, 1918, notes that Madden had a versatile career: as well as his sports experience, he was nominated to run for the New York legislature from the fifth district of Brooklyn in 1906. According to the October 16, 1906, Gilliams Press Syndicate, he was nominated by The Independent League of New York as their candidate for the New York State Senate. The Press Syndicate quoted him as saying " If I go to Albany I will hand a few jolts to the Trusts to show them they cannot control me. I am for the Poor People - You Bet!". In his obituary in the New York Times it was noted that Billy Madden wanted to be known as a self-made man.

Billy Madden was inducted, as a Boxing Manager, into the Bare Knuckles Boxing Hall of Fame in 2010.

== Sources ==
- https://groups.google.com/group/alt.obituaries/browse_thread/thread/d59f332f92165537/216049e61a7912e6?hl=en&lnk=gst&q=billy+madden#216049e61a7912e6
- https://www.nytimes.com/1918/02/22/archives/billy-madden-is-dead-former-manager-of-sullivan-succumbs-to-long.html
- http://www.cyberboxingzone.com/boxing/madden-billy.htm
- Boston's Boxing Heritage: Prizefighting from 1882-1955 by Kevin Smith
- The Manly Art: Bare-Knuckle Prize Fighting in America by Elliott Gorn
- John L Sullivan and His America (Sport and Society) by Michael T. Isenberg
- http://bareknuckleboxinghalloffame.com/
