= Jake Kilrain (British boxer) =

Scottish boxer

Personal information
- Nationality: British
- Born: Henry Owens; 1 January 1914 Bellshill, Lanarkshire, Scotland
- Died: 1 October 1984 (aged 70)
- Weight: Lightweight welterweight middleweight

Boxing career

Boxing record
- Total fights: 138
- Wins: 108
- Win by KO: 38
- Losses: 26
- Draws: 4

Henry Owens (1 January 1914 – 1 October 1984), who fought under the name Jake Kilrain (after the American boxer), was a Scottish boxer who was British welterweight champion between 1936 and 1939.

== Career ==
Born in Bellshill, Lanarkshire, Owens adopted the ring name Jake Kilrain while still an amateur. He adopted the name of American boxer Jake Kilrain. He began his professional career in 1931 and in his first three years won over thirty fights and suffered only two defeats. After a defeat at the hands of the experienced Boyo Rees in April 1934 he was out of the ring for almost a year due to hand injuries before returning with another loss by disqualification to Fred Lowbridge. He won his next four fights, including a fourth-round knockout of Len Wickwar, before meeting Joe Kerr in an eliminator for the Scottish lightweight title, which ended in a draw.

He moved up to welterweight and beat Jim P Boyle in December 1935 to take the Scottish welterweight title. He followed this with wins over Harry Mason, George Purchase, and Billy Graham, before being beaten on points in March 1936 by Ernie Roderick. He beat Seaman Jim Lawlor a month later and then fought Dave McCleave in June that year for the British welterweight title, winning via an eighth-round knockout. Over the next twelve months he had nine fights – seven wins, a draw, and a further defeat to Roderick. He lost to Jimmy Purcell in August 1937, and to Jack Kid Berg in October, before successfully defending his British title in February 1938 against Jack Lord. The second defence of his title was due to take place in July against Roderick, but was twice delayed due to Kilrain's eye injuries and abdominal surgery in November following appendicitis; The fight took place in March 1939 at Anfield, Roderick taking the title with a seventh-round knockout. After winning his next two fights, including victory over former European champion Felix Wouters, the next three years saw most of Kilrain's fights ending in defeat.

By the mid-1940s, Kilrain had moved up to middleweight, and in January 1946 won the Scottish Area middleweight title with a points victory over Jock McCusker. He defended the title in September 1946 against the previously undefeated Eddie Starrs, retaining it with a fourth round stoppage.

On 15 May 1947 he was arrested after a fight against Freddy Price at the Kelvin Hall in Glasgow; After being warned three times for fouls, in the fourth round he was ordered to his corner by the referee, former Scottish middleweight champion Steve McCall, after headbutting Price. Kilrain refused and continued throwing punches, hitting McCall twice in the face, sparking a melee in which several spectators got involved, a man suffered a broken arm, and the referee was thrown out of the ring. Kilrain was charged with striking the referee, and after being found guilty of assault was fined £25, with the option of three months imprisonment. He was subsequently suspended from boxing until the end of the year by the Scottish Council of the BBBofC and fined a further £20.

He returned to the ring in March 1948, beating Johnnie McKenna in one round after McKenna suffered a badly cut mouth. After two defeats later that year he defended his Scottish area title in May 1949 at Celtic Park against Willie Whyte; Kilrain won on points to retain his title, but this proved to be his final fight.

After retiring from boxing, Kilrain became an official, serving on the BBBofC's Scottish Council, and a referee. Kilrain died on 1 October 1984.
