= Mike Cleary =

Irish-American boxer

Personal information
- Nationality: Irish American
- Born: Mike Cleary; May 19, 1858 County Laois, Ireland
- Died: September 5, 1893 (aged 35)
- Weight: Middleweight

Boxing career

Mike Cleary (May 19, 1858 in County Laois, Ireland – September 5, 1893 in Belfast, New York) was an Irish-American boxer.

Cleary was born in County Laois, and emigrated to the United States. He was known as a quick and "scrappy" fighter. On October 18, 1882 he defeated the Middleweight Champion of America, John Rooke, in 3 rounds. Rooke had promised to knock Cleary out before the fourth round.

Cleary suffered an accident which resulted in the amputation of a foot in 1893. He developed tuberculosis and died the same year. He was buried in Belfast, New York, but his body was moved next to his mother's plot at New Cathedral Cemetery in Philadelphia, Pennsylvania.

== See also ==
- List of bare-knuckle boxers
