= Frank "Paddy" Slavin =

Australian boxer

Frank Slavin
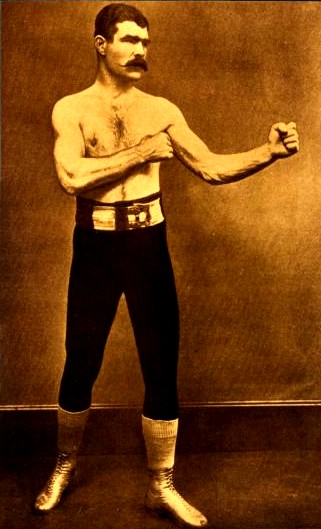

Personal information
- Nicknames: Paddy, The Sydney Cornstalk
- Nationality: Australian
- Born: Frank Patrick Slavin; 5 January 1862 Vacy, New South Wales, Australia
- Died: 17 October 1929 (aged 67) Vancouver, British Columbia, Canada
- Height: 6 ft 1 1/2 in (1.87 m)
- Weight: Heavyweight

Boxing career
- Stance: Orthodox

Boxing record
- Total fights: 83
- Wins: 43
- Win by KO: 38
- Losses: 12
- Draws: 9
- No contests: 19

Frank Patrick Slavin (5 January 1862 – 17 October 1929), also known as "Paddy" Slavin, was an Australian heavyweight boxer. He was a pioneer of prizefighting in his country, fighting under the tutelage of Larry Foley.

One of Slavin's first bouts was against Bob Fitzsimmons, who later became the world's first triple champion. Slavin established himself as one of the best heavyweights of his time by defeating then unbeaten New Zealand champion Harry Laing and eventually capturing the Australian heavyweight championship. In 1890, Slavin was named the world interim heavyweight champion by the National Police Gazette following his defeat of Joe McAuliffe. John L. Sullivan was commonly regarded as the titleholder, but the Gazette declared Slavin the world champion in light of Sullivan's reluctance to fight challengers. He also engaged in a close rivalry with Peter Jackson. The feud, which had started a decade earlier, was resolved in a closely contested fight for the first Commonwealth heavyweight title won by Jackson in May 1892. He fought Frank Craig on Monday 11, March 1895 at Central Hall in London.

Slavin moved to the Yukon during the Klondike Gold Rush. He died in Vancouver at the age of 67. Slavin was inducted to the Australian National Boxing Hall of Fame in 2005.
