= John Mahan =

Bare-knuckle boxer and pugilist

- Born: January 26, 1842; Kells, County Meath, Ireland
- Died: April 5, 1883 (aged 41)
- Occupations: Boxer, politician
- Known for: Bare-knuckle boxer and pugilist who lost to John L. Sullivan in 1881; later involved in New York politics and the Tweed Ring.
- Height: 6 ft 0 in (1.83 m)
- Political party: Democrat

John Mahan (January 26, 1851 – 1895?) was a 19th-century Irish-born American bare-knuckle boxer and pugilist. He was a noted heavyweight fighter in the Northeastern United States during the 1870s and billed as having "an unbeaten record" until his prizefight with future heavyweight champion John L. Sullivan in 1881. Sullivan rose to national prominence as a result of his victory while Mahan went into semi-retirement, taking part in numerous exhibition bouts during the 1880s. Mahan later toured the U.S. with Sullivan and became one of his chief sparring partners.

One-time coroner of Jersey City, New Jersey, he was also involved in New York City politics with Boss Tweed during his boxing career and later involved in the Tweed Ring.

== Biography ==
=== Early life and boxing career ===
John Mahan was born in Kells, County Meath, Ireland on January 26, 1851. Later emigrating to the United States, he became coroner of Jersey City, New Jersey. He was also active in New York City machine politics and, aligning himself Tammany Hall and Boss Tweed, became involved in what would later be referred to as the Tweed Ring.

Like many politicians of the era, Mahan began taking part in professional boxing. Under the ring name Steve Taylor, he eventually established himself as a formidable bare-knuckle boxer and pugilist in the Northeastern United States. He was described as "a six footer, of very powerful build, and as agile as a cat". One of his first major fights was against Billy Edwards at the Brooklyn Rink in Brooklyn, New York on June 5, 1876, which he lost after 17 rounds, and scored an 18-round victory over Charles McDonald later that year.

On November 17, his bout against Brooklyn champion John J. Dwyer at the Lyceum Theatre was interrupted by the New York City Police Department who stopped the fight and the match was declared a draw. A rematch was fought between the two in Philadelphia, Pennsylvania on March 23, 1877, this time with both wearing boxing gloves, in which he lost. Despite this, he earned a reputation as a "game and scientific boxer" from his matches with Dwyer and was referred to by some newspapers as "the ex-heavyweight champion of America". It was reported that he was "almost the only American who could any stand" against Jem Mace when the boxing champion arrived in the U.S. and the two sparred with each other throughout the country.

He often frequented Harry Hill's bar, a hugely popular sportsman resort and the center of New York's sporting culture during the late 19th century. He became a sparring partner for then bare knuckle champion Joe Goss and later helped train Paddy Ryan who would defeat Goss for the title in 1880.

=== Bout with John L. Sullivan ===
On March 31, 1881, at a testimonial benefit in Harry Hill's resort, an offer was made by New York sportsmen in attendance to give $50 to any man who, using Marquis of Queensbury rules, could last four rounds with John L. Sullivan. This was in reference to the more widely known challenge with Sullivan had posted to Paddy Ryan. Taylor, Ryan's former trainer, accepted in this first-ever impromptu boxing match. Refereed by Matt Grace, a well-known collar and elbow wrestler, while Dick Hollywood and Billy Madden were the cornermen for Mahan and Sullivan respectively. Mahan was knocked out by Sullivan "after a few hard licks" in the second round and, in a gesture of good sportsmanship, offered half the prize to his opponent. After the bout, Mahan said "Taylor [Mahan] takes his hat off only to Sully". The event received much attention from the press, this being the young Sullivan's New York debut, and was especially covered by the Police Gazette, the New York Clipper and the New York Herald.

=== Semi-retirement and touring with Sullivan ===
Mahan went into semi-retirement following his match with Sullivan taking part in a few exhibition matches during the next several years. On March 19, 1883, Taylor was one of three opponents Sullivan faced at a benefit at the Mechanics Institute in Boston which earned over $15,000. The event was said to have been "the largest and most noteworthy sparring exposition ever given in New England". He later toured the country with Sullivan, Herbert Slade, Pete McCoy and Mike Gillespie. One of these was against Gillespie at an opera house in McKeesport, Pennsylvania on October 19 of that year. This specific bout was considered a comical exhibition bout, Mahan outweighing the lightweight boxer by at least 40 pounds, and went to three rounds before both men retired. During the match, one man supposedly yelled out to Gillespie that he "either stand on a chair or put his glove on a broomstick".

After holding a two-day exhibition bout at the People's Theater in St. Louis, Missouri from November 5–6, Mahan and Sullivan were arrested by authorities while he and the others were preparing to leave the following morning. The two were charged with violating a state law prohibiting public sparring and boxing exhibitions but, after posting bail, they were forced to forfeit their bonds in order not to make their scheduled tour of California. He faced Mike Gillespie once more at the St. Charles Theatre, then one of the largest venues in the county, and fought four rounds before ending the match for a wrestler vs. boxer match between Charles Bixamos and local lightweight boxer Pat Kendrick.

On October 6, 1884, Mahan fought exhibition bouts against Mike Cleary and Jack Burke at Turn Hall in New York City. He later joined Sullivan on another national tour organized by manager Pat Sheedy and included Joe Lannon, George La Blanche, Jimmy Carroll and Patsy Kerrigan. He fought Jimmy Carroll to 3 rounds at the Masonic Hall in Portland, Oregon on December 10. On March 28, 1887, he and Joe Lannon sparred with Sullivan in Hoboken, New Jersey. He would continue to face Sullivan for several months and, three months before Sullivan embarked on a tour of Europe, Mahan facing him for the last time in Boston on August 8, 1887.

Mahan's last recorded fight was reportedly in Sligo, Ireland against Peter Maher to whom he lost in a 3-round knockout in 1891. According to Harry Hill, while testifying before the Lexow Committee, he claimed that Mahan was working as a bartender in Boston when questioned by lawyer John Goff.

== In popular culture ==
- Mahan was portrayed in the 1945 movie The Great John L. being introduced as Sullivan's undefeated opponent "with 21 straight wins".
