= 1885 in sports =

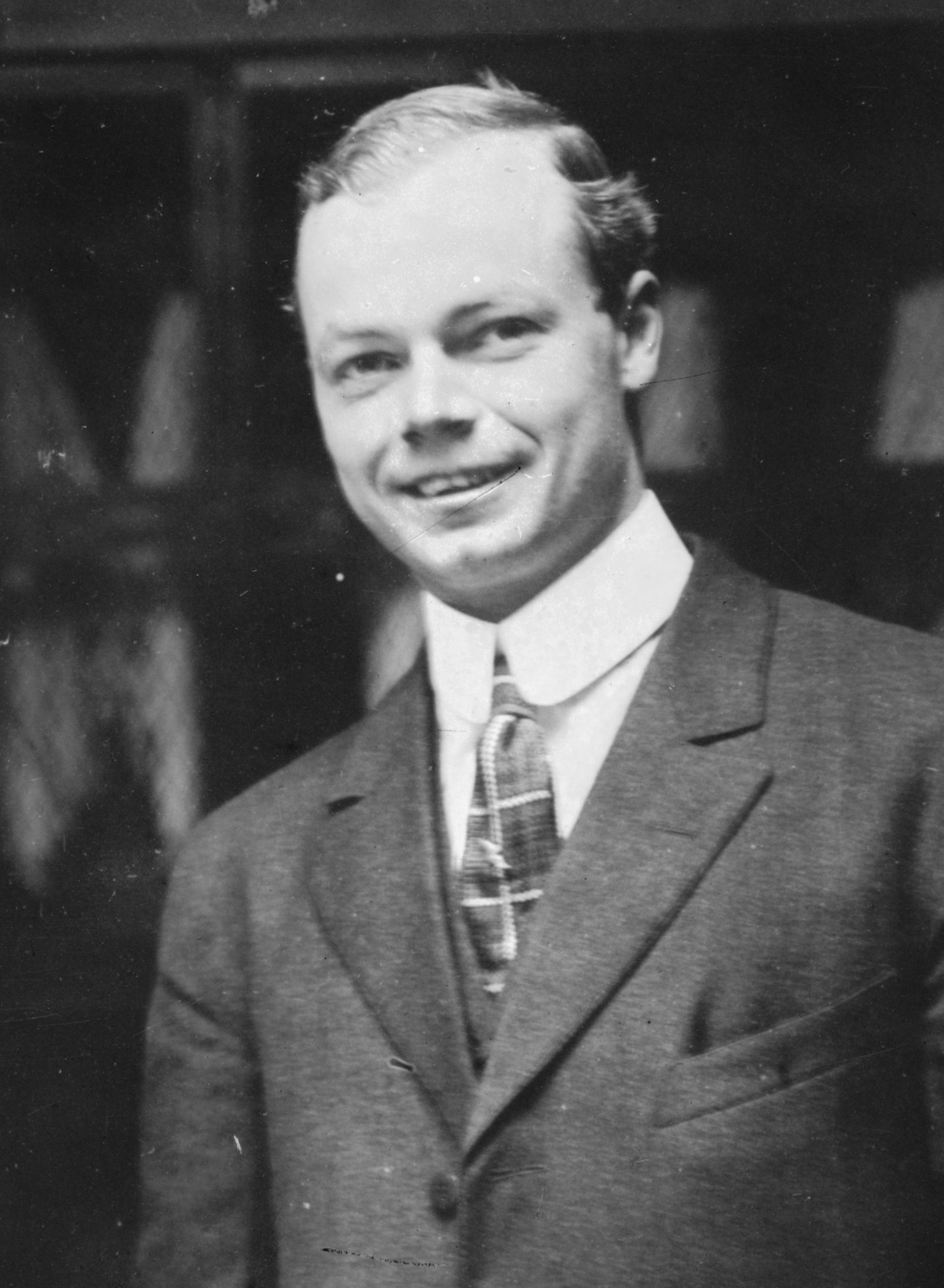
Charles Meldrum Daniels (1885 – 1973), freestyle swimmer from the United States, Olympic gold medailist

1885 in sports describes the year's events in world sport.

== Athletics ==
- USA Outdoor Track and Field Championships

== American football ==
College championship

- College football national championship – Princeton Tigers

== Association football ==
England

- FA Cup final – Blackburn Rovers 2–0 Queen's Park (Glasgow) at The Oval
- 20 July — the Football Association legitimises professionalism
- Millwall FC founded by workers on the Isle of Dogs as Millwall Rovers.
- Southampton FC founded as Southampton St Mary's by members of St Mary's Church YMCA.

Hungary

- Újpest FC was founded in suburb of Budapest on June 16.

Scotland

- Scottish Cup final – Renton 3–1 Vale of Leven at Hampden Park (replay following 0–0 draw)

== Australian Rules Football ==
- Victorian Football Association premiers - South Melbourne
- SANFL premiers - South Adelaide
- WAFL premiers - Rovers

== Canadian Football ==
- Montreal are champions of the QRFU.
- Ottawa College wins the ORFU.
- The QRFU All-Stars are Canadian champions.

== Baseball ==
National championship

- National League v. American Association – Chicago NL ties St Louis A's, 3 games to 3 with one tie.

Events

- The Cuban Giants, composed mainly of African-American players from Philadelphia, is the first black professional baseball team on a reasonably permanent basis. It will sometimes join a league and use a regular home park but more often tour independently.

== Boxing ==
Events

- 29 August — John L. Sullivan's six round defeat of Dominick McCaffrey in Chester Park, Cincinnati, inaugurates the modern World heavyweight boxing championship under Queensberry Rules. The bout is described as being "to decide the Marquess of Queensberry glove contest for the championship of the world". Sullivan will hold the title until 1892.
- World Middleweight Champion Jack (Nonpareil) Dempsey defeats 12 challengers during the year, most of them by knockouts.
- Future World Heavyweight Champion James J. Corbett is the most successful amateur boxer on America's Pacific Coast and takes part in an exhibition bout with Dempsey.

Lineal world champions

- World Heavyweight Championship – John L. Sullivan
- World Middleweight Championship – Jack Nonpareil Dempsey

== Cricket ==
Events

- Nottinghamshire wins the county championship title for a third successive season

England

- Champion County – Nottinghamshire
- Most runs – Walter Read 1,880 @ 44.76 (HS 163)
- Most wickets – George Lohmann 142 @ 14.36 (BB 8–18)

Australia

- Most runs – Billy Barnes 520 @ 43.33 (HS 134)
- Most wickets – Bobby Peel 35 @ 19.22 (BB 7–27)

== Golf ==
Events

- Inaugural British Amateur Championship held at Royal Liverpool Golf Club

Major tournaments

- British Open – Bob Martin

Other tournaments

- British Amateur – Allen MacFie

== Horse racing ==
England

- Grand National – Roquefort
- 1,000 Guineas Stakes – Farewell
- 2,000 Guineas Stakes – Paradox
- The Derby – Melton
- The Oaks – Lonely
- St. Leger Stakes – Melton

Australia

- Melbourne Cup – Sheet Anchor

Canada

- Queen's Plate – Willie W.

Ireland

- Irish Grand National – Billet Doux
- Irish Derby Stakes – St. Kevin

USA

- Kentucky Derby – Joe Cotton
- Preakness Stakes – Tecumseh
- Belmont Stakes – Tyrant

== Ice hockey ==
Events

- 31 January — the Montreal Hockey Club defeats the McGill University 1–0 to win the 1885 Montreal Winter Carnival Ice Hockey Tournament

== Rowing ==
The Boat Race

- 28 March — Oxford wins the 42nd Oxford and Cambridge Boat Race

== Rugby football ==
Home Nations Championship

- The 3rd series of the Home Nations Championship is not completed

Other events

- Establishment of London Welsh RFC and Connacht Rugby

== Speed skating ==
Norway

- 1885 speed skating race at Frognerkilen

== Tennis ==
England

- Wimbledon Men's Singles Championship – William Renshaw (GB) defeats Herbert Lawford (GB) 7–5 6–2 4–6 7–5
- Wimbledon Women's Singles Championship – Maud Watson (GB) defeats Blanche Bingley (GB) 6–1 7–5

USA

- American Men's Singles Championship – Richard D. Sears (USA) defeats Godfrey M. Brinley (USA) 6–3 4–6 6–0 6–3
- The 9th pre-open era Men's Tennis tour gets underway 54 tournaments are staged this year the tour runs from 2 April to 12 October 1885.

== Yacht racing ==
America's Cup

- The New York Yacht Club retains the America's Cup as Puritan defeats British challenger Genesta, of the Royal Yacht Squadron, 2 races to 0
