= John L. Sullivan =

American boxer (1858–1918)

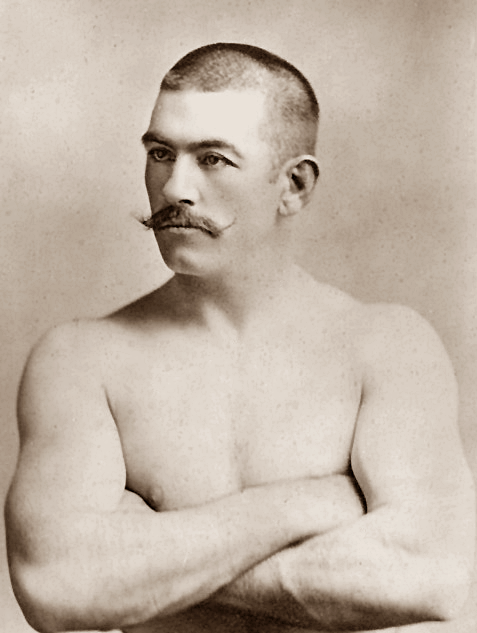
- Sullivan in 1882

Personal information
- Nicknames: Boston Strong Boy; His Fistic Holiness
- Born: John Lawrence Sullivan; October 15, 1858 Boston, Massachusetts, U.S.
- Died: February 2, 1918 (aged 59) Abington, Massachusetts, U.S.
- Height: 5 ft 10 1/2 in (179 cm)
- Weight: Heavyweight

Boxing career
- Reach: 74 in (188 cm)
- Stance: Orthodox

Boxing record
- Total fights: 46
- Wins: 42
- Win by KO: 32
- Losses: 1
- Draws: 3

John Lawrence Sullivan (October 15, 1858 – February 2, 1918) was an American professional boxer. Nicknamed the "Boston Strong Boy" and known as John L. among his admirers, he is recognized as the first heavyweight champion of gloved boxing, de facto reigning from 7 February 1882 to 7 September 1892. He is also generally recognized as the last heavyweight champion of bare-knuckle boxing under the London Prize Ring Rules, being a cultural icon of the late 19th century America, arguably the first boxing superstar and one of the world's highest-paid athletes of his era.

Newspapers' coverage of his career, with the latest accounts of his championship fights often appearing in the headlines, and as cover stories, gave birth to sports journalism in the United States and set the pattern internationally for covering boxing events in media, and photodocumenting the prizefights.

== Early life ==
Sullivan was born on October 15, 1858, in the Roxbury neighborhood of Boston, Massachusetts, to Irish immigrant parents, Michael Sullivan from Abbeydorney, County Kerry and Catherine Kelly from Drum, Athlone, County Roscommon. He attended public schools in his native Boston, attending the Dwight Grammar School and performing well academically.

Sullivan's parents aspired for their son to enter the priesthood as a Catholic priest. To this end Sullivan enrolled at Boston College circa 1875 but after only a few months he turned to playing baseball professionally, earning the substantial sum of $30 to $40 a week for his efforts. As Sullivan recalled in 1883:

"I threw my books aside and gave myself up to it. This is how I got into the base-ball profession, and I left school for good and all. From the base-ball business I drifted into boxing and pugilism."

== Boxing career ==
As a professional fighter Sullivan was nicknamed the "Boston Strong Boy". As a youth he was arrested several times for participating in bouts where the sport was outlawed. He went on exhibition tours offering people money to fight him. Sullivan won more than 450 fights in his career.

Sullivan may have sparred with black boxer James Young at Schieffelin Hall in Tombstone, Arizona, in 1882, though Sullivan later insisted that he never fought a black boxer. If this match did occur, it may have been just a brief sparring session that Sullivan did not regard seriously as a bout.

In 1883–84 Sullivan went on a coast-to-coast tour by train with five other boxers. They were scheduled to hold 195 fights in 136 different cities and towns over 238 days. To help promote the tour, Sullivan announced that he would box anyone at any time during the tour under the Queensberry Rules for $250. He knocked out eleven men during the tour.

In Sullivan's era, no formal boxing titles existed. He became a champion after defeating Paddy Ryan in Mississippi City, near Gulfport, Mississippi, on February 7, 1882. Modern authorities have retroactively labelled Ryan the "Heavyweight Champion of America", but any claim to Ryan's being a "world champion" would have been dubious; he had never contended internationally as Sullivan had.

Depending on the modern authority, Sullivan was first considered world heavyweight champion either in 1885 when he defeated Dominick McCaffrey in Ohio, in 1888 when he fought Charley Mitchell in France, or in 1889 when he knocked out Jake Kilrain in round 75 of a scheduled 80-round bout.

When the modern authorities refer to the "heavyweight championship of the world," they are likely referring to the championship belt presented to Sullivan in Boston on August 8, 1887. The belt was inscribed Presented to the Champion of Champions, John L. Sullivan, by the Citizens of the United States. Its centerpiece featured the flags of the US, Ireland, and the United Kingdom.

=== Charley Mitchell fight ===
In March 1888, Sullivan fought Charley Mitchell, an English prize-fighter, for 39 rounds in defense of his world title.

Mitchell was from Birmingham, England and had fought Sullivan in 1883, knocking him down in the first round before the police halted the contest in the third. Their second meeting took place on March 10, 1888 on the grounds of a chateau at Chantilly, France, with the fight held in driving rain. It went on for more than two hours, and by the end of the bout, both men were unrecognizable and had suffered so much damage that neither could lift his arms up to punch. Both men couldn't continue, and the contest was considered a draw.

At this point, the local gendarmerie arrived and arrested Mitchell. He was confined to jail for a few days and later fined by the local magistrate, because bare-knuckled boxing was illegal in France at the time. Swathed in bandages, Sullivan was helped to evade the law and taken across the English Channel to spend the next few weeks convalescing in Liverpool.

=== The Kilrain fight ===
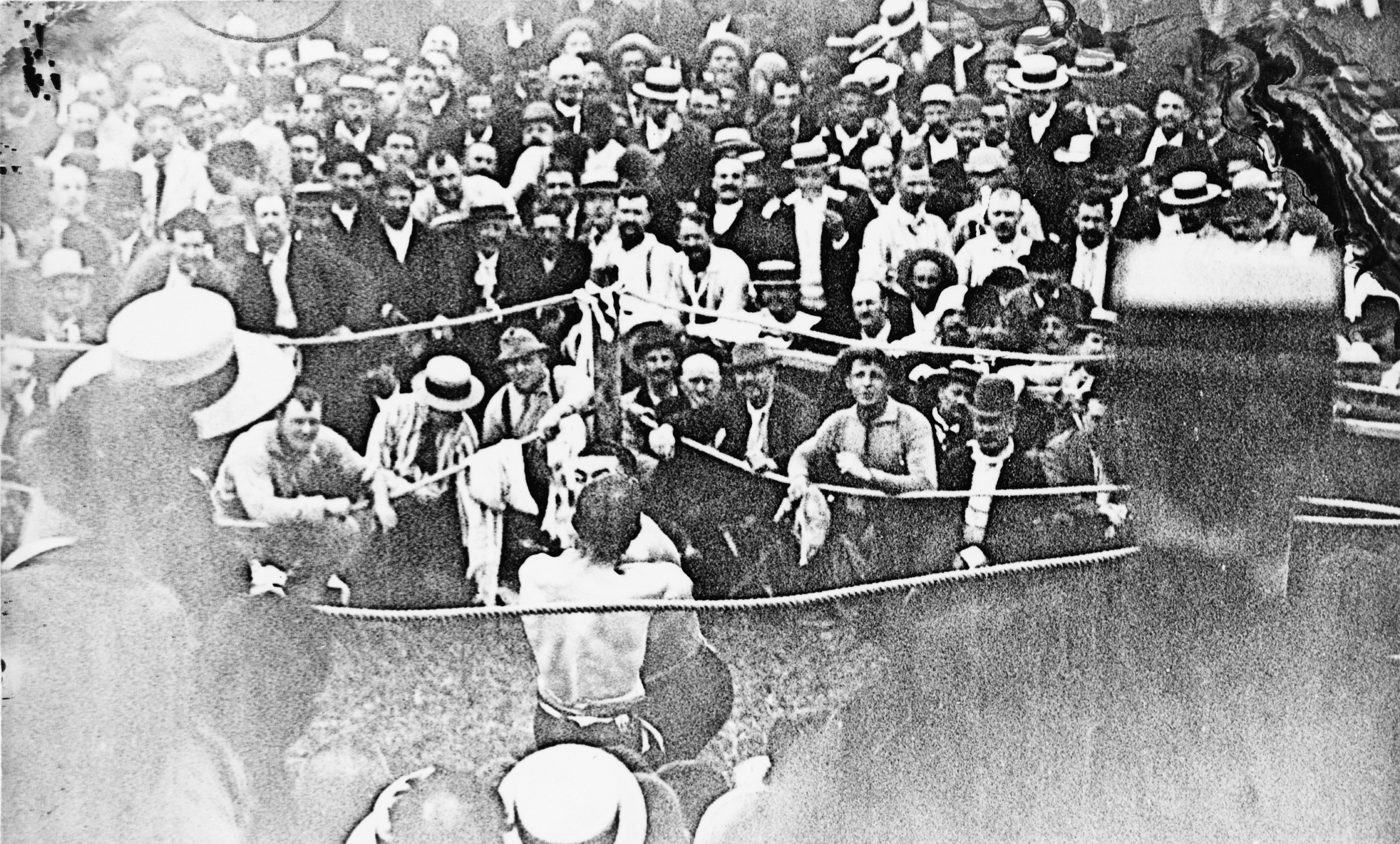
The Sullivan-Kilrain fight

The Kilrain fight is considered to be a turning point in boxing history because it was the last world title bout fought under the London Prize Ring Rules, and therefore was the last-ever bare-knuckle heavyweight title bout. It was also one of the first sporting events in the United States to receive national press coverage.

Newspapers carried extensive pre-fight coverage which included reporting on the fighters' training and speculating on where the bout would take place. The traditional center of bare-knuckle fighting was New Orleans, but the governor of Louisiana had forbidden the fight in that state. Sullivan had trained for months in Belfast, New York, under trainer William Muldoon, whose biggest problem had been keeping Sullivan from liquor. A report on Sullivan's training regimen in Belfast was written by famed reporter Nellie Bly and published in the New York World.

Rochester reporter Arch Merrill commented that occasionally Sullivan would "escape" from his guard. In Belfast village, the cry was heard, "John L. is loose again! Send for Muldoon!" Muldoon would snatch the champ away from the bar and take him back to their training camp.

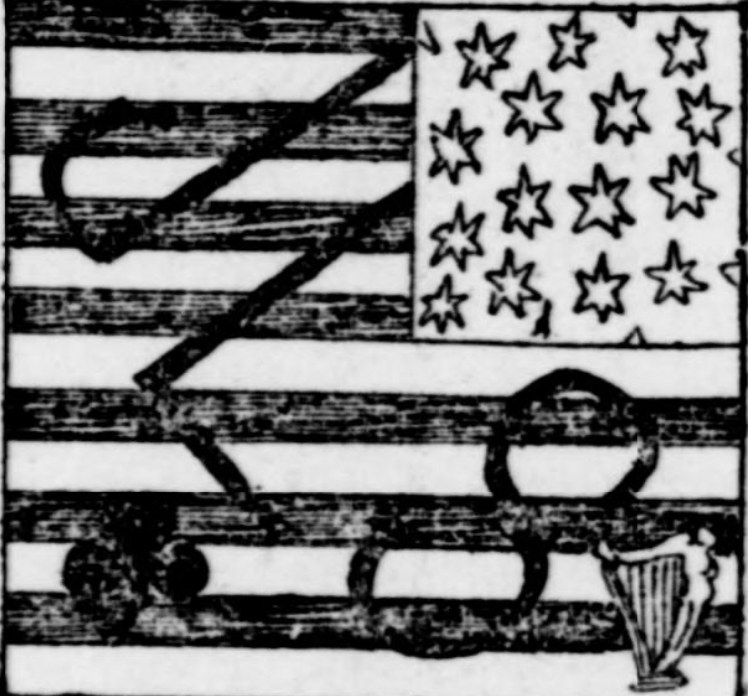
Sullivan's personal flag, 1889

On July 4, 1889, one Kentucky newspaper stated: "The Sullivan-Kilrain prize fight which is to take place in Louisiana on next Monday is now the most talked-about event in sporting circles." The stakes were $20,000 and a diamond world championship belt.

On July 8, 1889, an estimated 3,000 spectators boarded special trains for the secret location, which turned out to be Richburg, a town just south of Hattiesburg, Mississippi. The fight began at 10:30, and at first it looked like Sullivan was going to lose. "The first fall and first blood were awarded to Kilrain, but the first knock-down was accomplished by Sullivan," reported one newspaper. "Kilrain failed to knock Sullivan down at all." Sullivan vomited during the 44th round. However, the champion got his second wind and was able to turn things around for himself. After a grueling beatdown, Kilrain's manager finally threw in the towel after the 75th round.

The Governor of Mississippi offered a $1,000 reward for each fighter.

Today, a historical marker is located at the site of the fight, just off Interstate 59, and the fight is immortalized by the Sullivan-Kilrain Road which runs through the site of the event, at the corner of Richburg Road.

=== Later career ===
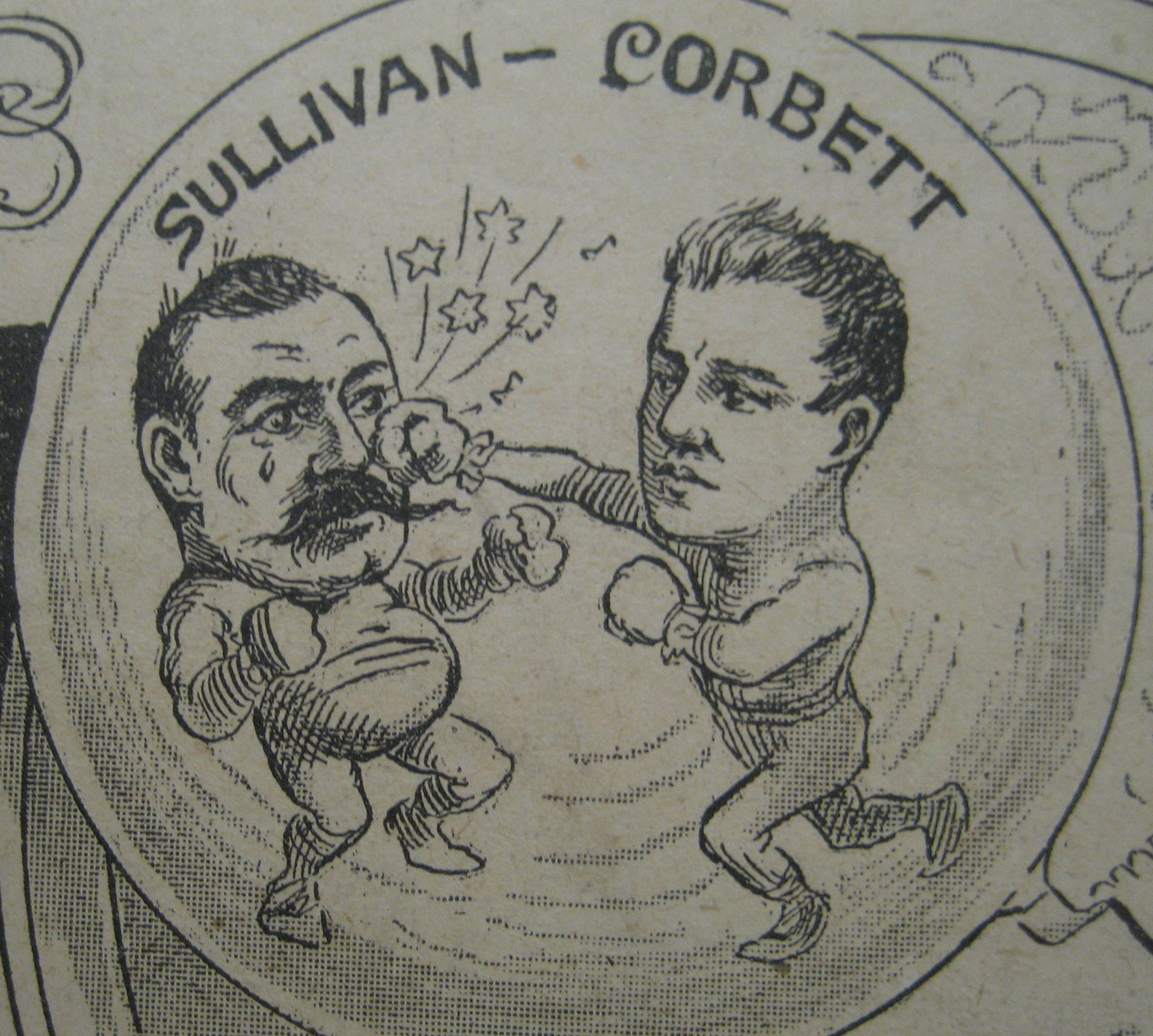
Corbett licks Sullivan.

Sullivan did not defend his title for the next three years. During this period, he was a friend and supporter of Irish boxer Ike Weir, who became America's first Featherweight boxing champion in 1889. Both Weir and Sullivan were Boston natives, and Sullivan occasionally appeared at Weir's bouts.

Sullivan agreed to defend his title in 1892 against challenger "Gentleman Jim" Corbett. The match was on September 7 in New Orleans. It began at 9 p.m. in the electrically illuminated Olympic Club in the upper Ninth Ward neighborhood now known as Bywater section. The venue filled to its 10,000-person capacity despite hefty ticket prices ranging from $5 to $15 (approximately $142 to $426 in 2020). The heavyweight contest occurred under the Marquess of Queensberry Rules, but it was neither the first title fight under those rules nor was it the first title fight using boxing gloves. Corbett was younger and faster, and his boxing technique enabled him to dodge Sullivan's crouch and rush style. In the 21st round, Corbett landed a smashing left "audible throughout the house" that put Sullivan down for good. Sullivan was counted out, and Corbett was then declared the new champion. When Sullivan was able to get back to his feet, he announced to the crowd: "If I had to get licked, I'm glad I was licked by an American".

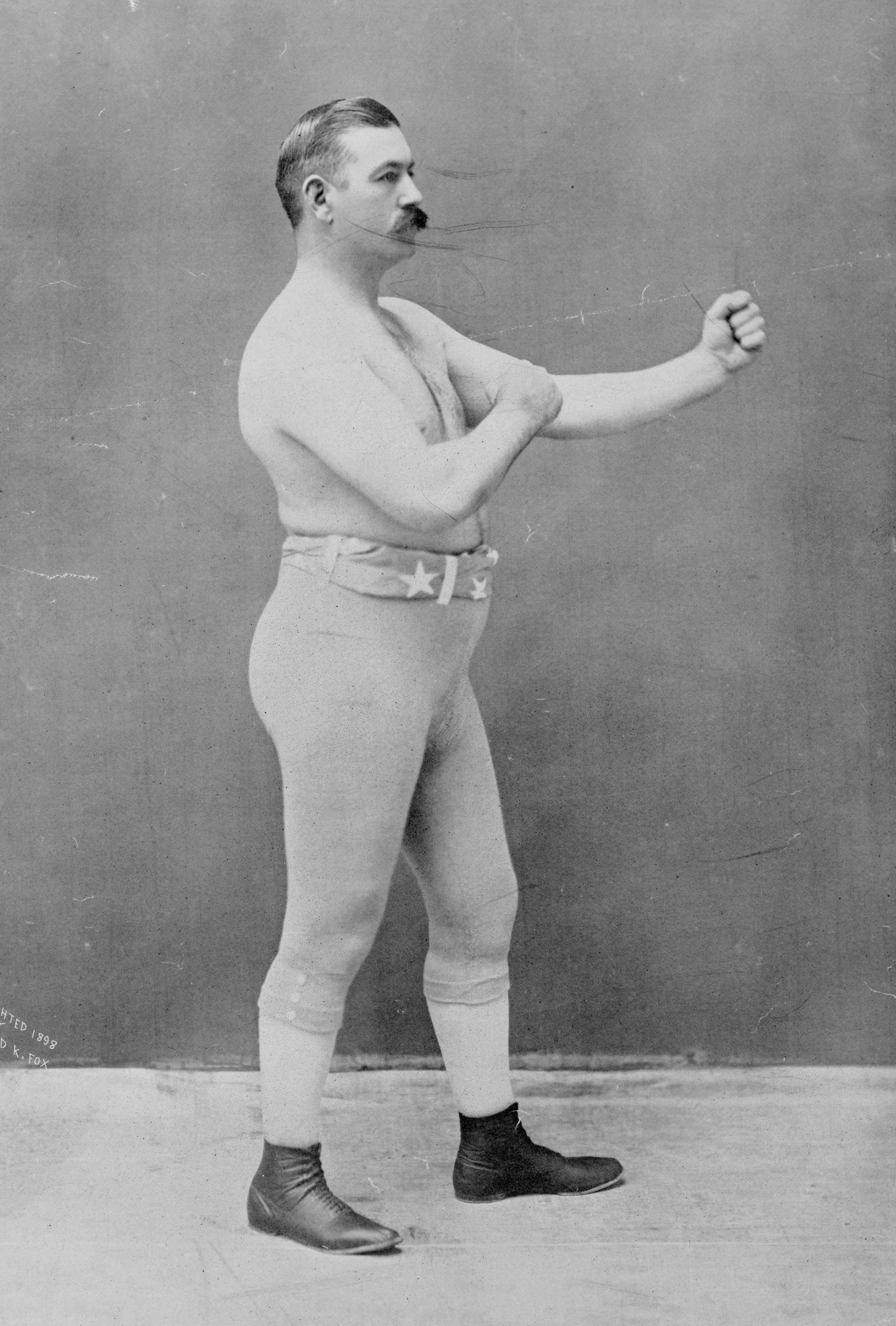
Sullivan as he appeared in 1898, late in his career

In 1895, Sullivan and Paddy Ryan joined the touring company of the musical The Wicklow Postman, and presented exhibition boxing matches before performances of the play.

Sullivan is considered the last bare-knuckle champion because no champion after him fought bare-knuckled. However, Sullivan had fought with gloves under the Marquess of Queensberry Rules as early as 1880, and he only fought bare-knuckled three times in his entire career (Ryan 1882, Mitchell 1888, and Kilrain 1889). His bare-knuckle image was created because his infrequent fights from 1888 up to the Corbett fight in 1892 had been bare-knucklers.

Sullivan retired to Abington, Massachusetts, but appeared in several exhibitions over the next 12 years, including a three-rounder against Tom Sharkey and a final two-rounder against Jim McCormick in 1905 in Grand Rapids, Michigan. He continued his various careers outside boxing, such as being a stage actor, speaker, celebrity baseball umpire, sports reporter, and bar owner. In his later years, Sullivan also gave up his lifelong addiction to alcohol and became a prohibition lecturer.

== Death ==
The effects of prize fighting along with his being overweight and unhealthy after a long life of overindulging in food and alcohol took their toll on the boxer. Like most boxers of the time, he did not live a very long life. Sullivan died on February 2, 1918 at age 59 at his home in Abington, Massachusetts, supposedly from heart disease. At the time of his death, Sullivan had a young boy named Willie Kelly in his custody. The priest of Sullivan's church had brought Kelly, an orphan, to the front of the parish and encouraged anyone with the means to care for the boy to do so.

Sullivan is buried in the Old Calvary Cemetery in Roslindale, a neighborhood of Boston. He died with 10 dollars in his pocket (equivalent to almost $180 in 2018). According to the county where Sullivan died he had an estate worth $3,675.

== Legacy ==
Sullivan was inducted into the International Boxing Hall of Fame in 1990, as a member of the hall's original class. He had a record of 47 wins, 1 loss and 2 draws, with 38 wins by knockout, though many sources disagree on his exact record.

The barn where Sullivan trained still stands in the small town of Belfast, New York, and is now the Bare Knuckle Boxing Hall of Fame.

In 1888 the sculptor Cyrus Dallin who was early in his career created a plaster sculpture of Sullivan in a boxing stance in his fighting attire.

Sullivan and Corbett's landmark 1892 fight is depicted in the 1942 Warner Brothers biopic Gentleman Jim, a fictionalized account of their relationship. Ward Bond portrayed Sullivan alternately as a fiery peacock of a heavyweight champion and, after his title loss, as a sweet, sentimental good sport. Sixteen years later, actor Roy Jenson played Sullivan in the 1958 episode, "The Gambler and the Lady", of the syndicated television anthology series, Death Valley Days, hosted by Stanley Andrews. In the story line, Sullivan in his tour of local communities across the country fights an exposition match against Buck Jarrico (Hal Baylor). When the prize money designated to refurbish the school goes missing, both the teacher, Ruth Stewart (Kathleen Case), and the gambler, Brad Forrester (Mark Dana), are falsely accused based on appearances.

Sullivan is mentioned in the 1992 Drama, A River Runs Through It by actor Craig Sheffer

On their 2017 album Life Is Good, the band Flogging Molly made reference to Sullivan on the track 'The Hand of John L. Sullivan'.

== Professional boxing record ==
51 fights	47 wins	1 loss
By knockout	38	1
By decision	8	0
By disqualification	1	0
Draws	2	
No contests	1	

No.	Result	Record	Opponent	Type	Round, time	Date	Location	Notes
51	Loss	47–1–2 (1)	James J. Corbett	KO	21, 1:30	Sep 7, 1892	Olympic Club, New Orleans, Louisiana, U.S.	Lost world heavyweight title Marquess of Queensberry Rules
50	Win	47–0–2 (1)	Jake Kilrain	KO	75 (?)	Jul 8, 1889	Richburg, Mississippi, U.S.	Won inaugural world heavyweight title; Won world bare-knuckle heavyweight title (National Police Gazette); London Prize Ring Rules
49	Draw	46–0–2 (1)	Charley Mitchell	PTS	39	Mar 10, 1888	Chantilly, Oise, France	Retained world heavyweight title claim; London Prize Ring Rules
48	Win	46–0–1 (1)	William Samuells	TKO	3 (3)	Jan 5, 1888	Philharmonic Hall, Cardiff, Wales	
47	Draw	45–0–1 (1)	Patsy Cardiff	PTS	6	Jan 18, 1887	Washington Roller Rink, Minneapolis, Minnesota U.S.	
46	Win	45–0 (1)	Paddy Ryan	KO	3 (?)	Nov 13, 1886	Mechanic's Pavilion San Francisco, California, U.S.	
45	Win	44–0 (1)	Frank Herald	TD	2 (?)	Sep 18, 1886	Coliseum Rink, Pittsburgh, Pennsylvania, U.S.	Agreement on a decision of police intervened
44	Win	43–0 (1)	Dominick McCaffrey	PTS	7 (6)	Aug 29, 1885	Chester Driving Park, Cincinnati, Ohio, U.S.	Claimed inaugural world gloved heavyweight title; Marquess of Queensberry Rules; accidentally fought a 7th round
43	Win	42–0 (1)	Jack Burke	PTS	5	Jun 13, 1885	Driving Park, Chicago, Illinois, U.S.	
42	NC	41–0 (1)	Paddy Ryan	NC	1 (4)	Jan 19, 1885	Madison Square Garden, New York City, New York, U.S.	
41	Win	41–0	Alf Greenfield	PTS	4	Jan 12, 1885	Institute Hall, Boston, Massachusetts, U.S.	
40	Win	40–0	Alf Greenfield	TD	2 (?)	Nov 18, 1884	Madison Square Garden, New York City, New York, U.S.	
39	Win	39–0	John Laflin	KO	4 (?)	Nov 10, 1884	New York City, New York, U.S.	
38	Win	38–0	Enos Phillips	KO	4 (?)0	May 2, 1884	Nashville, Tennessee, U.S.	
37	Win	37–0	William Fleming	KO	1 (4)	May 1, 1884	Memphis, Tennessee, U.S.	
36	Win	36–0	Dan Henry	KO	1 (4)	Apr 29, 1884	Hot Springs, Arkansas, U.S.	
35	Win	35–0	Al Marx	KO	1 (4), 0:55	Apr 10, 1884	Grand Opera House, Galveston, Texas, U.S.	
34	Win	34–0	George M Robinson	DQ	4 (4)	Mar 6, 1884	Mechanic's Pavilion San Francisco, California, U.S.	
33	Win	33–0	Boiquet	KO	1 (?)	Feb 1884	Victoria, British Columbia, U.S.	
32	Win	32–0	James Lang	KO	1 (4)	Feb 6, 1884	Seattle, Washington, U.S.	
31	Win	31–0	Sylvester Le Gouriff	KO	1 (4)	Feb 1, 1884	Astoria, Oregon, U.S.	
30	Win	30–0	Fred Robinson	KO	2 (?)	Jan 12, 1884	Butte, Montana, U.S.	
29	Win	29–0	Jeff Tomkins	KO	1 (?)	Jan 1884	Butte, Montana, U.S.	
28	Win	28–0	Mike Sheehan	TKO	1 (?)	Dec 4, 1883	Davenport, Iowa, U.S.	
27	Win	27–0	Morris Hefey	KO	1 (?)	Nov 26, 1883	Saint Paul, Minnesota, U.S.	
26	Win	26–0	Jim Miles	TKO	1 (?)	Nov 3, 1883	East St. Louis, Illinois, U.S.	
25	Win	25–0	James McCoy	TKO	1 (?)	Oct 17, 1883	McKeesport, Pennsylvania, U.S.	
24	Win	24–0	Herbert Slade	TKO	3 (4)	Aug 6, 1883	Madison Square Garden, New York City, New York, U.S.	
23	Win	23–0	Charley Mitchell	TKO	3 (?)	May 14, 1883	Madison Square Garden, New York City, New York, U.S.	
22	Win	22–0	Harry Gilman	KO	3 (?)	Jan 25, 1883	Toronto, Ontario, Canada	
21	Win	21–0	P J Rentzler	TKO	1 (4)	Nov 17, 1882	Theatre Comique, Tacoma, Washington, U.S.	
20	Win	20–0	Charley O'Donnell	KO	1 (?)	Oct 30, 1882	Chicago, Illinois, U.S.	
19	Win	19–0	S P Stockton	KO	2 (?)	Oct 16, 1882	Fort Wayne, Indiana, U.S.	
18	Win	18–0	Henry Higgins	TKO	3 (4)	Sep 23, 1882	St. James Athletic Club, Buffalo, New York, U.S.	
17	Win	17–0	Joe Collins	PTS	4	Jul 17, 1882	Madison Square Garden, New York City, New York, U.S.	
16	Win	16–0	Jimmy Elliott	KO	3 (?)	Jul 4, 1882	Brooklyn, New York, U.S.	
15	Win	15–0	John McDermont	TKO	3 (?)	Apr 20, 1882	Grand Opera House, Rochester, New Hampshire, U.S.	
14	Win	14–0	Paddy Ryan	RTD	9 (?)	Feb 7, 1882	Mississippi City, Mississippi, U.S.	Won American bare-knuckle heavyweight title (National Police Gazette); London Prize Ring Rules
13	Win	13–0	Jack Burns	KO	1 (4)	Sep 3, 1881	Chicago, Illinois, U.S.	
12	Win	12–0	Captain James Dalton	KO	4 (4)	Aug 13, 1881	Chicago, Illinois, U.S.	
11	Win	12–0	Dan McCarty	KO	1 (?)	Jul 21, 1881	Philadelphia, Pennsylvania, U.S.	
10	Win	10–0	Fred Crossley	KO	1 (4)	Jul 11, 1881	Philadelphia, Pennsylvania, U.S.	
9	Win	9–0	John Flood	KO	8 (?)	May 16, 1881	Yonkers, New York, U.S.	
8	Win	8–0	Steve Taylor	TKO	2 (4)	Mar 31, 1881	Harry Hill's, New York City, New York, U.S.	
7	Win	7–0	Professor John Donaldson	RTD	10 (?)	Dec 24, 1880	Pacific Garden, Cincinnati, Ohio, U.S.	London Prize Ring Rules
6	Win	6–0	George Rooke	KO	3 (?)	Jun 28, 1879	Boston, Massachusetts, U.S.	
5	Win	5–0	John A. Hogan	PTS	4	1879	Boston, Massachusetts, U.S.	
4	Win	4–0	Tommy Chandler	PTS	4	1879	Boston, Massachusetts, U.S.	
3	Win	3–0	Dan Dwyer	TKO	3 (?)	Jun 28, 1879	Boston, Massachusetts, U.S.	
2	Win	2–0	Johnny Cocky Woods	KO	5 (?)	Mar 14, 1879	Boston, Massachusetts, U.S.	
1	Win	1–0	Jack Curley	KO	? (?), (1:14:00)	Mar 13, 1879	Boston, Massachusetts, U.S.	Fight to the finish; Show began on the 13th. Fight began on the 14th at 1am

== Screen portrayals ==
- George Walsh in the 1933 film The Bowery.
- John Kelly in the 1942 film My Gal Sal.
- Ward Bond in the 1942 film Gentleman Jim.
- Greg McClure in the 1945 film The Great John L..
- Roy Jenson in the 1958 episode "The Gambler and the Lady" of the television series Death Valley Days.
- Claude Akins in the 1961 episode "The Hand that Shook the Hand" of the television series Tales of Wells Fargo.

== Footnotes ==
Sporting positions
Preceded by Paddy Ryan	World Heavyweight Bare-Knuckle Champion; February 7, 1882 – August 29, 1885	Title defunct London Prize Ring abolished
New title Under Queensbury Rules	World Heavyweight Boxing Champion; August 29, 1885 – September 7, 1892	Succeeded by James J. Corbett
Records
Preceded by Nonpareil Dempsey	Oldest Living World Champion; August 29, 1885 – February 12, 1918	Succeeded by Torpedo Billy Murphy
