= The Wicklow Postman =

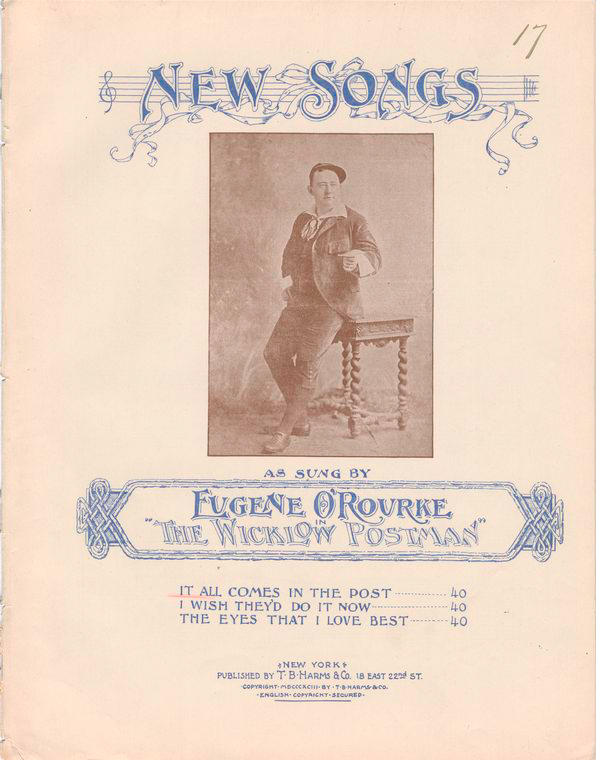
- Sheet music cover with photograph of Eugene O'Rourke in costume
- Music: Eugene O'Rourke; B.H. Janssen
- Lyrics: Eugene O'Rourke; B.H. Janssen; Albert Hall
- Book: Mark Price
- Productions: 1893 New York

The Wicklow Postman is a musical play with a book by Mark Price and music and lyrics mostly by Eugene O'Rourke and B.H. Janssen, that was popular in the 1890s. Set in Wicklow, Ireland, the work was a starring vehicle for the Irish comedian Eugene O'Rourke (1863–1912) who played the title role.

== Productions ==
A production opened in Boston, Massachusetts, in September 1892. The New York production, produced by Lee Harrison, was playing (at least) in the week of April 30, 1893, at H. R. Jacobs' Third Avenue Theatre.

The show opened in Chicago on August 19, 1895, with O'Rourke and Bettina Girard in the female supporting role. In December 1895 the champion boxers John L. Sullivan and Paddy Ryan joined the touring company and presented boxing exhibitions in conjunction with performances of the musical under a single ticket. In 1896, O'Rourke was still touring in the show, appearing in London, Ontario, Canada.

== Songs ==
Based on published sheet music, the songs included were:

- "At the Setting of the Sun"
- "Don't Forget to Send More Me"
- "It All Comes In the Post" (music and lyrics by B. H. Janssen)
- "I Wish They'd Do It Now" (music and lyrics by B. H. Janssen)
- "Just the Girl for Me"
- "Norah" (music by Eugene O'Rourke, lyrics by Albert Hall)
- "The Eyes That I Love Best" (music and lyrics by B. H. Janssen)
