= Simon Finighty =

English boxer

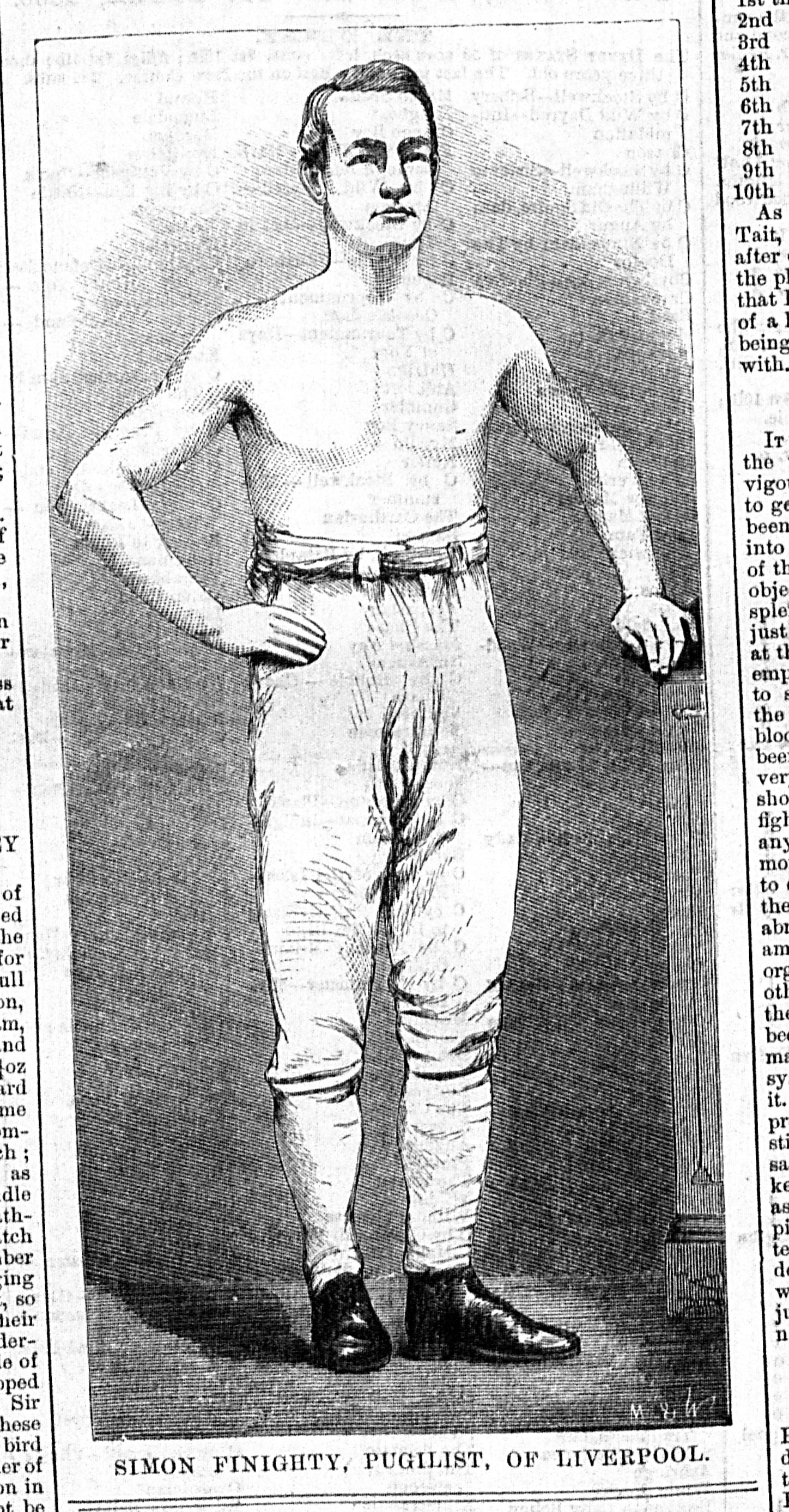
- Sketch of Finighty in 1864

Personal information
- Born: 19 August 1833 Saffron Hill, London, England
- Died: 28 May 1890 (aged 56) Holborn, London, England
- Occupation: Bare-knuckle boxer
- Height: 5 ft 3 in (1.60 m)
- Weight: 108 lb (49 kg), featherweight

Boxing career
- Stance: Used London Prize Ring Rules

Simon Finighty (also known as Simon Finnerty or Finnity; Irish: Síomón Ó Fionnachta; 1833–1890) was a bare-knuckle prize fighter. London-born, of Irish descent, Finighty was a "popular feather-weight pugilist". He was a long-standing member of the Pugilistic Benevolent Association (P.B.A.) and the London Prize Ring (L.P.R.).

== Early life ==
Finighty was born in Saffron Hill on 19 August 1833, to Irish immigrant parents, Daniel, a furrier and skin draper from County Cork), and Catherine (née Mahony). He was baptised on 29 September 1833, at St Mary's Roman Catholic Church in Moorfields. In his youth, Simon Finighty worked as a paper folder.

== Boxing career ==
In his time, Finighty was regarded as "one of the civilest, as well as one of the most scientific boxers." According to The Sporting Life, at his best, Finighty weighed 7st 10lb.

The same newspaper listed the key points of Finighty's career as follows:

In his first encounter he beat Thompson for £25 in thirty-five rounds at Long Reach, November 1852. He next fought a draw with [William] Riley, of Birmingham, for £20, after fighting forty-five rounds in 2 hours 10 min., darkness came on, November 8, 1853; beat Charley Lynch (Boxer), the American feather-weight champion, for £50, ninety-five rounds, 2 hours 48 min. at Hole Haven, on a foul, October 27, 1857; beat J. Norton for £50, forty-six rounds, 1 hour 40 min., down the river, November 9; was beaten by C. Lynch for £100, forty-three rounds, 1 hour 10 min., Kentish Marshes, August 2, 1859; fought a draw with Jack Hartley for £50, twenty-one rounds, 2 hours 6 min., London District (two days), January 27 and 28, 1863. Neither was able to finish on the second day. Fought a drawn battle with Fox for £50 at 8st 1lb, twelve rounds, 1 hour 11 min., Highbury Island, Mersy, January 12, 1864; and lastly fought a drawn battle with W. Mills for £40 at 7st 10lb, eighteen rounds, 2 hours 14 min., in three rings, Liverpool District, January 8, 9, and 10, 1867.

=== Charley Lynch ===
Finighty's greatest acclaim derived from his bouts against Charley 'The American' Lynch. Finighty first met Lynch in the ring in October 1857, and the fight was billed as "the first light-weight international championship." Such was the consequence of this match to the boxing world, that it was still being referenced in sporting publications as late as 1923.

The battle took place on October 27th, 1857, and if it had been fairly fought out I think Lynch would have won, for though Simon was far away the cleverer fighter, and punished his man frightfully, yet Charley was the fresher and stronger, and having taken all that Finighty could give him, would probably have worn the Irishman out in the end, for Simon was not a laster. But unfortunately, the Yankee struck a foul blow - accidentally, no doubt - and the award was given against him.

Finighty and Lynch agreed to a rematch on 2 August 1859. An Era report of the time described the well-anticipated event:

Lynch, The American, and Simon Finighty fought on Tuesday last, at a locality familiar to the members of the P.R. for £50 a side. These heroes of the clenched hand have stood face to face before; but their pretensions were not disposed of on their merits, as it was decided that Lynch had lost the battle by striking a foul blow. His friends, wisely as it turns out, determined to give him another chance and made the present match. The weight was confined to eight stone, and both were within, but while Finighty seemed far from robust, the American, was a wonderfully compact mass of thews and sinews; notwithstanding the fact that Finighty was the favourite at 5 to 4. The contest lasted one hour and ten minutes, and of forty-two rounds [...] At the end of the forty-second round neither of the combatants, so far as appearances went, was materially damaged, but much to the surprise of the majority, Finighty, instead of commencing round forty-three, confessed he was vanquished [...] His fighting at the head had not produced any great effect, and the punishment he had received on the ribs and other parts were too much for his constitution.

== Legal trouble ==
=== False incrimination ===
In 1863, Finighty was wrongly implicated in the murder of John Meers at Teignbridge on 14 August that year. After Meers' body had been found in a large pond on 20 August, it was deduced, by the injuries to his face and neck, that he had met his death by foul play. Subsequent criminal investigation uncovered that, on the second day of the Newton races that year, Meers was seen sparring with a boxer named James Stephens. During the course of the match, the competitors fell out. Stephens, in the company of another prize fighter, John Burke, then set off in the direction of Teignbridge with Meers. A scuffle broke out between Stephens and Meers, with the former dealing Meers "a most severe blow behind the year, knocking him down apparently lifeless" before swinging a brass ball at Meers' head. Meers was then thrown "over the bridge into the pit of water in which [he] was afterwards discovered." It transpired, however, that on arrest, Burke gave his name as Simon Finighty, which was the name widely reported in the initial accounts of the trial. As such, Finighty was compelled to write to the press to clear his name:

Sir: Having seen in the Liverpool Mercury of the 25th September an account of a murder committed at Teignbridge by a man of the name of James Stephens, a pugilist, and that a man of the name of Simon Finighty, a pugilist, connected with a boxing booth, was taken as an accomplice, I beg to say I am the only Simon Finighty of the P.R., and this man has been going under my name, and is an impostor. I have been residing at Mr Thomas Walton's, the Lifeboat House, Liverpool, for these last three months, and have not been out of the town. Wishing you would be so kind as to let my friends know that I am not the man, I remain, sir, yours respectfully, Simon Finighty, P.B.A.

=== Arrest ===
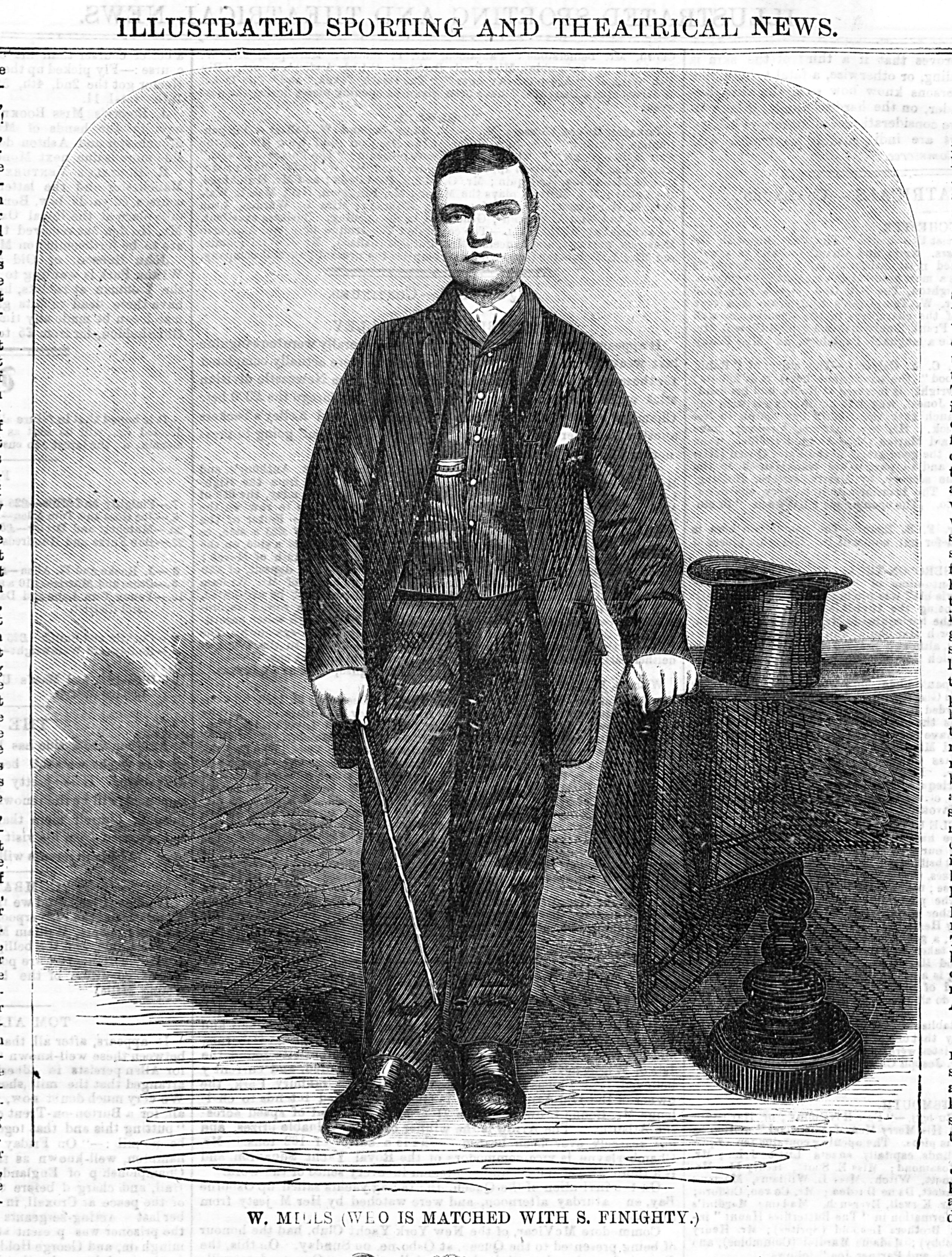
Sketch of Mills in 1867

Finighty's aforementioned match against William Mills was of special interest to the public, as "the combatants were for a long time inseparable friends, but one day a quarrel came between them, and Mills threw down the gauntlet, offering to settle their dispute by an appeal to Nature's weapons." In the lead up to the fight, The Sportsman reported that:

Finnighty, a native of London, is, we believe, about 36 years of age, stands 5ft 3in, and on Monday last weighed just 7st 8lb. It is now over fourteen years since he made his first appearance in the prize ring, during which period he has fought eight times with very good success, having only once been compelled to lower his colours, viz., to Charley Lynch, the American light-weight. For the present encounter he was taken in hand by Johnny Walker, of the Sportsman Vaults, Skelhorn-street, Liverpool, and took his breathings at Egremont, on the banks of the Mersey, under the care of Bob Smith, who brought his man to the post in the pink of condition.

Finighty was scheduled to face Mills again later that year, on 1 October 1867. The match was due to be one of a series contested on Hilbre Island that day. Owing to its accessibility at low tide, and isolation when cut off from the mainland, Hilbre was a popular venue for the then-illegal sport of prize fighting. Charles Dawson Brown, a local historian and churchwarden of St Bridget's, West Kirby, wrote that "undoubtedly there was a good deal of rough work, such as prize-fighting, cock-fighting, and such-like 'sports,' which a public-house on the island which existed till about sixty years ago would not tend to restrain." Finighty had previously faced opponents on "the well-selected and secluded island", including his drawn contest against Fox in 1864. Finighty's return to Hilbre in 1867, however, proved a cause célèbre, and was widely reported in the press of the time:

It appears that between eight and nine o'clock that morning upwards of 200 of the pugilistic fraternity of Liverpool and Birkenhead embarked in the Mersey on board the steamer Wasp, their destination being Hilbre Island, where, it was supposed, they would not be molested by the police. The matter, however, came to the knowledge of the Liverpool police, and Divisional Superintendent Ryde immediately communicated with Superintendent Hammond, of the Wirral constabulary, who at once determined, if possible, to put a stop to the disgraceful proceedings. Before starting from Hoylake, he obtained information from another source that the steamer Wasp was making for Eastham, and thinking the pugilists might make their way from there Mr. Hammond started for that locality. On getting to Eastham he discovered that he had been misinformed [...] The Wasp landed her passengers at Hilbre before one o'clock, but an attempt was made to prevent the fights taking place by constables Garside and Shore, who landed on the island in a small boat from Hoylake. Stones were thrown by the pugilists at the officers whilst they were in the boat, but notwithstanding this they succeeded in effecting a landing.

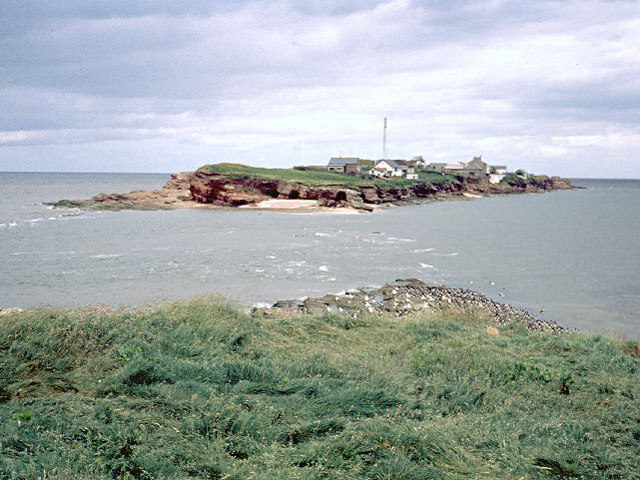
Hilbre Island

On seeing the officers on the island the fighting men coolly told them they would not be allowed to interfere with the arrangements. The two constables, under the circumstances, had no alternative but to remain quiet spectators whilst the stakes were fastened in the ground and the ring formed [...] When Superintendent Hammond reached the island the pugilists were about re-embarking on board the steamer, but with the assistance of the constables he managed to capture the two seconds (Mills and Finnighty), who were taken the same evening to Birkenhead [...] It is stated that Joe Goss, the well-known pugilist, took an active part in the proceedings at Hilbre.

After Mills and Finighty "fell into the hands of the Philistines", as a sympathetic publication put it, they were charged with 'a breach of the peace by fighting' and were bound by '£25 to keep the peace for twelve calendar months.'

== Later life and death ==
Beyond his prize fighting days, Finighty continued to compete in show and benefit matches. In 1876, when he faced Sam Thorne at Cambridge Hall in Newman Street, Finighty was described as having "approached a very advanced age," yet "his smartness was greatly admired."

Latterly, Finighty remained in Merseyside and found employment as a caterer. A journalist of The Sporting Times would later recall encountering Finighty, an old friend, at Aintree Racecourse, where the retired boxer was working on the day of the Grand National. The journalist relayed how Finighty, a "dapper little man, formerly a light-weight champion of considerable renown", was able to procure a mulligatawny soup and a hotpot for his friend (there being no hot lunch readily available), only for them to be stolen by another spectator. In doing so, he compared Finighty's accent to that of Charles Dickens' Sam Weller:

"And there," exclaimed the disgusted old pugilist, "if you'll believe me, that ruddy 'Ot Pot was hatcherly the honly one in the place, and put a one side a purpose for a friend o' the guv'nor's, until I went an' pinched it for yer! 'Ard lines all round, I call it!" said poor old Simon, looking angrily round in vain attempt to spot the rascal who had done me out of my lunch.

Despite having spent the majority of his competitive career in Liverpool, Finighty returned to London towards the end of his life. Here, on 14 November 1881, Finighty married Mary Jane Norman at St Paul's Church in Clerkenwell. Some time after the culmination of Finighty's competitive boxing career, his death was reported in The Sporting Life in May 1890:

We regret to announce the death of this feather-weight champion pugilist, who expired on Wednesday morning at three minutes to one from chest disease. Deceased was for a great many years an assistant to the firm of Keene and Brown, refreshment caterers at all the principal race meetings, and was much esteemed by his employers, and, in fact, by all with whom he came in contact. For some years he has been a great sufferer, and, despite the utmost care and attention on the part of Dr. Dingle, 20 City-road, breathed his last as above stated.
