= London Prize Ring Rules =

List of boxing rules promulgated in 1838 and revised in 1853

The London Prize Ring Rules were a list of boxing rules published in 1838 and revised in 1853. These rules were based on those drafted by England's Jack Broughton in 1743 (known as the Broughton Rules) and governed the conduct of prizefighting/ bare-knuckle boxing for over 100 years. They "introduced measures that remain in effect for professional boxing to this day, such as outlawing butting, gouging, scratching, kicking, hitting a man while down, holding the ropes, and using resin, stones or hard objects in the hands, and biting." They were later superseded by the Marquess of Queensberry Rules of 1867, which were the origin of the modern sport of boxing.

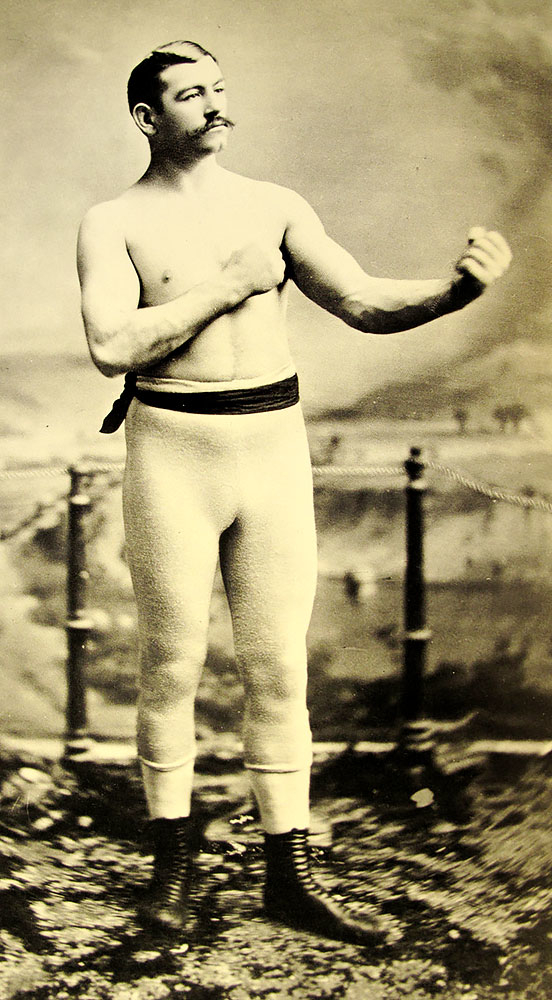
Bare-knuckle boxer John L. Sullivan.

== Scope ==
Fights under these rules were often contested with bare knuckles. The rules also allowed for a broad range of fighting including holds and throws of the opponent. Spiked shoes, within limits, were also allowed. Also included were provisions dealing with how wagers would be resolved if various events such as interference by the law, darkness, or cancellations occurred. In contrast with modern boxing rules based upon the Marquess of Queensberry Rules, a round ended with a man downed by punch or throw, whereupon he was given 30 seconds to rest and eight additional seconds to "come to scratch" or return to the centre of the ring where a "scratch line" was drawn and square off with his opponent once more. Consequently, there were no round limits to fights. When a man could not come to scratch, he would be declared loser and the fight would be brought to a halt. Fights could also end if broken up beforehand by crowd riot, police interference or chicanery, or if both men were willing to accept that the contest was a draw. While fights could have enormous numbers of rounds, the rounds in practice could be quite short with fighters pretending to go down from minor blows to take advantage of the 30-second rest period.

== Fighters ==
Famous fighters of prize ring include William "Bendigo" Thompson, Tom Cribb, Jack Broughton, James "Deaf" Burke, "Professor" Mike Donovan, Tom Allen, Samuel "Dutch Sam" Elias, John "Gentleman" Jackson, the "Benicia Boy" John Camel Heenan, Daniel Mendoza, Tom Molineaux, John "Old Smoke" Morrissey, Tom Sayers, Owen Swift, the "Trojan Giant" Paddy Ryan, Joe Goss, Simon Finighty, and James "Yankee Sullivan" Ambrose. England's last prize ring great was "gypsy" Jem Mace, and America's was John L. Sullivan—both men fought under both sets of rules, with and without gloves and are considered bridges to the modern era of boxing.

John L. Sullivan is the last fighter to have won a "world" championship under the London Prize Ring Rules in 1882 against Paddy Ryan and was the last champion to defend a title under the rules in 1889 against Jake Kilrain.

== The rules ==
=== Rules of 1838 ===
The rules of 1838 were as follows:

1. That the ring shall be made on turf, and shall be four-and-twenty feet square, formed of eight stakes and ropes, the latter extending in double lines, the uppermost line being four feet from the ground, the lower two feet from the ground. That in the centre of the ring a mark be formed, to be termed a scratch; and that at two opposite corners, as may be selected, spaces be inclosed [sic] by other marks sufficiently large for the reception of the seconds and bottle holders, to be entitled "the corners".
2. That each man shall be attended to the ring by a second and a bottle-holder, the former provided with a sponge, and the latter with a bottle of water. That the combatants, on shaking hands, shall retire until the seconds of each have tossed for choice of position; which adjusted, the winner shall choose his corner according to the state of the wind or sun, and conduct his man thereto, the loser taking the opposite corner.
3. That each man shall be provided with a handkerchief of a colour suitable to his own fancy, and that the seconds proceed to entwine these handkerchiefs at the upper end of one of the centre stakes. That these handkerchiefs shall be called "the colours"; and that the winner of the battle at its conclusion shall be entitled to their possession, as the trophy of victory.
4. That two umpires shall then be chosen by the seconds to watch the progress of the battle, and take exception to any breach of the rules hereafter stated. That a referee shall be chosen by the umpires, to whom all disputes shall be referred; and that the decision of this referee, whatever it may be, shall be final and strictly binding on all parties, whether as to the matter in dispute or the issue of the battle. That the umpires shall be provided with a watch, for the purpose of calling time; and that they mutually agree upon which this duty shall devolve, the call of that umpire only to be attended to, and no other person whatever to interfere in calling time. That the referee shall withhold all opinion till appealed to by the umpires, and that the umpires strictly abide by his decision without dispute.
5. That on the men being stripped, it shall be the duty of the seconds to examine their shoes and drawers, and if any objection arises either as to insertion of improper spikes in the former, or substances in the latter, they shall appeal to their umpires, who, with the concurrence of the referee, shall direct if any and what alteration shall be made.
6. That both men being ready, each man shall be conducted to that side of the scratch next his corner previously chosen; and the seconds on the one side, and the men on the other, having shaken hands, the former shall immediately return to their corners, and there remain within the prescribed marks till the round be finished, on no pretence whatever approaching their principals during the round, on penalty of losing the battle.
7. That at the conclusion of the round, when one or both of the men are down, the seconds and bottle-holders shall step forward and carry or conduct their principal to his corner, there affording him the necessary assistance, and that no person whatever be permitted to interfere in this duty.
8. That at the expiration of thirty seconds (unless otherwise agreed upon) the umpire appointed shall cry "time", upon which each man shall rise from the knee of his bottle-holder and walk to his own side of the scratch unaided, the seconds and bottle-holders remaining at their corners; and that either man failing so to be at the scratch within eight seconds, shall be deemed to have lost the battle.
9. That on no consideration whatever shall any person be permitted to enter the ring during the battle, or till it shall have become concluded; and that in the event of such unfair practice, or the ropes and stakes being disturbed or removed, it shall be in the power of the umpires and referee to award the victory to that man who in their honest opinion shall have the best of the contest.
10. That the seconds and bottle-holders shall not interfere, advise, or direct the adversary of their principal, and shall refrain from all offensive er irritating expressions, in all respects conducting them selves with order and decorum, and confine themselves to the diligent and careful discharge of their duties to their principals.
11. That in picking up their men, should the seconds or bottle-holders wilfully [sic] injure the antagonist of their principals, he shall be deemed to have forfeited the battle, on the decision of the umpires or referee.
12. That it shall be "a fair stand-up fight", and if either man shall wilfully [sic] throw himself down without receiving a blow, he shall be deemed to have lost the battle; but that this rule shall not apply to a man who in a close slips down from the grasp of his opponent to avoid punishment.
13. That butting with the head shall be deemed foul, and the party resorting to this practice shall be deemed to have lost the battle.
14. That a blow struck when a man is thrown or down, shall be deemed foul. That a man with one knee and one hand on the ground, or with both knees on the ground, shall be deemed down; and a blow given in either of these positions shall be considered foul, providing always, that when in such position, the man so down shall not himself strike or attempt to strike.
15. That a blow struck below the waistband shall be deemed foul, and that, in a close, seizing an antagonist below the waist, by the thigh or otherwise, shall be deemed foul.
16. That all attempts to inflict injury by gouging, or tearing the flesh with the fingers or nails, and biting shall be deemed foul.
17. That kicking, or deliberately falling on an antagonist with the knees or otherwise when down, shall be deemed foul.
18. That all bets shall be paid as the battle-money after a fight is awarded.
19. That no person on any pretence whatever shall be permitted to approach nearer the ring than ten feet, with the exception of the umpires and referee, and the persons appointed to take charge of the water or other refreshment for the combatants, who shall take their seats close to the corners selected by the seconds.
20. That due notice shall be given by the stake-holder of the day and place where the battle-money is to be given up, and that he be exonerated from all responsibility upon obeying the direction of the umpires and referee; and that all parties be strictly bound by these rules; and that in future all articles of agreement for a contest be entered into with a strict and willing adherence to the letter and spirit of these rules, and without reserve or equivocation.
21. That in the event of magisterial interference, it shall be the duty of the umpires and referee to name the time and place for the next meeting, if possible on the same day.
22. That should the event not be decided on the day named, all bets shall be deemed void, unless again declared on by mutual agreement: but that the battle-money shall remain in the hands of the stake-holder till fairly won or lost by a fight, unless each party shall agreе to withdraw his stake.
23. That all stage fights be as nearly as possible in conformity with the foregoing rules.

=== Rules of 1853 ===
The rules of 1853 were as follows:

1. That the ring shall be made on turf, and shall be four-and-twenty feet square, formed of eight stakes and ropes, the latter extending in double lines, the uppermost line being four feet from the ground, and the lower two feet from the ground. That in the centre of the ring a mark be formed, to be termed a scratch; and that at two opposite corners, as may be selected, spaces be enclosed by other marks sufficiently large for the reception of the seconds and bottle-holders, to be entitled "the corners".
2. That each man shall be attended to the ring by a second and a bottle-holder, the former provided with a sponge and the latter with a bottle of water. That the combatants, on shaking hands, shall retire until the seconds of each have tossed for choice of position, which adjusted, the winner shall choose his corner according to the state of the wind or sun, and conduct his man thereto, the loser taking the opposite corner.
3. That each man shall be provided with a handkerchief of a colour suitable to his own fancy, and that the seconds proceed to entwine these handkerchiefs at the upper end of one of the center stakes. That these handkerchiefs shall be called "the colours"; and that the winner of the battle at its conclusion shall be entitled to their possession, as the trophy of victory.
4. That two umpires shall be chosen by the seconds or backers to watch the progress of the battle, and take exception to any breach of the rules hereafter stated. That a referee shall be chosen by the umpires, unless otherwise agreed on, to whom all disputes shall be referred; and that the decision of this referee, whatever it may be, shall be final and strictly binding on all parties, whether as to the matter in dispute or the issue of the battle. That the umpires shall be provided with a watch, for the purpose of calling time; and that they mutually agree upon which this duty shall devolve, the call of that umpire only to be attended to, and no other person whatever to interfere in calling time. That the referee shall withhold all opinion till appealed to by the umpires, and that the umpires strictly abide by his decision without dispute.
5. That on the men being stripped, it shall be the duty of the seconds to examine their drawers, and if any objection arise as to insertion of improper substances therein, they shall appeal to their umpires, who, with the concurrence of the referee, shall direct what alterations shall be made.
6. That in future no spikes be used in fighting boots except those authorised by the Pugilistic Benevolent Association, which shall not exceed three-eights of an inch from the sole of the boot, and shall not be less than one-eight of an inch broad at the point; and, it shall be in the power of the referee to alter, or file in any way he pleases, spikes which shall not accord with the above dimensions, even to filing them away altogether.
7. That both men being ready, each man shall be conducted to that side of the scratch next his corner previously chosen; and the seconds on the one side and the men on the other, having shaken hands, the former shall immediately return to their corners, and there remain within the prescribed marks till the round be finished, on no pretence whatever approaching their principals during the round, under penalty of 5s. for each offence, at the option of the referee. The penalty, which will be strictly enforced, to go to the funds of the Association. The principal to be responsible for every fine inflicted on his second.
8. That at the conclusion of the round, when one or both of the men shall be down, the seconds and bottle-holders shall step forward and carry or conduct their principal to his corner, there affording him the necessary assistance, and no person whatever be permitted to interfere with this duty.
9. That at the expiration of thirty seconds (unless otherwise agreed upon) the umpire appointed shall cry "Time", upon which each man shall rise from the knee of his bottle-holder and walk to his own side of the scratch unaided, the seconds and the bottle-holders remaining at their corner; and that either man failing so to be at the scratch within eight seconds, shall be deemed to have lost the battle.
10. That on no consideration whatever shall any person be permitted to enter the ring during the battle, nor till it shall have been concluded; and that in the event of such unfair practice, or the ropes and stakes being disturbed or removed, it shall be in the power of the referee to award the victory to that man who in his honest opinion shall have the best of the contest.
11. That the seconds and bottle-holders shall not interfere, advise, or direct the adversary of their principal, and shall refrain from all offensive and irritating expressions, in all respects conducting themselves with order and decorum, and confine themselves to the diligent and careful discharge of their duties to their principals.
12. That in picking up their men, should the seconds or bottle-holders wilfully injure the antagonist of their principal, the latter shall be deemed to have forfeited the battle on the decision of the referee.
13. That it shall be "a fair stand-up fight", and if either man shall wilfully throw himself down without receiving a blow, whether blows shall have previously been exchanged or not, he shall be deemed to have lost the battle; but that this rule shall not apply to a man who in a close slips down from the grasp of his opponent to avoid punishment, or from obvious accident or weakness.
14. That butting with the head shall be deemed foul, and the party resorting to this practice shall be deemed to have lost the battle.
15. That a blow struck when a man is thrown or down, shall be deemed foul. That a man with one knee and one hand on the ground, or with both knees on the ground, shall be deemed down; and a blow given in either of those positions shall be considered foul, providing always, that when in such position, the man so down shall not himself strike or attempt to strike.
16. That a blow struck below the waistband shall be deemed foul, and that, in a close, seizing an antagonist below the waist, by the thigh, or otherwise, shall be deemed foul.
17. That all attempts to inflict injury by gouging, or tearing the flesh with the fingers or nails, and biting, shall be deemed foul.
18. That kicking, or deliberately falling on an antagonist, with the knees or otherwise when down, shall be deemed a foul.
19. That all bets shall be paid as the battle-money, after a fight, is awarded.
20. That no person, on any pretence whatever, shall be permitted to approach nearer the ring than ten feet, with the exception of the umpires and referee, and the persons appointed to take charge of the water or other refreshment for the combatants, who shall take their seats close to the corners selected by the seconds.
21. That due notice shall be given by the stakeholder of the day and place where the battle-money is to be given up, and that he be exonerated from all responsibility upon obeying the direction of the referee; and that all parties be strictly bound by these rules; and that in future all articles of agreement for a contest be entered into with a strict and willing adherence to the letter and spirit of these rules.
22. That in the event of magisterial or other interference, or in case of darkness coming on, the referee shall have the power to name the time and place for the next meeting, if possible, on the same day, or as soon after as may be.
23. That should the fight not be decided on the day, all bets, instead of being drawn, shall be put together and divided, unless the fight shall be resumed the same week, between Sunday and Sunday, in which case the bets shall stand and be decided by the event. That where the day named in the articles for a fight to come off is altered to another day in the same week, the bets shall stand. The battle-money shall remain in the hands of the stakeholder until fairly won or lost by a fight, unless a draw be mutually agreed upon.
24. That any pugilist voluntarily quitting the ring previous to the deliberate judgement of the referee being obtained, shall be deemed to have lost the fight.
25. That on an objection being made by the seconds or umpire, the men shall retire to their corners, and there remain until the decision of the appointed authorities shall be obtained; that if pronounced "foul", the battle shall be at an end, but if "fair", "time" shall be called by the party appointed, and the man absent from the scratch in eight seconds after shall be deemed to have lost the fight. The decision in all cases to be given promptly and irrevocably, for which purpose the umpires and the referee should be invariably close together.
26. That if in a rally at the ropes a man steps outside the ring, to avoid his antagonist or escape punishment, he shall forfeit the battle.
27. That the use of hard substances, such as stones, or sticks, or of resin, in the hand during the battle shall be deemed foul, and that on the requisition of the seconds, of either man, the accused shall open his hands for the examination of the referee.
28. That where a man shall have his antagonist across the ropes in such a position as to be helpless, and to endanger his life by strangulation or apoplexy, it shall be in the power of the referee to direct the seconds to take their man away, and thus conclude the round, and that the man or his seconds refusing to obey the direction of the referee, shall be deemed the loser.
29. That all stage fights be as nearly as possible in conformity with the foregoing rules.
