= Finnerty =

Finnerty is a surname of Irish origin. It literally means "Fair snow".

== Notable people with the surname ==
- Anthony Finnerty, Gaelic footballer for Mayo and father of Robert
- Collin Finnerty, one of the three falsely accused students in the 2006 Duke University lacrosse case
- Cullen Finnerty (1982–2013), Grand Valley State University football team quarterback
- Dan Finnerty, American actor
- Isobel Finnerty, Canadian senator
- John J. Finnerty (1879–1958), American politician and barber
- Maurice P. Finnerty, mayor of Penticton, British Columbia from 1962 to 1967
- Pat Finnerty, American musician
- Robert Finnerty, Gaelic footballer for Galway and son of Anthony
- Simon Finnerty, bare-knuckle boxer

== Fictional characters ==
- Finnerty, a family on the American television series Grounded for Life
- Kevin Finnerty, a dream alias of Tony Soprano on the HBO television series The Sopranos
- Ed Finnerty, in the 1952 Kurt Vonnegut novel Player Piano
