= Dominick McCaffrey =

American boxer

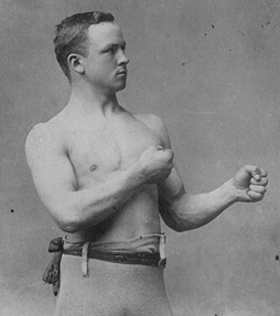

Personal information
- Nationality: American
- Born: Dominick McCaffrey; September 24, 1863 Pittsburgh, Pennsylvania
- Died: December 29, 1926 (aged 63)
- Weight: Middleweight

Boxing career

Dominick McCaffrey (born September 24, 1863 in Pittsburgh, Pennsylvania – December 29, 1926) was an American boxer of Irish descent.

McCaffrey was a popular boxer during his time, often noted for fighting much larger heavyweights. On August 29, 1885, he fought for the inaugural gloved world heavyweight title under the Marquess of Queensberry Rules against John L. Sullivan. The fight took place just outside of Cincinnati, Ohio, in Chester Park. Originally scheduled for six rounds, McCaffrey and Sullivan accidentally fought a seventh. Regardless, McCaffrey lost on points, thus granting Sullivan what is commonly regarded as the first world heavyweight title in modern boxing.

Following retirement, McCaffrey became the boxing instructor at the Manhattan Athletic Club in New York, New York. McCaffrey was managed by Billy O'Brien, a well known sports authority and one time pugilist in his own right

== See also ==
- List of bare-knuckle boxers
