= John J. Finnerty =

American politician

John J. Finnerty (May 14, 1879 – November 25, 1958) was an American barber and politician.

Born in Philadelphia, Pennsylvania, Finnerty was a barber. He served in the Pennsylvania House of Representatives from 1935 to 1937 and from 1939 to 1945. He was a Democrat. He then served as a deputy United States Marshal. Finnerty died in Philadelphia, Pennsylvania.
