= A River Runs Through It =

A River Runs Through It may refer to:

- A River Runs Through It (novel), or A River Runs Through It and Other Stories, a collection of stories by Norman Maclean
- A River Runs Through It (film), 1992, based on the book
