= Paddy Ryan =

American boxer (1853–1900)

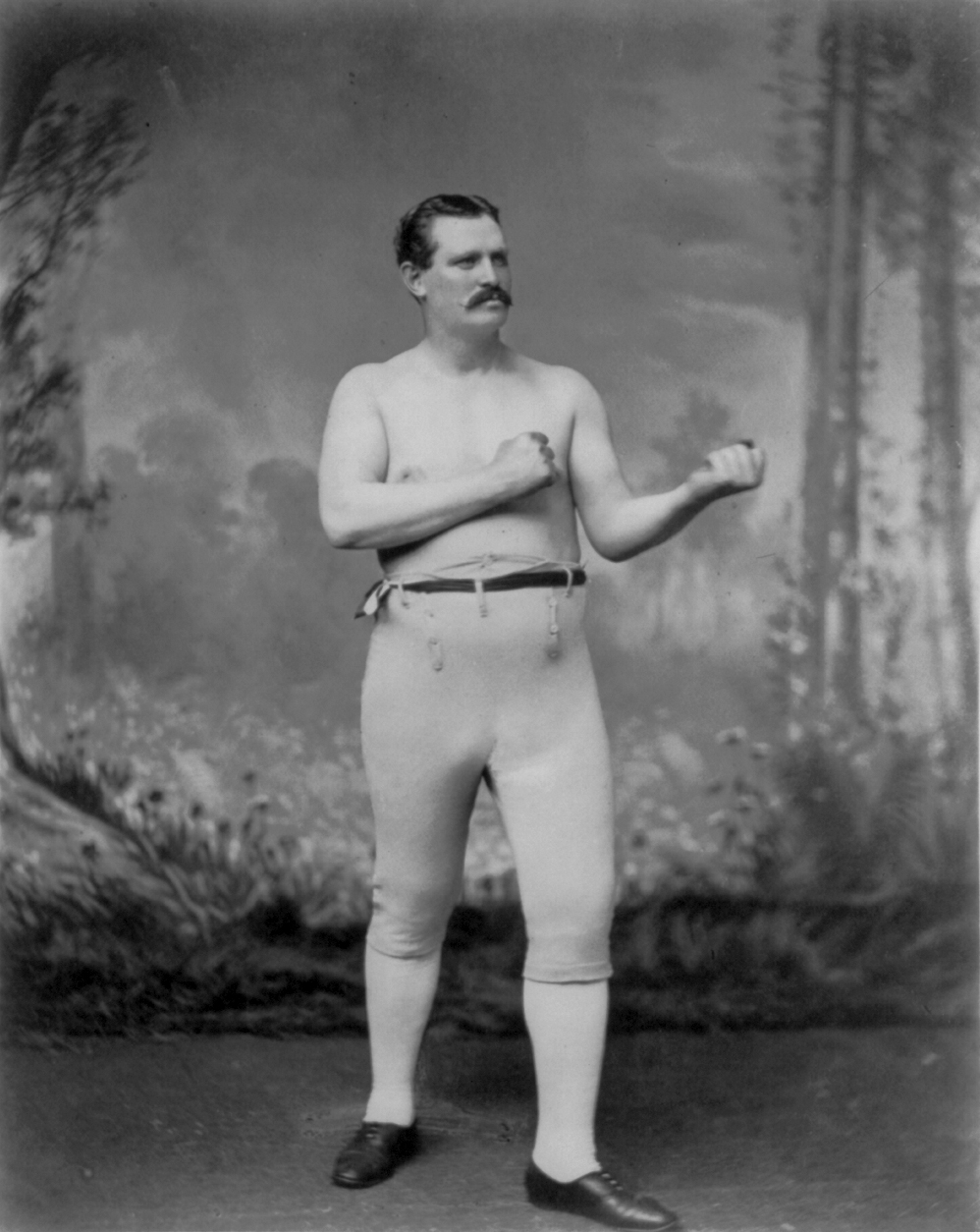
- Paddy Ryan, 1887

Personal information
- Nickname: The Trojan Giant
- Nationality: (United States) Irish American; Settled in America as a youth
- Born: Patrick Ryan; 15 March 1853 Thurles, County Tipperary, Ireland; Settled in Troy, NY. by 1872; Lived in San Francisco, 1886-8
- Died: 14 December 1900 (aged 47) Green Island, New York, near Troy
- Height: 5 ft 11 in (1.80 m)
- Weight: Heavyweight

Boxing career
- Stance: Orthodox (right-handed); Used London Prize Ring Rules 1877-86

Boxing record
- Total fights: 10; Major fights only Exhibitions excluded
- Wins: 2
- Win by KO: 1
- Losses: 7
- Draws: 3

Patrick Ryan (15 March 1853 – 14 December 1900) was an Irish American boxer, and became the bare-knuckle American heavyweight champion on 30 May 1880, after he won the title from Joe Goss. He retained the title until losing it to the exceptional John L. Sullivan on 7 February 1882.

Ryan fought only ten major bouts, but as many as twenty-five exhibitions including many against Sullivan in his late career. Exhibitions brought him income, but with fewer rounds and less risk.

== Early life and career ==
Ryan was born in Thurles, County Tipperary, Ireland on 14 March 1853. After moving to America, he lived in the Troy, New York area. Consequently, he was nicknamed the "Trojan Giant". He may have been apprenticed to a blacksmith. Ryan was working as a blacksmith by the time he lived in Troy. As a stout youth, Ryan worked on the construction of the Erie Canal before pursuing his boxing career. After opening a Troy saloon in 1874, he caught the attention of the athletic director of Rensselaer Polytechnic Institute, Jim Killoran. Killoran saw Ryan dealing with troublemakers and drunks at the saloon and decided to train him as a prizefighter.

Ryan's first match was in 1877. He was as much an all-around fighter, grappler or wrestler as he was a boxer. Under the London Prize Ring rules of that era, several of his wrestling moves could be used in the ring. Some boxing historians believe he was a better wrestler than boxer, and would have benefited from more specialized boxing training.

== American heavyweight champion, 1880 ==
Jem Mace

Former heavyweight champion Jem Mace had been inactive for many years, and was believed to have vacated the title, making it open for contention. According to several sources, the fight with Goss was Ryan's first real prize fight, though he had done combat before to decide disputes, sometimes with established boxers. On their arrival to the working capital of Pennsylvania, the Mayor of Pittsburgh made it clear to both parties that the illegal fight would not take place in his city, so the combatants moved to a more remote spot in West Virginia.

In the most significant win of his career, Ryan defeated bare-knuckle heavyweight championship Joe Goss on 30 May 1880, in Collier's Station, West Virginia. In the 87th round, Goss was unable to continue and the contest was stopped after 90 minutes. Ryan's final blow was a right that knocked out Goss. Up until that time, the fight was tight and well-contested. Goss's seconds claimed a foul in the 87th, and with him being unable to continue, the judges awarded the bout to Ryan. His opponent appeared winded, but Ryan was terribly battered around the face and body. Ryan was nearly twenty pounds heavier and nearly six inches taller than Goss, a discrepancy which would have never been allowed in today's boxing, and may have made the difference in the match.

=== Exhibitions, 1881 ===
In 1881, Ryan fought eight exhibition bouts primarily in the New York area, in which he fought Goss again on 18 May, and then fought John Dwyer on 2 July. He later faced Captain James Dalton on 1 October, a well-known regional opponent.

== Losing American heavyweight title, 1882 ==
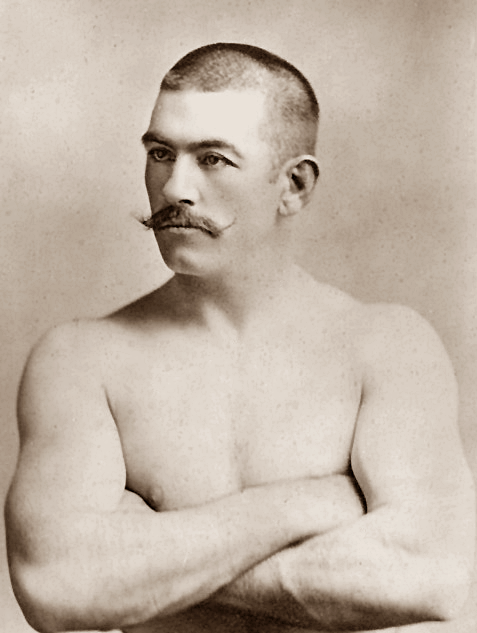
Champion John L. Sullivan

John L. Sullivan and Ryan arrived in New Orleans on 6 February 1882, to determine who would hold the American heavyweight championship. Louisiana Governor Samuel D. McEnery had declared the fight illegal, so Sullivan, Ryan and their respective parties moved the fight to Mississippi.

Governor Lowry of Mississippi issued a proclamation ordering all local sheriffs to do whatever was necessary to stop the illegal fight. The next day, the fight crowd moved to Mississippi City, Mississippi where a ring was set up in front of the Barnes Hotel in a grove of live oaks. The local sheriff was not present, and the fight took place in Mississippi anyway, where there was actually no written statute that outlawed boxing. Sullivan, the proud Irishman, wore green pants and stockings, to Ryan's white pants and stockings with spiked boxing shoes. The fight was to be a bare-knuckle contest governed by the London Prize Ring Rules, and fought on dirt in a 24-foot ring. The championship contest may well have been Sullivan's first bare-knuckle bout. Each side put up $2,500 with an additional $1,000 put up for each side. Richard K. Fox, owner of the boxing magazine Police Gazette, was the backer for Ryan. James Keenan, of Boston, was the backer for Sullivan. This made the winner's stake $3,500, one of the larger American purses to date. There were about 2,000 spectators present.

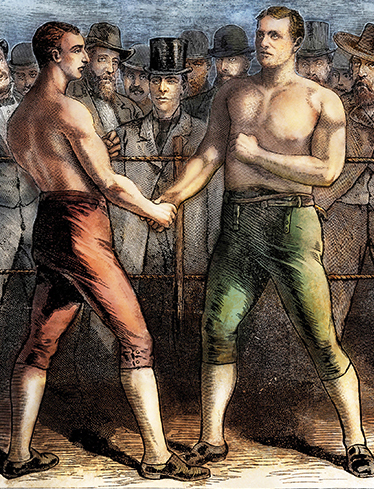
Ryan (left) and Sullivan shake hands at scratch line

Ryan was six years older, at least ten pounds lighter, but an inch or two taller, which gifted him with greater reach. His advantage in reach was apparently offset by less sophisticated defensive skills and speed, and somewhat inferior conditioning. Sullivan's seconds were Billy Madden and Joe Goss. His umpire was James Shannon. There was a dispute over the selection of a referee which was finally settled by the appointment of two referees: Alexander Brewster of New Orleans and Jack Hardy of Vicksburg. Considered ancient for a modern boxer, the thirty-seven year old Ryan knew he was battered from his long career and admitted, "I meant to have retired before, but you know how it is. When you whip somebody there is always somebody else turning up that wants to try his hand, and that’s the way I am caught this time."

Following an old tradition, Sullivan threw his hat in the ring at 11:45 am. Ryan came into the ring at 11:57 with the crowd estimated at 5,000. The men then approached the scratch line in the center of the ring and shook hands.

The New York Herald wrote that from the first round, Sullivan appeared superior. His rights were devastating and Ryan had difficulty recovering from them. Early in the fight, Sullivan decked Ryan with his famed right. Countering quickly, the reigning champion wrestled Sullivan to the ground to end round two. But the exertion of the maneuver sapped Ryan's energy and he found himself thrown about in clinches thereafter, despite his wrestling background. After nine rounds and only twenty minutes, Sullivan knocked Ryan out with a final right-handed punch which landed under Ryan's left ear. Ryan left the ring with his jaw visibly swollen. This was the last time the heavyweight championship would be won in a bare knuckle fight in history. Ryan fought Sullivan on many occasions afterward, but never won. After the bout, Sullivan was a frequent sparring partner of Ryan's. Sullivan's fame and his acceptance among both American aristocracy and the lower classes was unique and new in the boxing world, and would help both boxers draw large crowds to the exhibitions they would later stage in the Northeast.

In Ryan's era, boxing titles were informal, as there were no globally recognized sanctioning bodies to bestow legitimacy to a world title. Some sources refer to him as the "Heavyweight Champion of America" while others call him a world champion. To a large extent, he was recognized as the world champion of boxing while he held the title, as heavyweights held reign over other weight classes at the time, and had larger followings.

=== Meeting fewer boxing opponents, 1883-1886 ===
Ryan was less active in boxing in 1883 when he knocked out Montana champion Jack Waite in a three-round exhibition on 21 October. The results of several fights he scheduled that year failed to appear in the press. He continued to meet few opponents in 1884–1885, though on 19 January 1885, Ryan fought a no contest bout with Sullivan at New York's Madison Square Garden. Some sources report Ryan lost, but in any event, police intervened in the first round and stopped the fight.

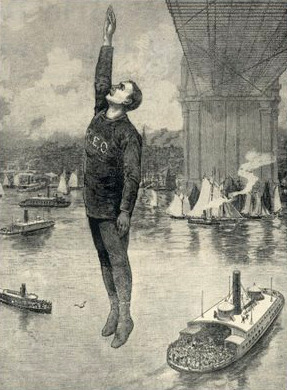
Odlum jumps from the bridge

Ryan was one of a party of gentlemen entertained by Robert Emmet Odlum, brother of women's rights activist Charlotte Smith, on the morning of 19 May 1885, the day he jumped from the Brooklyn Bridge and was killed, though his intention was merely to prove that the jump could be made safely. Ryan assisted in unsuccessful resuscitation efforts.

Ryan fought a two-round draw with Frank Glover on 13 September 1886, in Chicago. Ryan fought at 210, above his normal fighting weight and was described as too "fleshy" by a Wisconsin paper. The referees split on a decision, so a draw was called, when a dozen police officers intervened and stopped the fight in the second round. The bout was fought on a boat in the rain using the London Prize Rules and close to 1,500 spectators had huddled nearby to see the match.

The new Queensberry rules banned all forms of wrestling, which may have hurt Ryan in his next fight against the superior scientific boxer, Jack McCaulliffe. Queensberry's fixed three minute rounds and longer one minute rest interval helped boxers regain their strength and sustain more energy, and a fixed ten second count allowed an injured boxer some time to recover as well. A prohibition on hitting an opponent in the back of the head or in their back added a modicum of safety to the more lax and dangerous London Prize Ring Rules.

=== Late career and exhibitions, 1886-1897 ===
Ryan lived for a few years in San Francisco in the late '80s. On 13 November 1886, before a crowd of 8,000, Ryan had a non-title rematch with Sullivan, at the Mechanic's Pavilion in San Francisco, California; he lost by knockout in a 3-round contest. He was down in the first from a short arm to the chin, though both boxers appeared to have traded some solid blows to the face before the round ended. Ryan was down again in the second, before a second knockdown in the third ended the fight. The fight was fought with gloves and adhered to the Marquess of Queensberry Rules, first published in 1867.

Ryan lost to Joe McAuliffe, who knocked him out in three rounds on 23 December 1887, in San Francisco. The fight was fought with gloves using the new Queensberry Rules, which necessitated their use. McCauliffe had a thirteen-year age advantage, and was known as a powerful man and a strong puncher. In a fight not fought to the satisfaction of the spectators, Ryan was down twice in the first round and McCauliffe balked at hitting a groggy Ryan in the second. In the opening of the fourth round, Ryan's seconds threw up the sponge, ending the bout.

Ryan was arrested on a charge of grand larceny of $100 on 21 21 February 1888, in San Francisco, where he was still living at the time, though once the charge was found to be fraudulent, he was quickly acquitted and released.

Several newspapers reported that Ryan lost to John Donner on 4 May 1888, in Duluth, Minnesota, by knockout, though a reliable source reported the boxer was not Paddy Ryan the ex-champion and that Ryan was living in San Francisco.

Ryan performed in a series of lucrative and well-attended exhibitions with Sullivan, primarily in New England, from 1891 to 1897, before retiring from boxing. In their three-round exhibition in March 1896, in Visalia, California, 230 miles southeast of San Francisco, Sullivan was described as "beefy and far from looking like a pugilist, while Ryan was said to still be in good form."

On 5 March 1899, Ryan refereed the Alt Allen vs. Fred Wyatt match in Plattsburgh, New York.

== Death ==
Returning to New York after boxing retirement, he refereed a few fights and worked in Albany.

In his last months, Ryan lost his speech and suffered from Bright's disease. A subscription was started for his benefit, contributed to generously by Sullivan, and a benefit in his honor was given at Madison Square Garden. Ryan died from his disease on 14 December 1900 in Green Island, New York, aged 49. He was buried in St. Mary's Cemetery. He was survived by a daughter.

Ryan was elected to The Ring magazine's Hall of Fame in 1973.

== Selected fights ==
1 Win, 4 Losses, 1 Draw
Result	Opponent(s)	Date	Location	Duration	Notes
Win	Joe Goss	30 May 1880	Collier's Station, West Virginia	87 Rounds	Won Heavyweight Championship of America
Loss	John L. Sullivan	7 February 1882	Mississippi City, Mississippi	9 Rounds	Lost Heavyweight Championship of America
Loss	John L. Sullivan	19 January 1885	New York, New York	1 Round	Police intervened
Draw	Frank Glover	13 September 1886	Chicago, Illinois	2 Round	London Rules; Police intervened
Loss	John L. Sullivan	13 November 1886	San Francisco, California	3 Rounds	Was knocked out
Loss	Joe McCauliffe	23 December 1887	San Francisco, California	Queensbury Rules; 3 Rounds	Was knocked out
Loss	John P. Donner	4 May 1888	San Francisco, California	3 Rounds	Was knocked out

Awards and achievements
Preceded by Joe Goss	Heavyweight Bare-knuckle Boxing Champion; 30 May 1880–7 February 1882	Succeeded by John L. Sullivan
