= The Great John L. =

1945 film by Frank Tuttle

- Theatrical release poster
- Directed by: Frank Tuttle
- Screenplay by: James Edward Grant
- Produced by: James Edward Grant; Frank R. Mastroly
- Starring: Linda Darnell; Barbara Britton; Greg McClure; Otto Kruger; Wallace Ford; George Mathews
- Cinematography: James Van Trees
- Edited by: Ted Bellinger
- Music by: Victor Young
- Production company: Bing Crosby Productions
- Distributed by: United Artists
- Release date: May 25, 1945
- Running time: 96 minutes
- Country: United States
- Language: English
- Budget: approx $900,000

The Great John L. is a 1945 American biographical drama film directed by Frank Tuttle and written by James Edward Grant. The film stars Linda Darnell, Barbara Britton, Greg McClure, Otto Kruger, Wallace Ford and George Mathews. The film was released on May 25, 1945, by United Artists.

== Plot ==
In 1880, when bareknuckle fighting is still condoned, John L. Sullivan chooses boxing over baseball and becomes known as "the Boston Strong Boy" after his victory over established prizefighter John Flood.

Sullivan's sweetheart, Kathy Harkness, refuses his marriage proposal, unhappy about how he has chosen to make a living. After he wins the heavyweight championship, Sullivan buys a tavern and begins drinking too much of his own product. He also meets New York singer Anne Livingston, marrying her on the rebound from Kathy and traveling the world, meeting British royalty while fighting abroad.

Sullivan's ego and alcoholism grow out of control. Anne realizes he still loves Kathy and leaves him, but Kathy still disapproves of his life. Sullivan is defeated by "Gentleman" Jim Corbett, loses the heavyweight crown and also loses his saloon, due to growing debts. Anne, too, becomes bankrupt as well as terminally ill. Sullivan vows to turn his life around, speaking on behalf of temperance unions as Kathy sees a glimmer of hope for their future.

== Cast ==
- Linda Darnell as Anne Livingstone
- Barbara Britton as Kathy Harkness
- Greg McClure as John L. Sullivan
- Otto Kruger as Richard Martin
- Wallace Ford as McManus
- George Mathews as John Flood
- Robert Barrat as Billy Muldoon
- J. M. Kerrigan as Father O'Malley
- Joel Friedkin as Michael Sullivan
- Simon Semenoff as Mons. Claire
- Harry Crocker as Arthur Brisbane
- Rory Calhoun as James J. 'Gentleman Jim' Corbett
- Fritz Feld as Claire's Manager
- Lee Sullivan as Mickey Steele
- Chester Conklin as Haggerty (uncredited)
- Frank Darien as Fight Speculator (uncredited)
- Leslie Denison as King Edward VII (uncredited)
- Brandon Hurst as Valet (uncredited)

== Critical response ==
"A curious mixture of excitement and tedious drama make up the picture The Great John L, which arrived at the Globe on Saturday, a promising augury for the newly launched Bing Crosby Productions ... It is only after he loses to Corbett and his wife dies that “Honest John” marries his boyhood sweetheart and turns to the better life. But the process is overlong and occasionally boring." - The New York Times.

"In his first independent production, Bing Crosby comes out with both fists swinging through a dramatization of the life of John L. Sullivan. When the pic is released, it should be a great day all around, for the Irish, as well as for the houses that run it. It’s straight boff from start to finish."

== See also ==
- List of boxing films
