= Greg McClure =

Greg McClure (born Dale Easton; 1915–2012) was an American actor. His most notable film role was as John L. Sullivan in The Great John L. (1945) but in most of his twenty films he had only bit parts, often as a soldier or a boxer.

McClure was born Dale Easton in Atlanta, the son of Paul Barksdale D'or, attorney, stepson of Walter Easton, a writer for pulp magazines, uncle of Larry R Miller, retired physicist. He grew up in Oakland after the family moved there when he was 3 years old. Bing Crosby changed his name when he was cast in the Sullivan film.

He signed a contract with Golden Gate Pictures, for whom he was meant to appear in Pillar Mountain (based on a book by Max Brand) and My Dog Shep.

McClure married Marjorie Hoover, his high school sweetheart, and they had a daughter.
