= Joe Goss =

British boxer (1837–1885)

Personal information
- Nationality: British
- Born: Joseph Goss; 5 November 1838 Northampton, England
- Died: 24 March 1885 (aged 46) Boston, United States
- Height: 5 ft 8 in (1.73 m)
- Weight: Ranged from150 lb (68 kg); To 165 lb (75 kg); Middleweight-Heavyweight

Boxing career
- Stance: Orthodox

Boxing record
- Total fights: 21
- Wins: 11
- Losses: 4
- Draws: 5
- No contests: 1

Joseph Goss (1838-1885) was an English bare knuckle boxer. He emigranted to the United States of America in 1867. After defeating Tom Allen in Boone County, Kentucky, he held the American and what many boxing historians now consider the World Heavyweight boxing championship from 7 September 1876 to 30 May 1880. Although he rarely scaled more than 160 pounds, the clever and aggressive Goss routinely fought men both bigger and heavier than himself.

== Early life and career ==
Goss was born on 6 November 1837 in Northampton, Northamptonshire, East Midlands, England. His father was a shoemaker, and brought his son up in that trade. By 18, Goss was fighting exhibitions at county fairs and beginning to win a reputation as a talented hard hitting boxer. At the age of twenty, Goss began his career with a 90-minute victory over George Ayers at London's Brompton Bushes for the modest sum of £5. Goss then defeated Jack Rooke in a marathon 64 rounds taking an hour and forty-four minutes on 20 September 1859 in Leaseford, England.

On 17 July 1860, Goss defeated Bodger Crutchley in 120 rounds lasting 3 hours and 20 minutes for a split of £100. He defeated Bill Ryall convincingly, first on 24 September 1861 in 37 rounds requiring 2 hours and 50 minutes for £50. In their second meeting, on 11 February 1862, Goss, with astonishing persistence, fought with one hand from a dislocated shoulder for $100, drawing with Ryall in 36 rounds, requiring 3 hours and eighteen minutes.

== English Middleweight champion, 1862 ==
In an important bout on 25 November 1862 for £25 a side, Goss defeated John "Posh" Price for the Middleweight championship of England in 66 rounds, at Stonebridge. The fight had been moved once due to pressures from police. The first hour of fighting appeared fairly equal but afterwards Price appeared visibly exhausted. After one hour 40 minutes and a hard-fought 66 rounds, Price went down without a blow, unable to continue, and his seconds threw in the sponge signalling an end to the bout in what would be considered a technical knockout today. Goss claimed the middleweight championship of England. Both men fought at 10 Stones, 12 pounds or roughly 69 kg (152 lbs.) catchweight, below Goss's future fighting weight and what would now be considered below middleweight range.

Goss lost one of the few matches of his early career when Hall of Famer Jem Mace defeated him in 19 rounds (1 hour and 55 minutes) near London on 1 September 1863 for the exceptional purse of £500 a side. The title bout was for the middleweight championship of England. Mace won the bout, Goss being "knocked out of time", or down and unable to continue the fight. Eluding the police, the large crowd had to be moved from two previous locations to Plumstead Marshes, Southeast of London.

According to the Irish Post Goss lost to future American Champion Joe Coburn in a buildup to his fight with Jem Mace, which was to take place in Piercetown, Tipperary, Ireland in 1864.

Goss fought a 1-round draw against Jem Mace on 24 May 1866 near Meopham, Kent that was considered to be for the English Heavyweight Championship. Very few blows were struck, when after 1 hour, the referee leapt into the ring and facing the laughter and hisses of the crowd, declared the fight a "drawn battle". Mace later claimed he had sprained an ankle severely a few nights before.

Mace with right to Goss's eye, 1866

In a major loss, Jem Mace defeated Goss on 6 August 1866 in 21 rounds near a spot off the Thames known as Long Reach between Purfleet and Gravesend in what boxing historians concur was an attempt at the English Heavyweight Championship. By one reliable account, the ring used was only sixteen feet square, eight square feet shorter than the regulation size. Mace was said to still be suffering from a strained left foot or ankle. In a close physical matching, Goss was nearly the same height, and only a few pounds lighter, at around 158 pounds, not considered in the heavyweight division today. Goss, though he had the vitality of a man nearly seven years younger, did not gain from the advantage, as Mace's experience, skill, and conditioning seemed to count for more than the wear he'd received from his years in the ring by age 35. Mace deftly avoided Goss's strong rushes with a shift of his shoulders or a bob of his head, showing great flexibility and speed. In the third round, Mace tripped Goss by extending his left foot behind Goss and pushing him down. Mace could strike or counter quickly, particularly using his left, and often did so under Goss's defenses, even in the early rounds where he scored early and with precision. Mace, in the 14th through 20th rounds, got the better of Goss, frequently striking his left eye with his right fist. At the end of the match in the 21st round, Mace remained strong, but Goss was groggy and weak. Mace was said to have very few injuries, but Goss had been battered around the "head, face, neck, and chest", with loosened teeth and badly battered eyes. In the final round, Goss's seconds threw up the sponge ending the fight when their boxer staggered in his attempt to land a blow on Mace, who defended himself by merely stepping aside.

=== Middleweight defence ===
After several earlier fights were stopped by Police, Tom Allen and Joe Goss finally met on 5 March 1867 in Bristol for what a few historians considered a defense of the Middleweight championship of England. With Police still pursuing the combatants, the fight was relocated twice before commencing at last in Bristol. Goss had just completed a year in jail for his previous fight with Jem Mace. According to one account, Goss had a decided lead until the 34th round. Goss's right and Allen's left hands were somewhat disabled in the fighting, which caused the judges to end the fight in the 35th round in a draw. Like Jem Mace, Goss would soon flee to America where boxing was still popular, and somewhat less hounded by the Police, at least during exhibitions, where he would secure his income for the next few years.

==== In America ====
Goss was in America by July 1867, and remained there fighting primarily exhibitions through 1882, except for a brief trip back to London in January 1876.

Goss returned to America on 15 April 1876, accompanied by Jem Mace, and spent the Spring and Summer travelling the country with the circus. He sparred much of the time from 1877 to 1878 with the well-known wrestler, "Professor" William Miller, and the boxer Johnny Dwyer. He was already 38 years of age, and had been brought over by Jem Mace under contract to the Howe and Cushing circus. Though he had not entered the competitive prize ring in nearly eight years, he hoped to eventually meet Tom Allen again and defeat him in a heavyweight championship contest.

== Heavyweight champion of America, 1876 ==
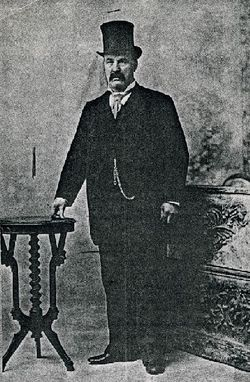
Allen in later life, circa 1897

On 7 September 1876, Goss took the bare-knuckle heavyweight championship of America from Tom Allen in a total of 21 rounds in Boone County, Kentucky, taking one hour and fourteen minutes. Seven rounds were fought in the first location with fourteen additional rounds fought in the second. When authorities intervened in Kenton County, the bout was ruled a draw and moved to Boone County. Each side collected $2,500, an impressive sum, but not surprising as many boxing historians today consider the match for a world and not just an American title. According to one source, a foul caused when Allen struck Goss in the face when he was down in the 21st and last round, turned the decision in favor of Goss. Some dispute occurred as to whether the blow was deliberate. Several newspaper accounts seemed to agree with Allen that he had the better of the fight and was winning when the foul occurred. Allen claimed to have won the bout, and stated "It seems to me that I cannot get fair play in this country, and I now say I will never again enter the ring". Allen was arrested briefly after the match, as boxing was illegal in Kentucky. Goss was later arrested on 16 September in New York and served four months in jail in Burlington, Kentucky. According to one account, Allen skipped bail to head to England to seek fights, and spend time at the racetracks.

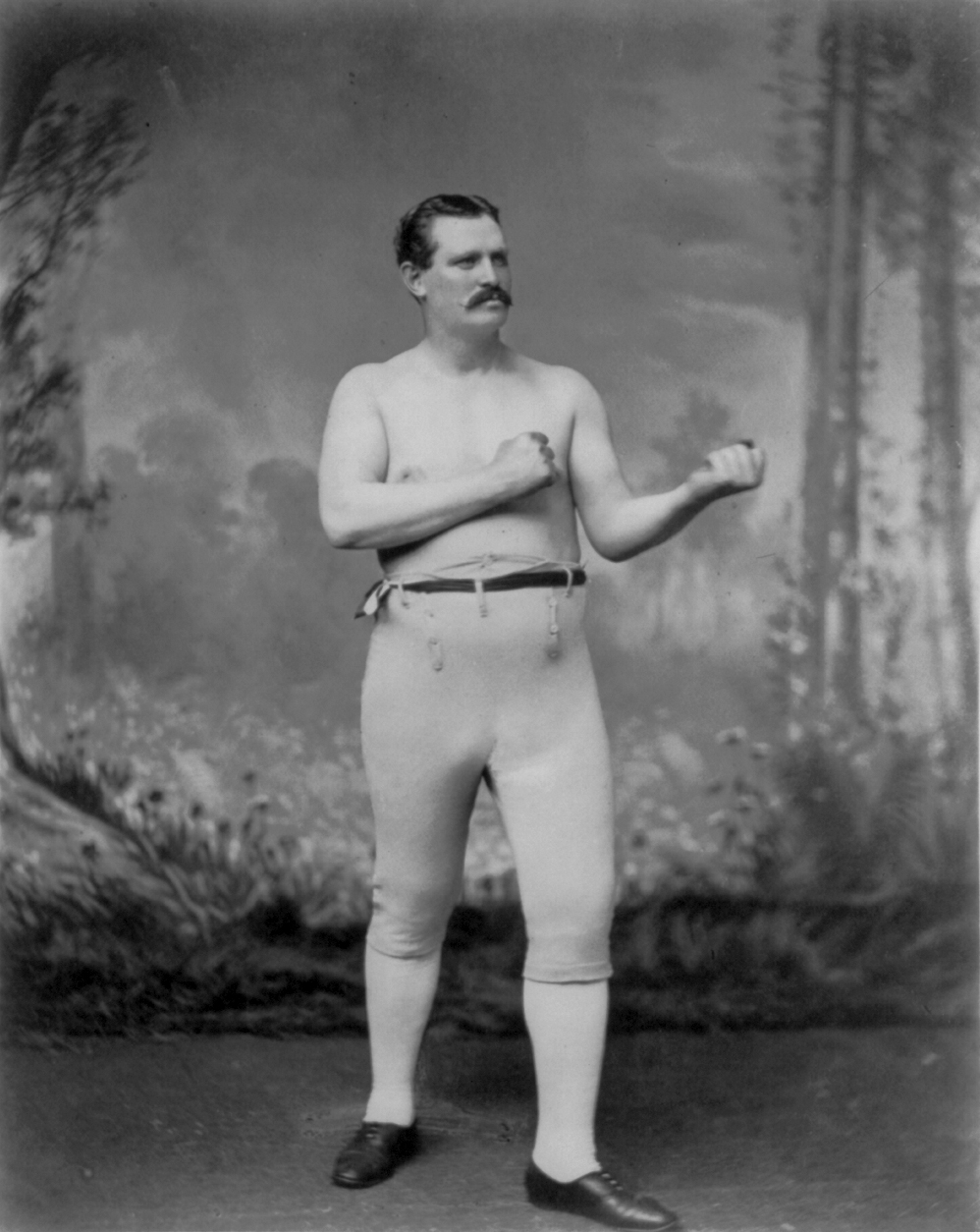
Paddy Ryan

== Losing American championship ==
In the most significant defeat of his career, Goss lost the bare-knuckle heavyweight championship to Paddy Ryan on 30 May 1880 in Collier's Station, West Virginia. The bout was certainly not Ryan's first prize fight, but it may have been his first with bare knuckles. Goss at nearly forty-two was overwhelmed by his youthful twenty-nine year old opponent. In the 87th round, Goss was unable to continue the championship contest and it was stopped after ninety minutes. In the final round, Ryan knocked out Goss with a well placed right. Up until that time the fight was tight and well contested. Goss's seconds claimed a foul in the 87th, and with him being unable to continue, the judges awarded the bout to Ryan after one hour and twenty-seven minutes, a very lengthy contest. Goss appeared winded, but Ryan was terribly battered around the face and body. Goss had as much as a twenty-pound weight disadvantage and nearly a six-inch disadvantage in height, a discrepancy which would have never been allowed in today's boxing, and may have made the difference in the match. It had earlier been made clear to the combatants by the Mayor of nearby Pittsburgh that the illegal fight would not take place in his city.

Goss had grown up and apprenticed as a cobbler in Wolverhampton, Buckinghamshire as a boy. By 1873, an Inn on Wolverhampton's King Street, known as the "Saracen's Head", he had once kept in Woverhampton, Buckinghamshire, near Birmingham, and Northeast of London was liquidated. A Saracen was a reference to an Arab or Muslim, and the emblem of a Saracen's Head usually indicated a person had been on the crusades. It was a name given to several Medieval buildings in Northampton and a large number of subsequent English Pubs and hotels.

Goss engaged in a series of exhibition bouts in America with John L. Sullivan before retiring in 1882 and was in Sullivan's corner when Sullivan won the title from Paddy Ryan.

After he had coached and seconded John L. Sullivan in 1882, he opened his own "Saracen's Head", a Boston Sporting House and tavern at 22 Lagrange Street. On 24 March 1885, Goss died of Bright's disease, not uncommon to boxers, at his clubhouse, Saracen's Head in Boston, at the age of 47. At his side were his wife, his old bartender, and a few relatives and friends. He had been in a state of coma for several days.

In 2003, Goss was admitted to the International Boxing Hall of Fame in the Pioneer category.

== Selected fights ==
6 Wins, 3 Losses, 2 draws
Result	Opponent(s)	Date	Location	Duration	Notes
Win	George Ayers	1857	Brompton Brushes	1 hr. 20mins	
Win	Jack Rooke	20 September 1859	Leaseford, England	64 rounds, 1 hour, 40 minutes	Fought for £25 a side
Win	Bodger Crutchley	17 July 1860	Oxford, England	120 rounds	
Win	John "Posh" Price	25 November 1862	Stonebridge, England	66 rounds	Won English Middleweight Championship; Fought at 69 kg (152 pounds)
Loss	Jem Mace	1 September 1863	London, England	19 rounds	For English Middleweight Championship
Win	Ike Baker	16 December 1863	London, England	27 rounds	
Draw	Jem Mace	24 May 1866	Near Meopham, Kent, England	1 Round	For English Heavyweight Championship
Loss	Jem Mace	6 August 1866	London, England	21 Round	For English Heavyweight Championship
Draw	Tom Allen	5 May 1867	Bristol, England	34 Rounds	
Win	Tom Allen	7 September 1876	Kenton and Boone Counties, Kentucky	21 Rounds, ended in Foul	Won American (World) Heavyweight Championship
Loss	Paddy Ryan	30 May 1880	Collier's Station, West Virginia	87 Rounds	Lost American (World) Heavyweight Championship

Awards and achievements
Preceded by Tom Allen	World Heavyweight Bare-knuckle Boxing Champion; 7 September 1876 – 7 September 1880	Succeeded by Paddy Ryan
