= Marquess of Queensberry Rules =

Vintage rules system for boxing

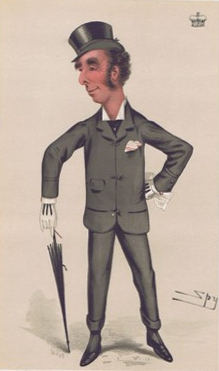
1877 caricature of The 9th Marquess of Queensberry in the London magazine Vanity Fair. The caption by Leslie Ward reads "A good light weight".

The Marquess of Queensberry Rules (also known as the Marquis of Queensbury rules or Queensberry Rules) are a set of generally accepted rules governing the sport of boxing. Drafted by Welsh sportsman John Graham Chambers in London in 1865 and published in 1867, the code was so named due to its public endorsement by John Douglas, 9th Marquess of Queensberry. They were the first to require the use of gloves in boxing. Other new innovations included each round consisting of three minutes of fighting followed by a minute of rest, and any fighter who went down had to get up unaided within 10 seconds; if he could not, he was declared knocked out.

The Queensberry Rules, which eventually superseded the London Prize Ring Rules (revised in 1853), are intended for use in both professional and amateur boxing matches, unlike the less-popular American Fair Play Rules, which were strictly intended for amateur matches. In colloquial use, the term is sometimes used to refer to a sense of sportsmanship and fair play.

== History ==
The boxing code was written by John Graham Chambers, a Welshman from Llanelli, Carmarthenshire, and drafted in London in 1865, before being published in 1867 as "the Queensberry rules for the sport of boxing". At the time, boxing matches were conducted under the London Prize Ring Rules, written in 1838 and revised in 1853. Bare-knuckle fights under the London Prize Rules continued for the next several decades, although the Queensberry Rules would eventually become the standard set of rules under which all boxing matches were governed. This version persuaded boxers that "you must not fight simply to win; no holds barred is not the way; you must win by the rules".

One early prize fighter who fought under Marquess of Queensberry rules was Jem Mace, former English heavyweight champion, who defeated Bill Davis in Virginia City, Nevada, under these rules in 1876, with Mace's enthusiasm for gloved fighting doing much to popularise the Queensberry rules.

In addition to professional boxing, amateur boxing adopted the Queensberry rules. In 1880, the Amateur Boxing Association (ABA), the sport's first amateur governing body, was formed in Britain, and in the following year the ABA staged its first official amateur championships. The Amateur Athletic Union (AAU) of the US was formed in 1888 and instituted its annual championships in boxing the same year.

== Rules ==
The following is the text of the rules.

1. To be a fair stand-up boxing match in a 24-foot ring, or as near that size as practicable.
2. No wrestling allowed.
3. The rounds to be of three minutes' duration, and one minute's time between rounds.
4. If either man falls through weakness or otherwise, he must get up unassisted, the boxer has 10 seconds to allow him to do so, the other man meanwhile to return to his corner, and when the fallen man is on his legs the round is to be resumed and continued until the three minutes have expired. If one man fails to come to the scratch in the 10 count allowed, it shall be in the power of the referee to give his award in favour of the other man.
5. A man hanging on the ropes in a helpless state, with his toes off the ground, shall be considered down.
6. No seconds or any other person to be allowed in the ring during the rounds.
7. Should the contest be stopped by any unavoidable interference, the referee [is] to name the time and place as soon as possible for finishing the contest; so that the match must be won and lost, unless the backers of both men agree to draw the stakes.
8. The gloves to be fair-sized boxing gloves of the best quality and new.
9. Should a glove burst, or come off, it must be replaced to the referee's satisfaction.
10. A man on one knee is considered down and if struck is entitled to the stakes.
11. That no shoes or boots with spikes or sprigs (wire nails) be allowed.
12. The contest in all other respects to be governed by revised London Prize Ring Rules.

== See also ==
- 10 Point System
- London Prize Ring Rules
- Bare-knuckle boxing
